= Communauté de communes Lisieux Pays d'Auge =

Former communauté de communes in Calvados départment, France

The Communauté de communes Lisieux Pays d'Auge is a former communauté de communes located in the Calvados département of northwestern France. It was created in January 2003. It was merged into the Lintercom Lisieux - Pays d'Auge - Normandie in January 2013, which was merged into the new Communauté d'agglomération Lisieux Normandie in January 2017. In 2004, it had a population of 36,085 inhabitants.

The Communauté de communes comprised the following communes:

- Beuvillers
- La Boissière
- Coquainvilliers
- Courtonne-la-Meurdrac
- Courtonne-les-Deux-Églises
- Glos
- Hermival-les-Vaux
- La Houblonnière
- Lessard-et-le-Chêne
- Lisieux
- Le Mesnil-Eudes
- Le Mesnil-Guillaume
- Le Mesnil-Simon
- Les Monceaux
- Ouilly-le-Vicomte
- Le Pré-d'Auge
- Prêtreville
- Rocques
- Saint-Désir
- Saint-Germain-de-Livet
- Saint-Jean-de-Livet
- Saint-Martin-de-la-Lieue
- Saint-Martin-de-Mailloc
- Saint-Pierre-des-Ifs
