= Arrondissement of Lisieux =

Coordinates: 49°08′41″N 0°13′31″E

Lisieux
- Arrondissement
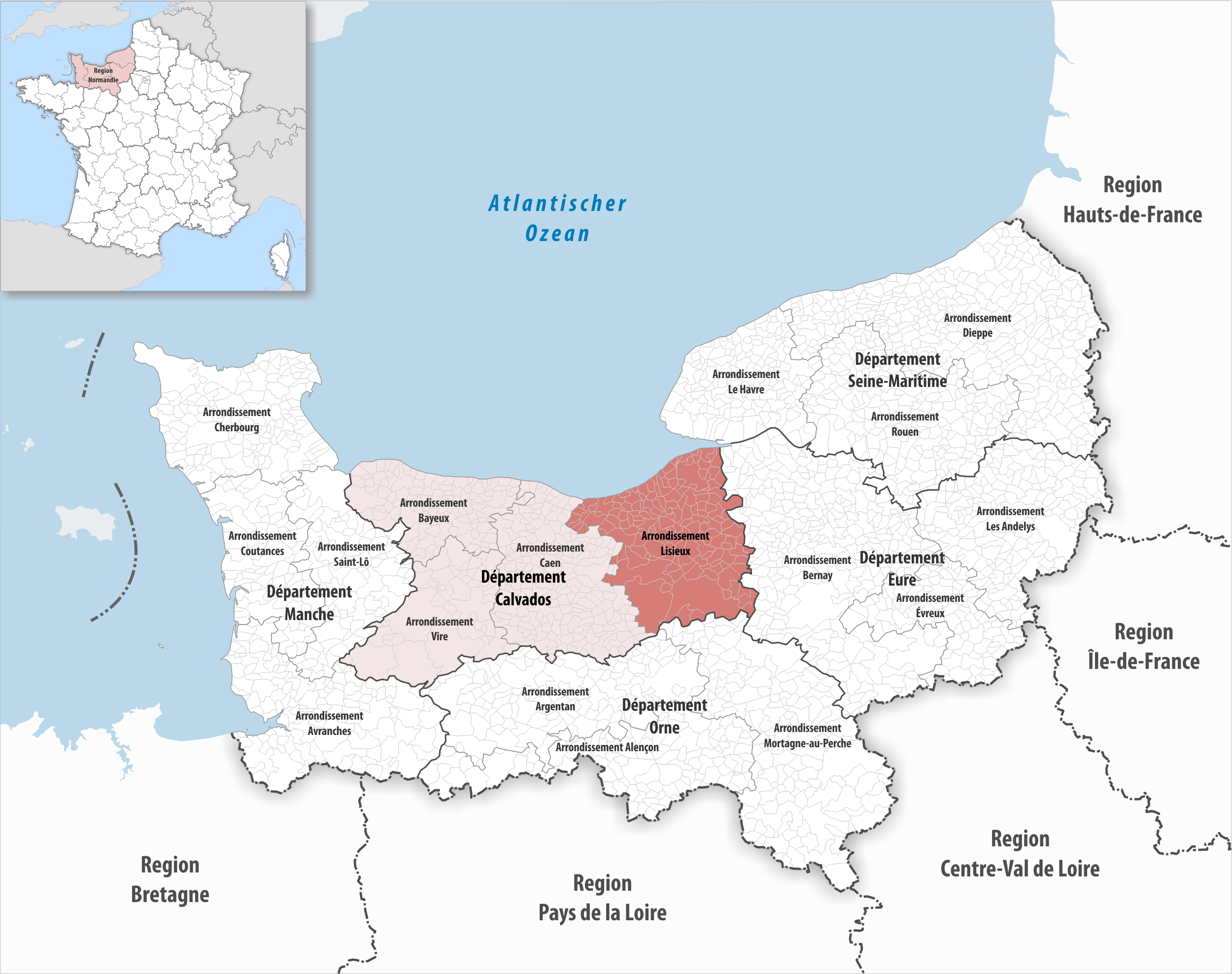
- Location within the region Normandy
- Country: France
- Region: Normandy
- Department: Calvados
- No. of communes: {{{nbcomm}}}
- Area: 1,756.2 km^{2} (678.1 sq mi)
- Population (2023): 160,503
  - Density: 91.392/km^{2} (236.70/sq mi)
- INSEE code: 143

The arrondissement of Lisieux is an arrondissement of France in the Calvados department in the Normandy region. It has 159 communes. Its population is 159,921 (2021), and its area is 1,756.2 km^{2} (678.1 sq mi).

== Composition ==
The communes of the arrondissement of Lisieux are:

1. Ablon (14001)
2. Amfreville (14009)
3. Angerville (14012)
4. Annebault (14016)
5. Auberville (14024)
6. Les Authieux-sur-Calonne (14032)
7. Auvillars (14033)
8. Barneville-la-Bertran (14041)
9. Basseneville (14045)
10. Bavent (14046)
11. Beaufour-Druval (14231)
12. Beaumont-en-Auge (14055)
13. Belle Vie en Auge (14527)
14. Benerville-sur-Mer (14059)
15. Beuvillers (14069)
16. Beuvron-en-Auge (14070)
17. Blangy-le-Château (14077)
18. Blonville-sur-Mer (14079)
19. La Boissière (14082)
20. Bonnebosq (14083)
21. Bonneville-la-Louvet (14085)
22. Bonneville-sur-Touques (14086)
23. Bourgeauville (14091)
24. Branville (14093)
25. Le Breuil-en-Auge (14102)
26. Le Brévedent (14104)
27. Bréville-les-Monts (14106)
28. Brucourt (14110)
29. Cabourg (14117)
30. Cambremer (14126)
31. Canapville (14131)
32. Castillon-en-Auge (14141)
33. Cernay (14147)
34. Clarbec (14161)
35. Coquainvilliers (14177)
36. Cordebugle (14179)
37. Courtonne-la-Meurdrac (14193)
38. Courtonne-les-Deux-Églises (14194)
39. Cresseveuille (14198)
40. Cricquebœuf (14202)
41. Cricqueville-en-Auge (14203)
42. Danestal (14218)
43. Deauville (14220)
44. Dives-sur-Mer (14225)
45. Douville-en-Auge (14227)
46. Dozulé (14229)
47. Drubec (14230)
48. Englesqueville-en-Auge (14238)
49. Équemauville (14243)
50. Escoville (14246)
51. Fauguernon (14260)
52. Le Faulq (14261)
53. Fierville-les-Parcs (14269)
54. Firfol (14270)
55. La Folletière-Abenon (14273)
56. Formentin (14280)
57. Le Fournet (14285)
58. Fourneville (14286)
59. Fumichon (14293)
60. Genneville (14299)
61. Glanville (14302)
62. Glos (14303)
63. Gonneville-en-Auge (14306)
64. Gonneville-sur-Honfleur (14304)
65. Gonneville-sur-Mer (14305)
66. Goustranville (14308)
67. Grangues (14316)
68. Hermival-les-Vaux (14326)
69. Hérouvillette (14328)
70. Heuland (14329)
71. Honfleur (14333)
72. L'Hôtellerie (14334)
73. Hotot-en-Auge (14335)
74. La Houblonnière (14337)
75. Houlgate (14338)
76. Léaupartie (14358)
77. Lessard-et-le-Chêne (14362)
78. Lisieux (14366)
79. Lisores (14368)
80. Livarot-Pays-d'Auge (14371)
81. Manerbe (14398)
82. Manneville-la-Pipard (14399)
83. Marolles (14403)
84. Merville-Franceville-Plage (14409)
85. Méry-Bissières-en-Auge (14410)
86. Le Mesnil-Eudes (14419)
87. Le Mesnil-Guillaume (14421)
88. Le Mesnil-Simon (14425)
89. Le Mesnil-sur-Blangy (14426)
90. Mézidon Vallée d'Auge (14431)
91. Les Monceaux (14435)
92. Montreuil-en-Auge (14448)
93. Moyaux (14460)
94. Norolles (14466)
95. Notre-Dame-de-Livaye (14473)
96. Notre-Dame-d'Estrées-Corbon (14474)
97. Orbec (14478)
98. Ouilly-du-Houley (14484)
99. Ouilly-le-Vicomte (14487)
100. Pennedepie (14492)
101. Périers-en-Auge (14494)
102. Petiville (14499)
103. Pierrefitte-en-Auge (14500)
104. Le Pin (14504)
105. Pont-l'Évêque (14514)
106. Le Pré-d'Auge (14520)
107. Prêtreville (14522)
108. Putot-en-Auge (14524)
109. Quetteville (14528)
110. Ranville (14530)
111. Repentigny (14533)
112. Reux (14534)
113. La Rivière-Saint-Sauveur (14536)
114. Rocques (14540)
115. La Roque-Baignard (14541)
116. Rumesnil (14550)
117. Saint-André-d'Hébertot (14555)
118. Saint-Arnoult (14557)
119. Saint-Benoît-d'Hébertot (14563)
120. Saint-Denis-de-Mailloc (14571)
121. Saint-Désir (14574)
122. Saint-Étienne-la-Thillaye (14575)
123. Saint-Gatien-des-Bois (14578)
124. Saint-Germain-de-Livet (14582)
125. Saint-Hymer (14593)
126. Saint-Jean-de-Livet (14595)
127. Saint-Jouin (14598)
128. Saint-Julien-sur-Calonne (14601)
129. Saint-Léger-Dubosq (14606)
130. Saint-Martin-aux-Chartrains (14620)
131. Saint-Martin-de-Bienfaite-la-Cressonnière (14621)
132. Saint-Martin-de-la-Lieue (14625)
133. Saint-Martin-de-Mailloc (14626)
134. Saint-Ouen-le-Pin (14639)
135. Saint-Philbert-des-Champs (14644)
136. Saint-Pierre-Azif (14645)
137. Saint-Pierre-des-Ifs (14648)
138. Saint-Pierre-en-Auge (14654)
139. Saint-Samson (14657)
140. Saint-Vaast-en-Auge (14660)
141. Sallenelles (14665)
142. Surville (14682)
143. Le Theil-en-Auge (14687)
144. Le Torquesne (14694)
145. Touffréville (14698)
146. Touques (14699)
147. Tourgéville (14701)
148. Tourville-en-Auge (14706)
149. Trouville-sur-Mer (14715)
150. Val-de-Vie (14576)
151. Valorbiquet (14570)
152. Valsemé (14723)
153. Varaville (14724)
154. Vauville (14731)
155. La Vespière-Friardel (14740)
156. Victot-en-Auge (14743)
157. Vieux-Bourg (14748)
158. Villers-sur-Mer (14754)
159. Villerville (14755)

== History ==
The arrondissement of Lisieux was created in 1800. At the January 2017 reorganisation of the arrondissements of Calvados, it gained 15 communes from the arrondissement of Caen.

As a result of the reorganisation of the cantons of France which came into effect in 2015, the borders of the cantons are no longer related to the borders of the arrondissements. The cantons of the arrondissement of Lisieux were, as of January 2015:

1. Blangy-le-Château
2. Cambremer
3. Dozulé
4. Honfleur
5. Lisieux 1st Canton
6. Lisieux 2nd Canton
7. Lisieux 3rd Canton
8. Livarot
9. Mézidon-Canon
10. Orbec
11. Pont-l'Évêque
12. Saint-Pierre-sur-Dives
13. Trouville-sur-Mer

== Sub-prefects ==
- Robert Miguet : 1959
