= Communes of the Calvados department =

List of communes of the Calvados department of France

A map of the departments of France with Calvados being highlighted in red.

The following is a list of the 526 communes of the Calvados department of France.

The communes cooperate in the following intercommunalities (as of 2025):

- Communauté urbaine Caen la Mer
- Communauté d'agglomération Lisieux Normandie
- Communauté de communes de Bayeux Intercom
- Communauté de communes Cingal-Suisse Normande
- Communauté de communes Cœur Côte Fleurie
- Communauté de communes Cœur de Nacre
- Communauté de communes Intercom de la Vire au Noireau
- Communauté de communes Isigny-Omaha Intercom
- Communauté de communes Normandie-Cabourg-Pays d'Auge
- Communauté de communes du Pays de Falaise
- Communauté de communes du Pays de Honfleur-Beuzeville (partly)
- Communauté de communes Pré-Bocage Intercom
- Communauté de communes Seulles Terre et Mer
- Communauté de communes Terre d'Auge
- Communauté de communes Val ès Dunes
- Communauté de communes Vallées de l'Orne et de l'Odon

INSEE	Postal	Commune
14001	14600	Ablon
14003	14400	Agy
14006	14210	Amayé-sur-Orne
14007	14310	Amayé-sur-Seulles
14009	14860	Amfreville
14012	14430	Angerville
14015	14610	Anisy
14016	14430	Annebault
14019	14400	Arganchy
14020	14370	Argences
14021	14117	Arromanches-les-Bains
14022	14960	Asnelles
14023	14710	Asnières-en-Bessin
14024	14640	Auberville
14025	14700	Aubigny
14026	14250	Audrieu
14591	14520	Aure sur Mer
14011	14240	Aurseulles
14030	14280	Authie
14032	14130	Les Authieux-sur-Calonne
14033	14340	Auvillars
14034	14210	Avenay
14035	14490	Balleroy-sur-Drôme
14036	14940	Banneville-la-Campagne
14038	14480	Banville
14039	14220	Barbery
14040	14400	Barbeville
14041	14600	Barneville-la-Bertran
14042	14210	Baron-sur-Odon
14043	14620	Barou-en-Auge
14044	14610	Basly
14045	14670	Basseneville
14046	14860	Bavent
14047	14400	Bayeux
14049	14480	Bazenville
14050	14490	La Bazoque
14231	14340	Beaufour-Druval
14053	14620	Beaumais
14054	14380	Beaumesnil
14055	14950	Beaumont-en-Auge
14057	14370	Bellengreville
14527	14270	Belle Vie en Auge
14059	14910	Benerville-sur-Mer
14060	14970	Bénouville
14062	14440	Bény-sur-Mer
14063	14710	Bernesq
14064	14170	Bernières-d'Ailly
14066	14990	Bernières-sur-Mer
14069	14100	Beuvillers
14070	14430	Beuvron-en-Auge
14068	14112	Biéville-Beuville
14076	14550	Blainville-sur-Orne
14077	14130	Blangy-le-Château
14078	14400	Blay
14079	14910	Blonville-sur-Mer
14080	14690	Le Bô
14082	14340	La Boissière
14083	14340	Bonnebosq
14084	14260	Bonnemaison
14085	14130	Bonneville-la-Louvet
14086	14800	Bonneville-sur-Touques
14087	14700	Bonnœil
14088	14420	Bons-Tassilly
14089	14210	Bougy
14090	14220	Boulon
14091	14430	Bourgeauville
14092	14540	Bourguébus
14093	14430	Branville
14096	14260	Brémoy
14097	14190	Bretteville-le-Rabet
14100	14680	Bretteville-sur-Laize
14101	14760	Bretteville-sur-Odon
14102	14130	Le Breuil-en-Auge
14103	14330	Le Breuil-en-Bessin
14104	14130	Le Brévedent
14106	14860	Bréville-les-Monts
14107	14710	Bricqueville
14110	14160	Brucourt
14111	14250	Bucéels
14116	14190	Le Bû-sur-Rouvres
14117	14390	Cabourg
14118	14000	Caen
14119	14630	Cagny
14120	14240	Cahagnes
14121	14490	Cahagnolles
14122	14210	La Caine
14123	14610	Cairon
14124	14230	La Cambe
14125	14610	Cambes-en-Plaine
14126	14340	Cambremer
14127	14500	Campagnolles
14130	14490	Campigny
14131	14800	Canapville
14132	14230	Canchy
14134	14370	Canteloup
14135	14740	Carcagny
14136	14230	Cardonville
14137	14650	Carpiquet
14138	14330	Cartigny-l'Épinay
14554	14540	Le Castelet
14140	14490	Castillon
14141	14140	Castillon-en-Auge
14538	14540	Castine-en-Plaine
14143	14240	Caumont-sur-Aure
14145	14190	Cauvicourt
14146	14770	Cauville
14147	14290	Cernay
14149	14270	Cesny-aux-Vignes
14150	14220	Cesny-les-Sources
14159	14250	Chouain
14160	14680	Cintheaux
14161	14130	Clarbec
14162	14570	Clécy
14163	14370	Cléville
14166	14880	Colleville-Montgomery
14165	14710	Colleville-sur-Mer
14167	14460	Colombelles
14168	14710	Colombières
14169	14480	Colombiers-sur-Seulles
14014	14610	Colomby-Anguerny
14171	14220	Combray
14172	14520	Commes
14174	14110	Condé-en-Normandie
14173	14270	Condé-sur-Ifs
14175	14400	Condé-sur-Seulles
14177	14130	Coquainvilliers
14179	14100	Cordebugle
14180	14700	Cordey
14181	14123	Cormelles-le-Royal
14182	14240	Cormolain
14183	14690	Cossesseville
14184	14400	Cottun
14190	14170	Courcy
14191	14470	Courseulles-sur-Mer
14193	14100	Courtonne-la-Meurdrac
14194	14290	Courtonne-les-Deux-Églises
14195	14260	Courvaudon
14196	14480	Crépon
14197	14440	Cresserons
14198	14430	Cresseveuille
14200	14480	Creully sur Seulles
14202	14113	Cricquebœuf
14203	14430	Cricqueville-en-Auge
14204	14450	Cricqueville-en-Bessin
14205	14250	Cristot
14206	14620	Crocy
14207	14220	Croisilles
14209	14400	Crouay
14211	14220	Culey-le-Patry
14214	14400	Cussy
14215	14840	Cuverville
14216	14620	Damblainville
14218	14430	Danestal
14220	14800	Deauville
14221	14840	Démouville
14223	14690	Le Détroit
14224	14230	Deux-Jumeaux
14347	14260	Dialan sur Chaîne
14225	14160	Dives-sur-Mer
14226	14220	Donnay
14227	14430	Douville-en-Auge
14228	14440	Douvres-la-Délivrande
14229	14430	Dozulé
14230	14130	Drubec
14232	14250	Ducy-Sainte-Marguerite
14236	14250	Ellon
14237	14630	Émiéville
14238	14800	Englesqueville-en-Auge
14239	14710	Englesqueville-la-Percée
14240	14170	Épaney
14241	14310	Épinay-sur-Odon
14242	14610	Épron
14243	14600	Équemauville
14244	14700	Eraines
14245	14270	Ernes
14246	14850	Escoville
14248	14220	Espins
14249	14210	Esquay-Notre-Dame
14250	14400	Esquay-sur-Seulles
14251	14220	Esson
14252	14190	Estrées-la-Campagne
14254	14930	Éterville
14256	14400	Étréham
14257	14210	Évrecy
14258	14700	Falaise
14260	14100	Fauguernon
14261	14130	Le Faulq
14266	14320	Feuguerolles-Bully
14269	14130	Fierville-les-Parcs
14270	14100	Firfol
14271	14123	Fleury-sur-Orne
14272	14710	La Folie
14273	14290	La Folletière-Abenon
14274	14790	Fontaine-Étoupefour
14275	14610	Fontaine-Henry
14276	14190	Fontaine-le-Pin
14277	14320	Fontenay-le-Marmion
14278	14250	Fontenay-le-Pesnel
14280	14340	Formentin
14281	14710	Formigny La Bataille
14282	14240	Foulognes
14283	14620	Fourches
14284	14700	Fourneaux-le-Val
14285	14340	Le Fournet
14286	14600	Fourneville
14287	14630	Frénouville
14288	14480	Le Fresne-Camilly
14289	14700	Fresné-la-Mère
14290	14680	Fresney-le-Puceux
14291	14220	Fresney-le-Vieux
14293	14590	Fumichon
14297	14210	Gavrus
14298	14230	Géfosse-Fontenay
14299	14600	Genneville
14301	14730	Giberville
14302	14950	Glanville
14303	14100	Glos
14306	14810	Gonneville-en-Auge
14304	14600	Gonneville-sur-Honfleur
14305	14510	Gonneville-sur-Mer
14308	14430	Goustranville
14309	14680	Gouvix
14310	14190	Grainville-Langannerie
14311	14210	Grainville-sur-Odon
14312	14450	Grandcamp-Maisy
14316	14160	Grangues
14318	14470	Graye-sur-Mer
14319	14540	Grentheville
14320	14220	Grimbosq
14322	14400	Guéron
14325	14880	Hermanville-sur-Mer
14326	14100	Hermival-les-Vaux
14327	14200	Hérouville-Saint-Clair
14328	14850	Hérouvillette
14329	14430	Heuland
14332	14700	La Hoguette
14333	14600	Honfleur
14334	14100	L'Hôtellerie
14335	14430	Hotot-en-Auge
14336	14250	Hottot-les-Bagues
14337	14340	La Houblonnière
14338	14510	Houlgate
14341	14123	Ifs
14342	14230	Isigny-sur-Mer
14343	14690	Les Isles-Bardel
14344	14670	Janville
14345	14170	Jort
14346	14250	Juaye-Mondaye
14348	14250	Juvigny-sur-Seulles
14349	14320	Laize-Clinchamps
14352	14380	Landelles-et-Coupigny
14353	14310	Landes-sur-Ajon
14354	14830	Langrune-sur-Mer
14358	14340	Léaupartie
14360	14700	Leffard
14362	14140	Lessard-et-le-Chêne
14364	14250	Lingèvres
14365	14780	Lion-sur-Mer
14366	14100	Lisieux
14367	14330	Lison
14368	14140	Lisores
14369	14490	Litteau
14371	14140	Livarot-Pays-d'Auge
14374	14240	Les Loges
14375	14700	Les Loges-Saulces
14377	14400	Longues-sur-Mer
14378	14230	Longueville
14379	14310	Longvillers
14380	14250	Loucelles
14381	14170	Louvagny

INSEE	Postal	Commune
14383	14111	Louvigny
14384	14530	Luc-sur-Mer
14385	14400	Magny-en-Bessin
14389	14310	Maisoncelles-Pelvey
14390	14210	Maisoncelles-sur-Ajon
14391	14400	Maisons
14393	14210	Maizet
14394	14190	Maizières
14037	14260	Malherbe-sur-Ajon
14396	14930	Maltot
14397	14710	Mandeville-en-Bessin
14398	14340	Manerbe
14399	14130	Manneville-la-Pipard
14400	14400	Le Manoir
14401	14117	Manvieux
14402	14620	Le Marais-la-Chapelle
14403	14100	Marolles
14404	14220	Martainville
14405	14700	Martigny-sur-l'Ante
14407	14920	Mathieu
14409	14810	Merville-Franceville-Plage
14410	14370	Méry-Bissières-en-Auge
14411	14220	Meslay
14412	14260	Le Mesnil-au-Grain
14419	14100	Le Mesnil-Eudes
14421	14100	Le Mesnil-Guillaume
14424	14380	Le Mesnil-Robert
14425	14140	Le Mesnil-Simon
14426	14130	Le Mesnil-sur-Blangy
14427	14690	Le Mesnil-Villement
14430	14960	Meuvaines
14431	14270	Mézidon Vallée d'Auge
14370	14330	Le Molay-Littry
14435	14100	Les Monceaux
14436	14400	Monceaux-en-Bessin
14437	14120	Mondeville
14438	14210	Mondrainville
14439	14230	Monfréville
14445	14490	Montfiquet
14446	14210	Montigny
14713	14210	Montillières-sur-Orne
14448	14340	Montreuil-en-Auge
14027	14260	Les Monts d'Aunay
14449	14310	Monts-en-Bessin
14452	14620	Morteaux-Coulibœuf
14453	14400	Mosles
14454	14790	Mouen
14455	14220	Moulines
14406	14740	Moulins en Bessin
14456	14370	Moult-Chicheboville
14457	14620	Les Moutiers-en-Auge
14458	14220	Les Moutiers-en-Cinglais
14460	14590	Moyaux
14461	14220	Mutrécy
14465	14400	Nonant
14466	14100	Norolles
14467	14700	Noron-l'Abbaye
14468	14490	Noron-la-Poterie
14469	14620	Norrey-en-Auge
14473	14340	Notre-Dame-de-Livaye
14474	14340	Notre-Dame-d'Estrées-Corbon
14658	14380	Noues de Sienne
14476	14170	Olendon
14478	14290	Orbec
14480	14230	Osmanville
14482	14270	Ouézy
14483	14220	Ouffières
14484	14590	Ouilly-du-Houley
14486	14190	Ouilly-le-Tesson
14487	14100	Ouilly-le-Vicomte
14488	14150	Ouistreham
14491	14310	Parfouru-sur-Odon
14492	14600	Pennedepie
14494	14160	Périers-en-Auge
14495	14112	Périers-sur-le-Dan
14496	14770	Périgny
14497	14170	Perrières
14498	14700	Pertheville-Ners
14499	14390	Petiville
14500	14130	Pierrefitte-en-Auge
14501	14690	Pierrefitte-en-Cinglais
14502	14690	Pierrepont
14504	14590	Le Pin
14506	14490	Planquery
14509	14440	Plumetot
14510	14690	La Pommeraye
14511	14380	Pont-Bellanger
14764	14690	Pont-d'Ouilly
14512	14110	Pontécoulant
14514	14130	Pont-l'Évêque
14515	14520	Port-en-Bessin-Huppain
14355	14480	Ponts sur Seulles
14516	14420	Potigny
14519	14210	Préaux-Bocage
14520	14340	Le Pré-d'Auge
14522	14140	Prêtreville
14524	14430	Putot-en-Auge
14528	14130	Quetteville
14529	14400	Ranchy
14530	14860	Ranville
14531	14690	Rapilly
14533	14340	Repentigny
14534	14130	Reux
14535	14470	Reviers
14536	14600	La Rivière-Saint-Sauveur
14540	14100	Rocques
14541	14340	La Roque-Baignard
14542	14740	Rosel
14543	14980	Rots
14546	14190	Rouvres
14547	14710	Rubercy
14550	14340	Rumesnil
14552	14400	Ryes
14555	14130	Saint-André-d'Hébertot
14556	14320	Saint-André-sur-Orne
14557	14800	Saint-Arnoult
14558	14970	Saint-Aubin-d'Arquenay
14559	14380	Saint-Aubin-des-Bois
14562	14750	Saint-Aubin-sur-Mer
14563	14130	Saint-Benoît-d'Hébertot
14565	14960	Saint-Côme-de-Fresné
14566	14280	Saint-Contest
14571	14100	Saint-Denis-de-Mailloc
14572	14110	Saint-Denis-de-Méré
14574	14100	Saint-Désir
14569	14480	Sainte-Croix-sur-Mer
14590	14240	Sainte-Honorine-de-Ducy
14592	14210	Sainte-Honorine-du-Fay
14614	14330	Sainte-Marguerite-d'Elle
14619	14380	Sainte-Marie-Outre-l'Eau
14575	14950	Saint-Étienne-la-Thillaye
14578	14130	Saint-Gatien-des-Bois
14582	14100	Saint-Germain-de-Livet
14586	14230	Saint-Germain-du-Pert
14587	14280	Saint-Germain-la-Blanche-Herbe
14588	14700	Saint-Germain-Langot
14589	14190	Saint-Germain-le-Vasson
14593	14130	Saint-Hymer
14595	14100	Saint-Jean-de-Livet
14598	14430	Saint-Jouin
14601	14130	Saint-Julien-sur-Calonne
14602	14570	Saint-Lambert
14603	14220	Saint-Laurent-de-Condel
14605	14710	Saint-Laurent-sur-Mer
14606	14430	Saint-Léger-Dubosq
14607	14310	Saint-Louet-sur-Seulles
14609	14400	Saint-Loup-Hors
14610	14740	Saint-Manvieu-Norrey
14613	14330	Saint-Marcouf
14620	14130	Saint-Martin-aux-Chartrains
14621	14290	Saint-Martin-de-Bienfaite-la-Cressonnière
14622	14710	Saint-Martin-de-Blagny
14625	14100	Saint-Martin-de-la-Lieue
14626	14100	Saint-Martin-de-Mailloc
14408	14320	Saint-Martin-de-May
14627	14700	Saint-Martin-de-Mieux
14630	14400	Saint-Martin-des-Entrées
14635	14220	Saint-Omer
14637	14670	Saint-Ouen-du-Mesnil-Oger
14639	14340	Saint-Ouen-le-Pin
14640	14670	Saint-Pair
14643	14490	Saint-Paul-du-Vernay
14644	14130	Saint-Philbert-des-Champs
14645	14950	Saint-Pierre-Azif
14646	14700	Saint-Pierre-Canivet
14648	14100	Saint-Pierre-des-Ifs
14649	14700	Saint-Pierre-du-Bû
14650	14260	Saint-Pierre-du-Fresne
14651	14670	Saint-Pierre-du-Jonquet
14652	14450	Saint-Pierre-du-Mont
14654	14170	Saint-Pierre-en-Auge
14656	14570	Saint-Rémy
14657	14670	Saint-Samson
14659	14190	Saint-Sylvain
14660	14640	Saint-Vaast-en-Auge
14661	14250	Saint-Vaast-sur-Seulles
14663	14400	Saint-Vigor-le-Grand
14664	14240	Sallen
14665	14121	Sallenelles
14666	14940	Sannerville
14667	14330	Saon
14668	14330	Saonnet
14669	14170	Sassy
14579	14260	Seulline
14674	14190	Soignolles
14675	14540	Soliers
14676	14400	Sommervieu
14677	14700	Soulangy
14061	14350	Souleuvre en Bocage
14678	14420	Soumont-Saint-Quentin
14679	14400	Subles
14680	14400	Sully
14681	14710	Surrain
14682	14130	Surville
14357	14770	Terres de Druance
14684	14250	Tessel
14685	14610	Thaon
14687	14130	Le Theil-en-Auge
14098	14740	Thue et Mue
14689	14220	Thury-Harcourt-le-Hom
14692	14250	Tilly-sur-Seulles
14694	14130	Le Torquesne
14698	14940	Touffréville
14699	14800	Touques
14700	14400	Tour-en-Bessin
14701	14800	Tourgéville
14705	14330	Tournières
14706	14130	Tourville-en-Auge
14707	14210	Tourville-sur-Odon
14708	14310	Tracy-Bocage
14709	14117	Tracy-sur-Mer
14710	14690	Tréprel
14711	14710	Trévières
14712	14670	Troarn
14714	14490	Le Tronquay
14715	14360	Trouville-sur-Mer
14716	14490	Trungy
14719	14190	Urville
14720	14420	Ussy
14721	14210	Vacognes-Neuilly
14005	14370	Valambray
14726	14410	Valdallière
14475	14210	Val d'Arry
14672	14240	Val de Drôme
14576	14140	Val-de-Vie
14570	14290	Valorbiquet
14723	14340	Valsemé
14724	14390	Varaville
14728	14400	Vaucelles
14731	14800	Vauville
14732	14400	Vaux-sur-Aure
14733	14400	Vaux-sur-Seulles
14734	14250	Vendes
14735	14170	Vendeuvre
14737	14700	Versainville
14738	14790	Verson
14739	14114	Ver-sur-Mer
14740	14290	La Vespière-Friardel
14741	14570	Le Vey
14742	14170	Vicques
14743	14430	Victot-en-Auge
14744	14400	Vienne-en-Bessin
14745	14710	Vierville-sur-Mer
14747	14930	Vieux
14748	14130	Vieux-Bourg
14751	14700	Vignats
14752	14310	Villers-Bocage
14753	14420	Villers-Canivet
14754	14640	Villers-sur-Mer
14755	14113	Villerville
14756	14570	La Villette
14758	14610	Villons-les-Buissons
14760	14310	Villy-Bocage
14759	14700	Villy-lez-Falaise
14761	14370	Vimont
14762	14500	Vire Normandie
