= Saint-Martin-de-Bienfaite-la-Cressonnière =

- Commune
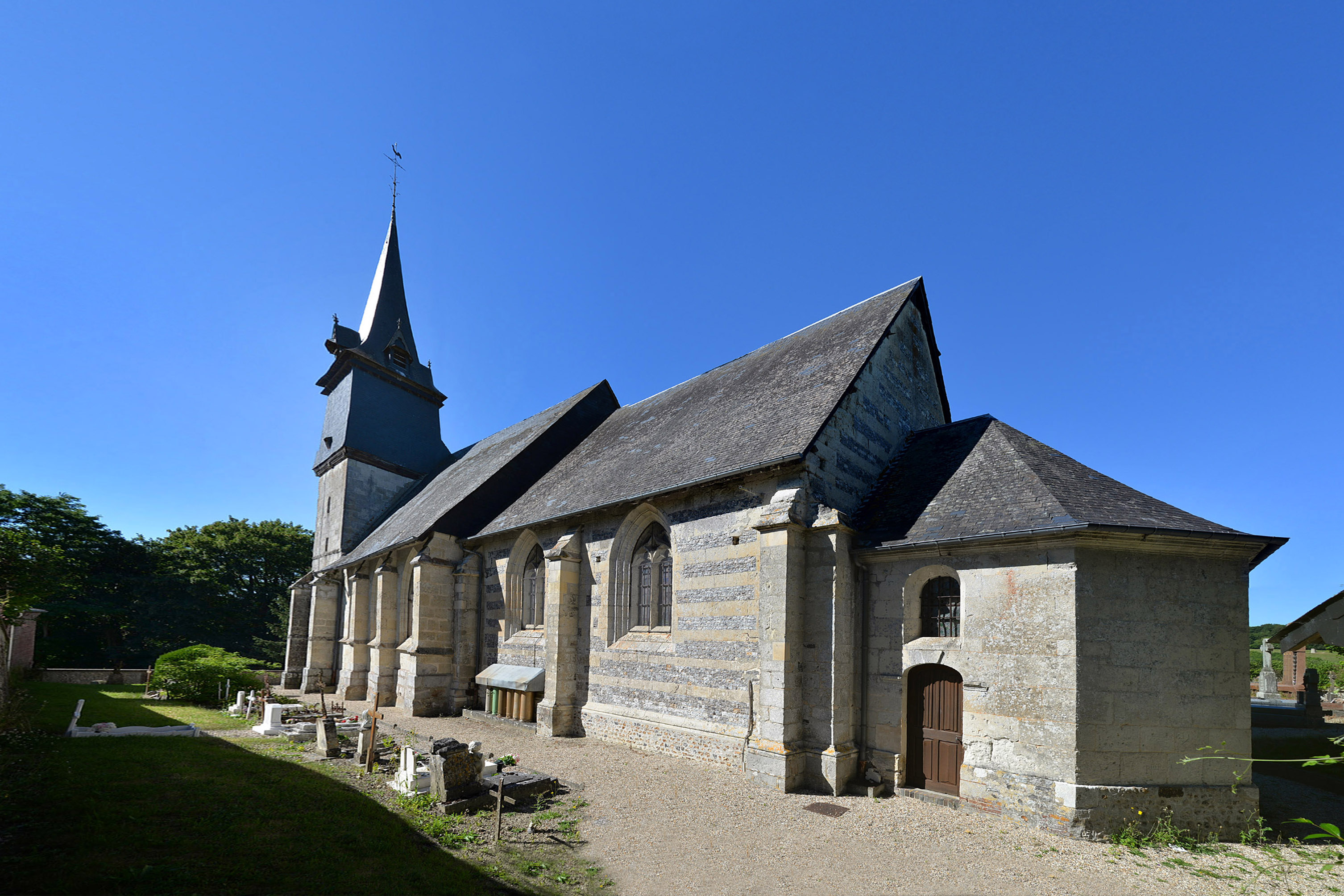
- The church in Saint-Martin-de-Bienfaite-la-Cressonnière

- Coat of arms
- Location of Saint-Martin-de-Bienfaite-la-Cressonnière
- Location within France Location within Normandy
- Coordinates: 49°02′46″N 0°21′47″E
- Country: France
- Region: Normandy
- Department: Calvados
- Arrondissement: Lisieux
- Canton: Livarot-Pays-d'Auge
- Intercommunality: CA Lisieux Normandie

Government
  - Mayor (2020–2026): Christian de Meneval
- Area^{1}: 11.55 km^{2} (4.46 sq mi)
- Elevation: 100 m (330 ft)
- Highest elevation: 190 m (620 ft)
- Lowest elevation: 80 m (260 ft)
- Population (2023): 536
  - Density: 46.4/km^{2} (120/sq mi)
- Time zone: UTC+01:00 (CET)
  - Summer (DST): UTC+02:00 (CEST)
- INSEE/Postal code: 14621 /14290
- ^{1} French Land Register data, which excludes lakes, ponds, glaciers > 1 km^{2} (0.386 sq mi or 247 acres) and river estuaries.

Saint-Martin-de-Bienfaite-la-Cressonnière is a commune in the Calvados department in the Normandy region in northwestern France. Its manor was given to Richard fitz Gilbert, one of the Norman conquerors of England, who was in eventual castle-endowed places given Clare, Suffolk and Tonbridge, Kent; he and his contemporaries varied among using Bienfaite, Clare and Tonbridge as suffixes to his name.

Composed of little housing/gardens, and predominantly agricultural land, the commune however adjoins Orbec which has its town centre further to the south-east. About five times the distance to the north-west is the large, mainly urban commune of Lisieux, one of five spoke hub towns of the department economically; Calvados is centred on the city of Caen. All three local places straddle a river that rises in Normandy (L'Orbiquet), with Lisieux having the confluence of another which happens to take up the main name downstream of that point, the Touques, though due to elevation, weirs, depth and meanders, not navigable to weighty vessels from the Baie de la Seine.

== Population ==
Historical population
Year	Pop.	±% p.a.
1968	514	—
1975	518	+0.11%
1982	594	+1.98%
1990	477	−2.70%
1999	443	−0.82%
2007	479	+0.98%
2012	536	+2.27%
2017	452	−3.35%
2023	536	+2.88%
Source: INSEE

== See also ==
- Communes of the Calvados department
