= La Folletière-Abenon =

- Commune
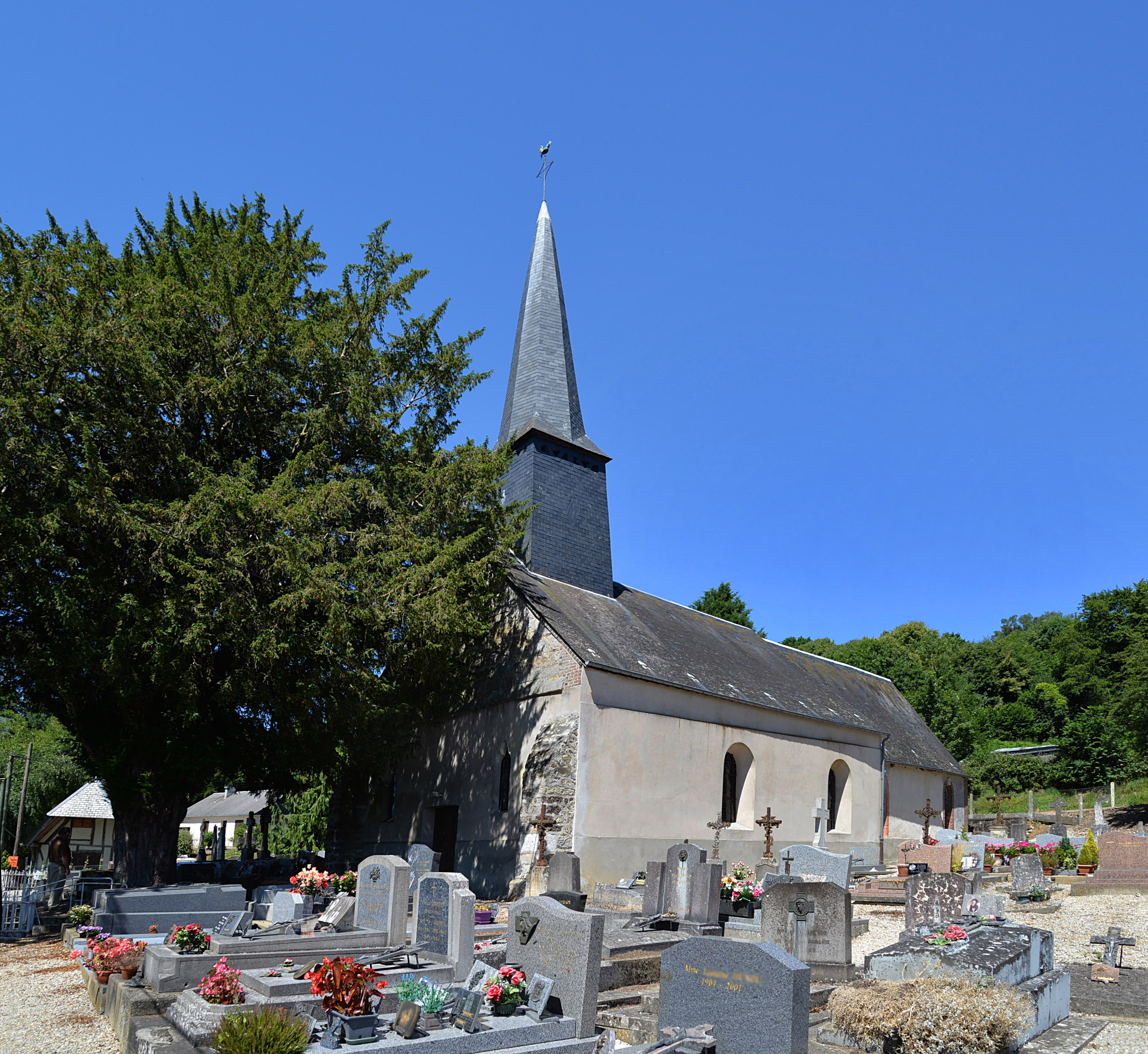
- The church in La Folletière-Abenon
- Location of La Folletière-Abenon
- Location within France Location within Normandy
- Coordinates: 48°58′59″N 0°25′29″E
- Country: France
- Region: Normandy
- Department: Calvados
- Arrondissement: Lisieux
- Canton: Livarot-Pays-d'Auge
- Intercommunality: CA Lisieux Normandie

Government
  - Mayor (2020–2026): Roger Lepage
- Area^{1}: 10.75 km^{2} (4.15 sq mi)
- Elevation: 260 m (850 ft)
- Highest elevation: 207 m (679 ft)
- Lowest elevation: 122 m (400 ft)
- Population (2023): 138
  - Density: 12.8/km^{2} (33.2/sq mi)
- Time zone: UTC+01:00 (CET)
  - Summer (DST): UTC+02:00 (CEST)
- INSEE/Postal code: 14273 /14290
- ^{1} French Land Register data, which excludes lakes, ponds, glaciers > 1 km^{2} (0.386 sq mi or 247 acres) and river estuaries.

La Folletière-Abenon (French pronunciation: [la fɔltjɛʁ abnɔ̃]) is a commune in the Calvados department in the Normandy region in northwestern France.

== Population ==
Historical population
Year	Pop.	±% p.a.
1968	150	—
1975	138	−1.18%
1982	105	−3.83%
1990	135	+3.19%
1999	135	+0.00%
2007	154	+1.66%
2012	149	−0.66%
2017	129	−2.84%
2023	138	+1.13%
Source: INSEE

== See also ==
- Communes of the Calvados department
