= Montreuil-en-Auge =

- Commune
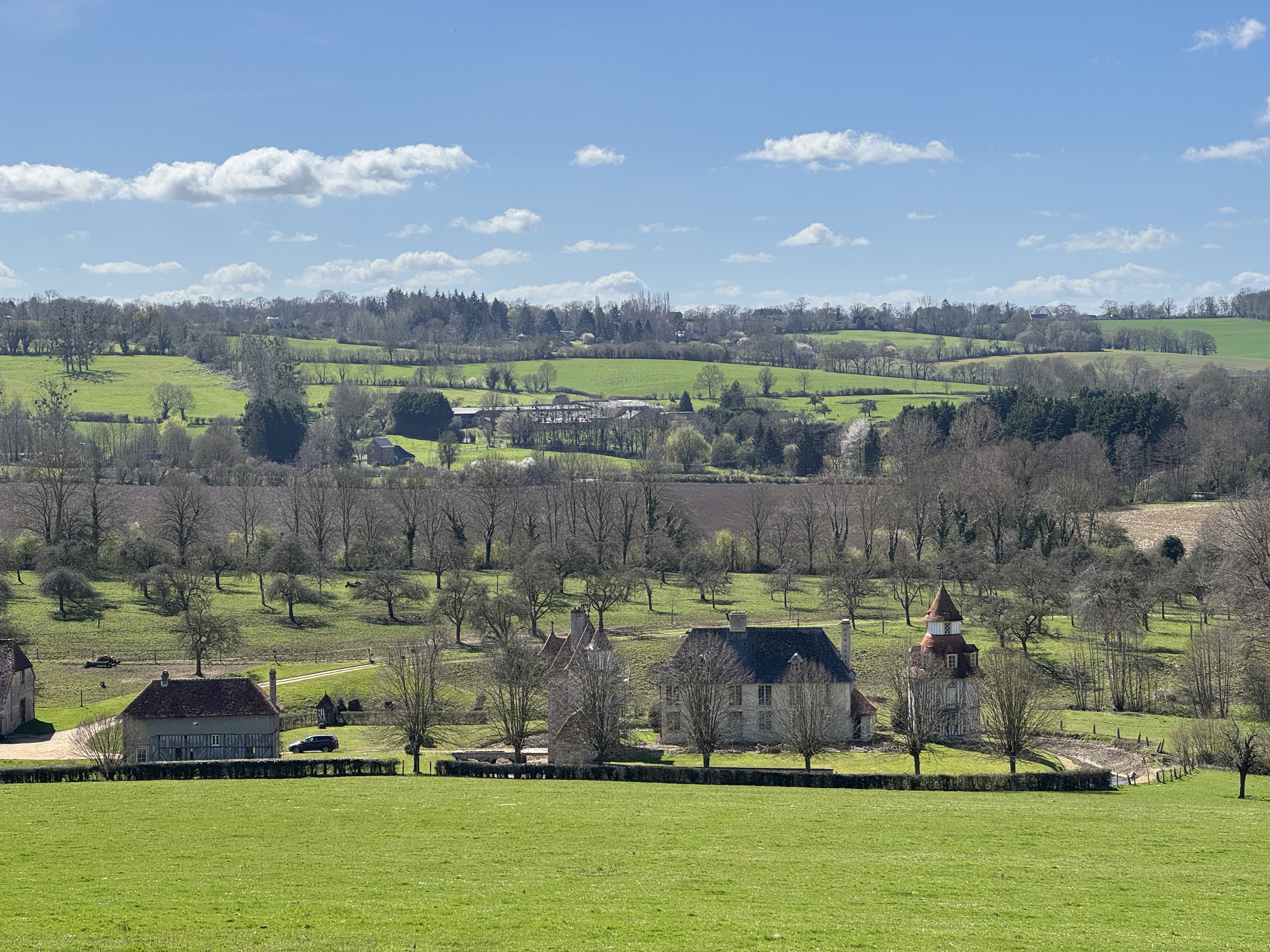
- Countryside of Montreuil-en-Auge
- Location of Montreuil-en-Auge
- Location within France Location within Normandy
- Coordinates: 49°10′19″N 0°03′20″E
- Country: France
- Region: Normandy
- Department: Calvados
- Arrondissement: Lisieux
- Canton: Mézidon Vallée d'Auge
- Intercommunality: CA Lisieux Normandie

Government
  - Mayor (2020–2026): Xavier Charles
- Area^{1}: 3.37 km^{2} (1.30 sq mi)
- Elevation: 53 m (174 ft)
- Highest elevation: 149 m (489 ft)
- Lowest elevation: 34 m (112 ft)
- Population (2023): 65
  - Density: 19/km^{2} (50/sq mi)
- Time zone: UTC+01:00 (CET)
  - Summer (DST): UTC+02:00 (CEST)
- INSEE/Postal code: 14448 /14340
- ^{1} French Land Register data, which excludes lakes, ponds, glaciers > 1 km^{2} (0.386 sq mi or 247 acres) and river estuaries.

Montreuil-en-Auge (French pronunciation: [mɔ̃tʁœj ɑ̃.n‿oʒ], literally Montreuil in Auge) is a commune in the department of Calvados in the Normandy region in northwestern France.

== Population ==
Historical population
Year	Pop.	±% p.a.
1968	51	—
1975	40	−3.41%
1982	42	+0.70%
1990	42	+0.00%
1999	53	+2.62%
2007	48	−1.23%
2012	51	+1.22%
2017	57	+2.25%
2023	65	+2.21%
Source: INSEE

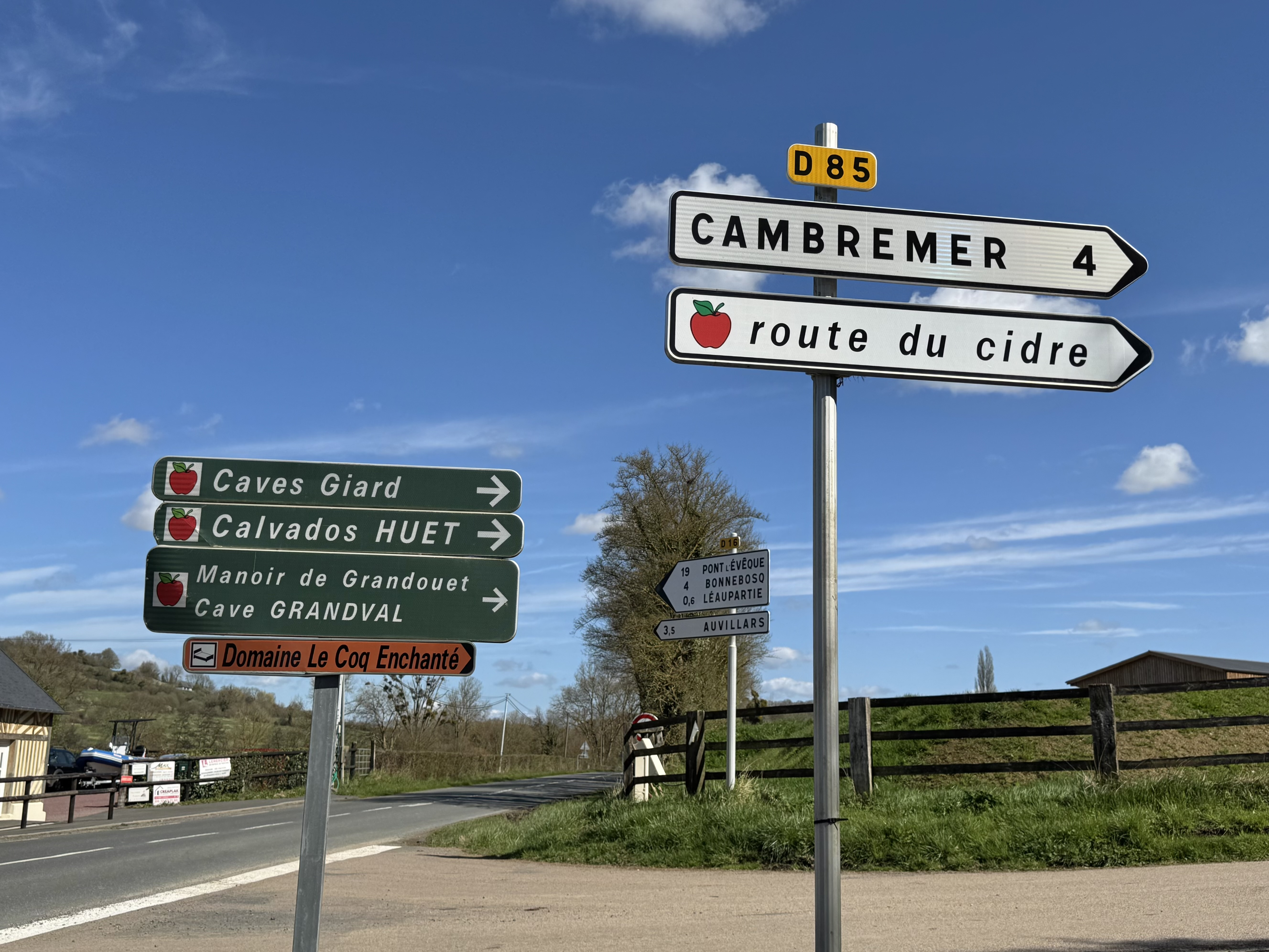
Signage for cider producers on the Route du Cidre

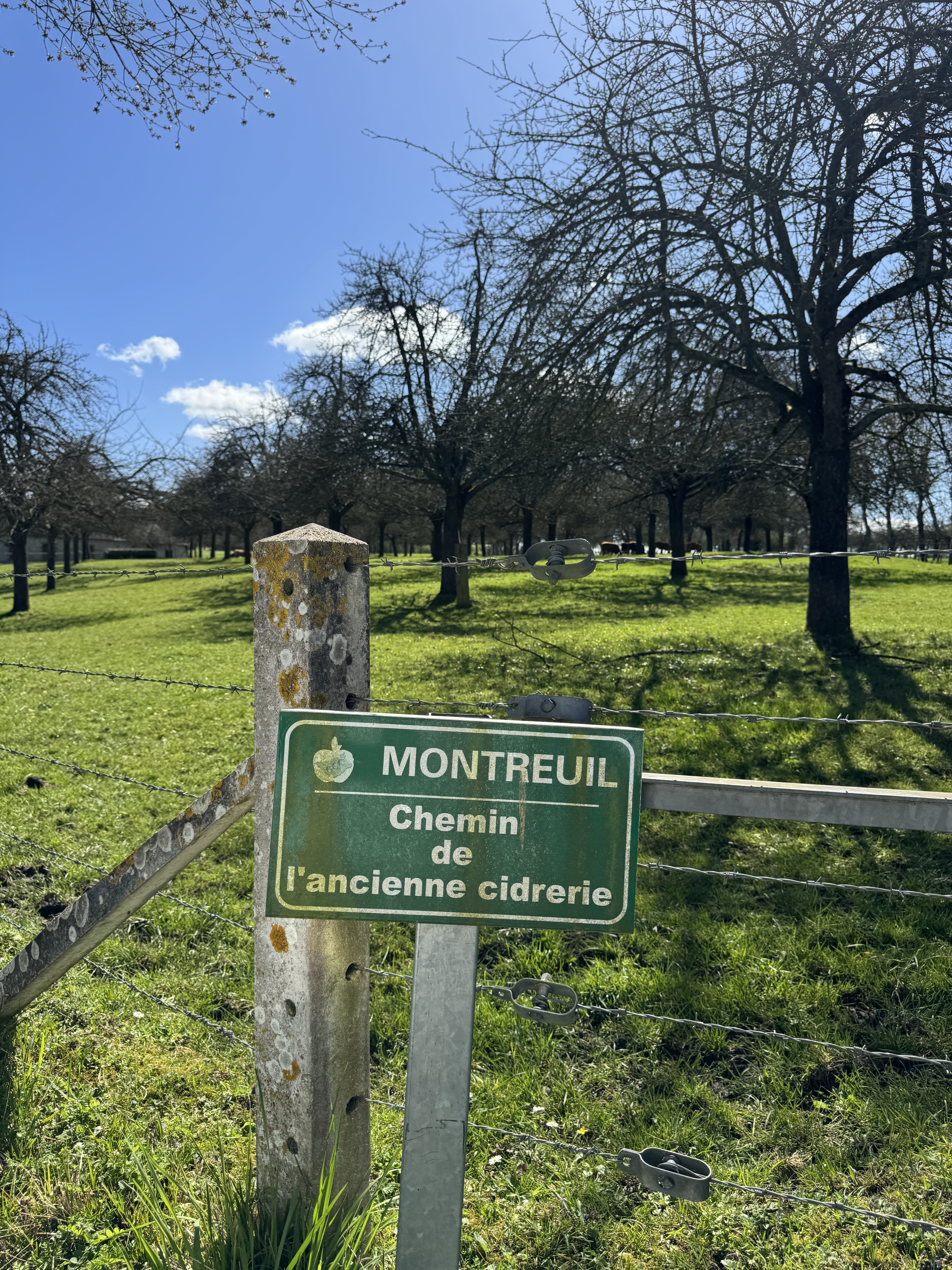
Chemin de l’ancienne cidrerie near old apple groves

== See also ==
- Communes of the Calvados department
