= Lisores =

- Commune
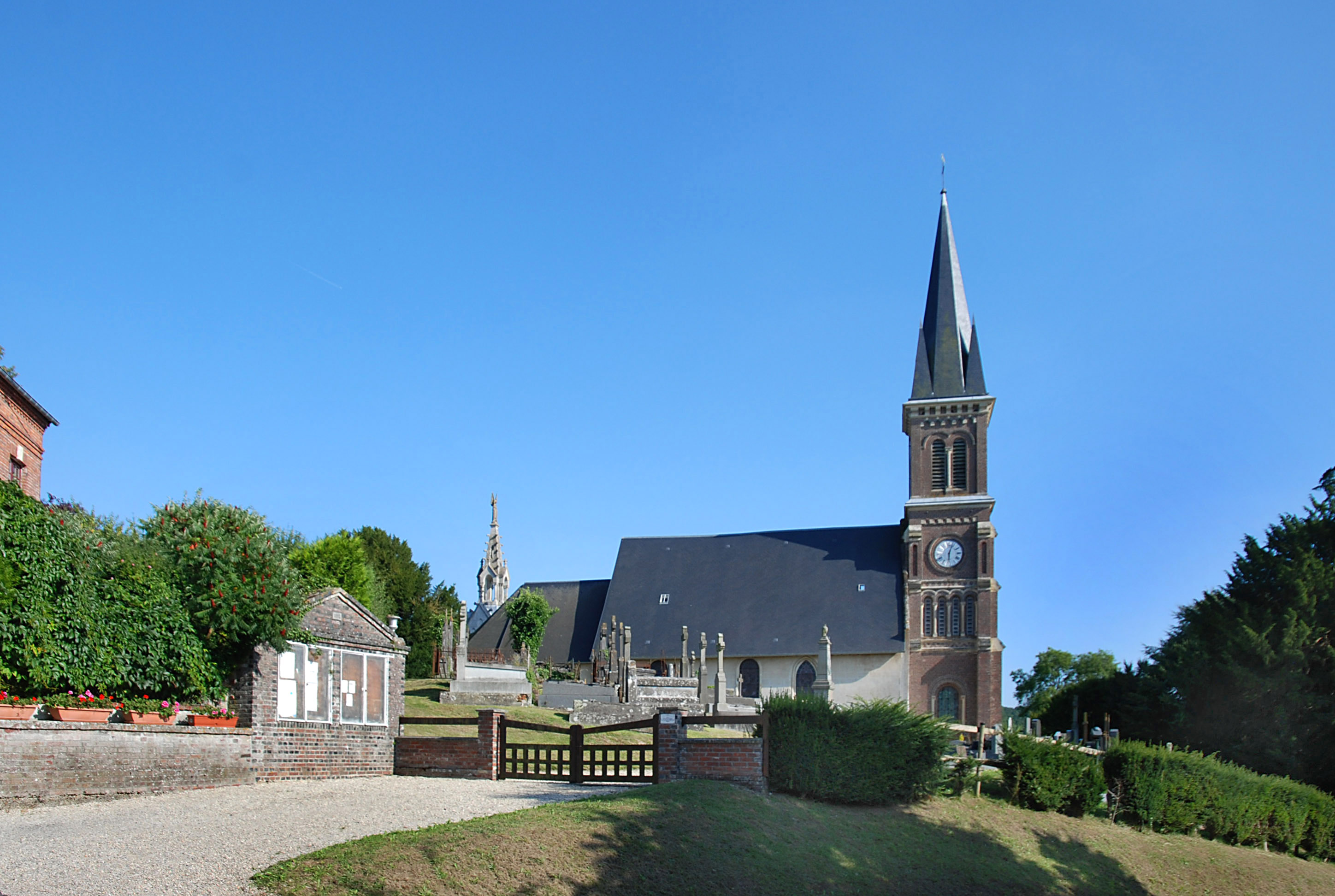
- The church in Lisores
- Location of Lisores
- Location within France Location within Normandy
- Coordinates: 48°57′44″N 0°12′18″E
- Country: France
- Region: Normandy
- Department: Calvados
- Arrondissement: Lisieux
- Canton: Livarot-Pays-d'Auge
- Intercommunality: CA Lisieux Normandie

Government
  - Mayor (2020–2026): Philippe Vigan
- Area^{1}: 11.91 km^{2} (4.60 sq mi)
- Elevation: 101 m (331 ft)
- Highest elevation: 214 m (702 ft)
- Lowest elevation: 82 m (269 ft)
- Population (2023): 260
  - Density: 22/km^{2} (57/sq mi)
- Time zone: UTC+01:00 (CET)
  - Summer (DST): UTC+02:00 (CEST)
- INSEE/Postal code: 14368 /14140
- ^{1} French Land Register data, which excludes lakes, ponds, glaciers > 1 km^{2} (0.386 sq mi or 247 acres) and river estuaries.

Lisores (French pronunciation: [lizɔʁ]) is a commune in the Calvados department in the Normandy region in northwestern France.

== Population ==
Historical population
| Year | Pop. | ±% p.a. |
|---|---|---|
| 1968 | 348 | — |
| 1975 | 247 | −4.78% |
| 1982 | 248 | +0.06% |
| 1990 | 247 | −0.05% |
| 1999 | 260 | +0.57% |
| 2007 | 289 | +1.33% |
| 2012 | 305 | +1.08% |
| 2017 | 260 | −3.14% |
| 2023 | 260 | +0.00% |
Source: INSEE

== See also ==
- Communes of the Calvados department
