= Cernay, Calvados =

Cernay
- Commune
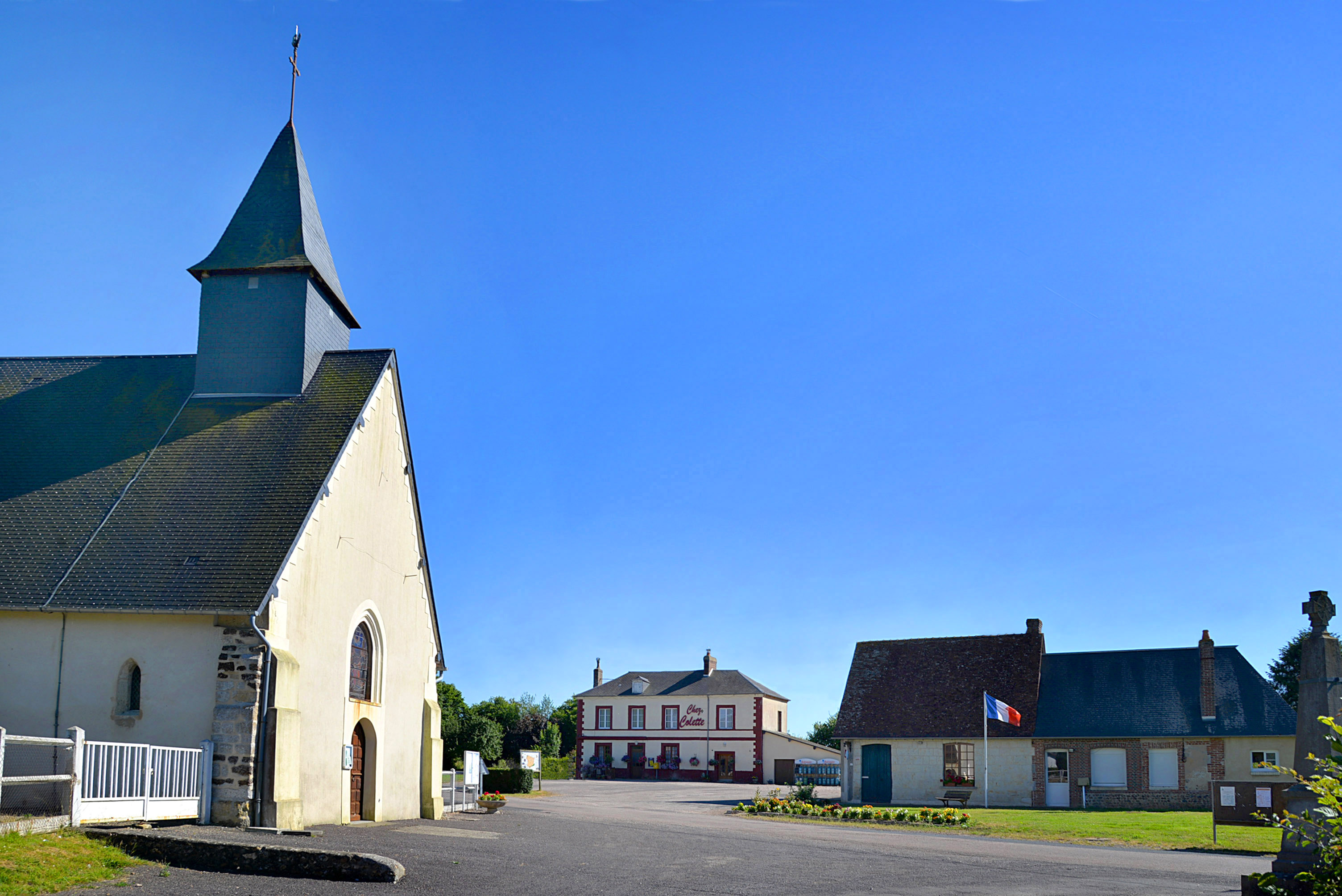
- The church and surroundings in Cernay
- Location of Cernay
- Location within France Location within Normandy
- Coordinates: 49°01′16″N 0°19′30″E
- Country: France
- Region: Normandy
- Department: Calvados
- Arrondissement: Lisieux
- Canton: Livarot-Pays-d'Auge
- Intercommunality: CA Lisieux Normandie

Government
  - Mayor (2020–2026): Geneviève Wassner
- Area^{1}: 5.82 km^{2} (2.25 sq mi)
- Elevation: 184 m (604 ft)
- Highest elevation: 201 m (659 ft)
- Lowest elevation: 144 m (472 ft)
- Population (2023): 137
  - Density: 23.5/km^{2} (61.0/sq mi)
- Time zone: UTC+01:00 (CET)
  - Summer (DST): UTC+02:00 (CEST)
- INSEE/Postal code: 14147 /14290
- ^{1} French Land Register data, which excludes lakes, ponds, glaciers > 1 km^{2} (0.386 sq mi or 247 acres) and river estuaries.

Cernay (French pronunciation: [sɛʁnɛ]) is a commune in the Calvados department in the Normandy region in northwestern France.

== Population ==
Historical population
Year	Pop.	±% p.a.
1968	139	—
1975	133	−0.63%
1982	119	−1.58%
1990	106	−1.44%
1999	109	+0.31%
2007	117	+0.89%
2012	152	+5.37%
2017	141	−1.49%
2023	137	−0.48%
Source: INSEE

== See also ==
- Communes of the Calvados department
