= Le Pin, Calvados =

Le Pin
- Commune
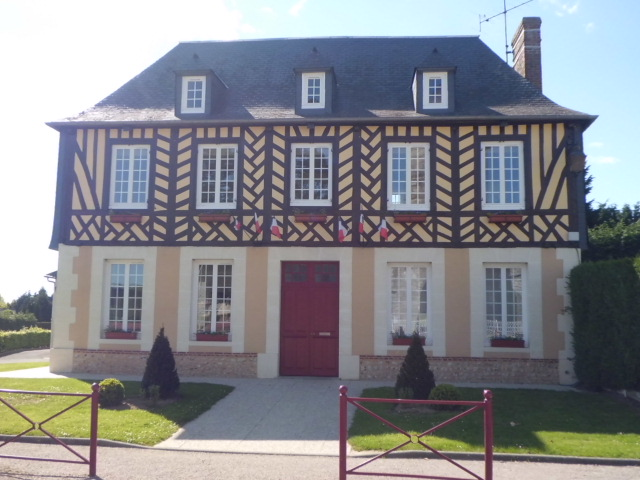
- Town hall
- Location of Le Pin
- Location within France Location within Normandy
- Coordinates: 49°12′43″N 0°20′11″E
- Country: France
- Region: Normandy
- Department: Calvados
- Arrondissement: Lisieux
- Canton: Pont-l'Évêque
- Intercommunality: CA Lisieux Normandie

Government
  - Mayor (2020–2026): Isabelle Leroy
- Area^{1}: 11.53 km^{2} (4.45 sq mi)
- Elevation: 145 m (476 ft)
- Highest elevation: 159 m (522 ft)
- Lowest elevation: 100 m (330 ft)
- Population (2023): 797
  - Density: 69.1/km^{2} (179/sq mi)
- Time zone: UTC+01:00 (CET)
  - Summer (DST): UTC+02:00 (CEST)
- INSEE/Postal code: 14504 /14590
- ^{1} French Land Register data, which excludes lakes, ponds, glaciers > 1 km^{2} (0.386 sq mi or 247 acres) and river estuaries.

Le Pin (French pronunciation: [lə pɛ̃]) is a commune in the Calvados department in the Normandy region in northwestern France.

== Population ==
Historical population
Year	Pop.	±% p.a.
1968	372	—
1975	314	−2.39%
1982	389	+3.11%
1990	477	+2.58%
1999	481	+0.09%
2007	698	+4.76%
2012	755	+1.58%
2017	812	+1.47%
2023	797	−0.31%
Source: INSEE

== See also ==
- Communes of the Calvados department
