= Saint-Denis-de-Mailloc =

- Commune
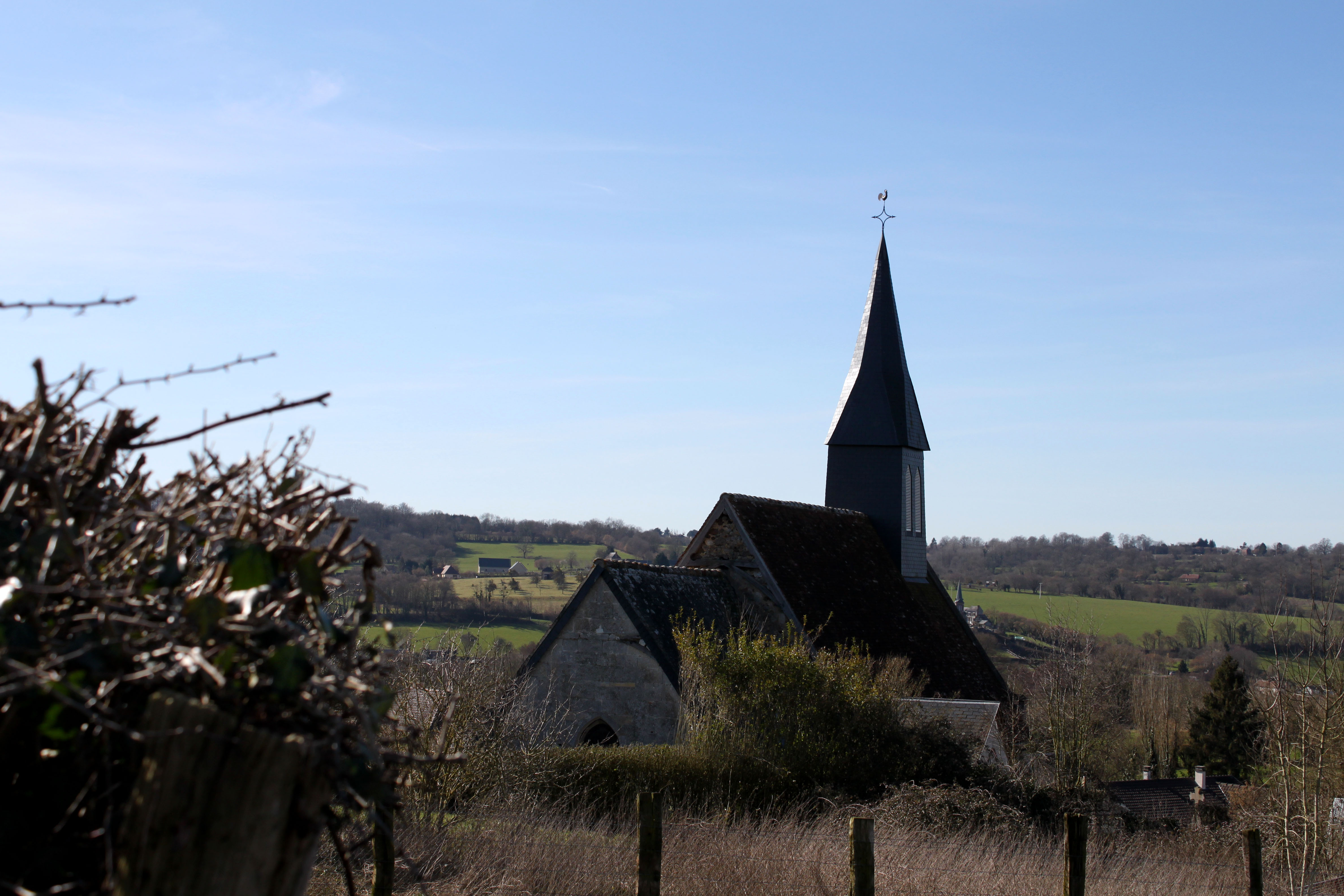
- The church in Saint-Denis-de-Mailloc

- Coat of arms
- Location of Saint-Denis-de-Mailloc
- Location within France Location within Normandy
- Coordinates: 49°05′35″N 0°18′48″E
- Country: France
- Region: Normandy
- Department: Calvados
- Arrondissement: Lisieux
- Canton: Livarot-Pays-d'Auge
- Intercommunality: CA Lisieux Normandie

Government
  - Mayor (2020–2026): Philippe Ratel
- Area^{1}: 4.25 km^{2} (1.64 sq mi)
- Elevation: 168 m (551 ft)
- Highest elevation: 174 m (571 ft)
- Lowest elevation: 64 m (210 ft)
- Population (2023): 296
  - Density: 69.6/km^{2} (180/sq mi)
- Time zone: UTC+01:00 (CET)
  - Summer (DST): UTC+02:00 (CEST)
- INSEE/Postal code: 14571 /14100
- ^{1} French Land Register data, which excludes lakes, ponds, glaciers > 1 km^{2} (0.386 sq mi or 247 acres) and river estuaries.

Saint-Denis-de-Mailloc (French pronunciation: [sɛ̃ dəni də majo]) is a commune in the Calvados department, region of Normandy, northwestern France.

== Population ==
Historical population
Year	Pop.	±% p.a.
1968	198	—
1975	322	+7.19%
1982	350	+1.20%
1990	351	+0.04%
1999	314	−1.23%
2007	320	+0.24%
2012	305	−0.96%
2017	301	−0.26%
2023	296	−0.28%
Source: INSEE

== See also ==
- Communes of the Calvados department
