= Notre-Dame-de-Livaye =

- Commune
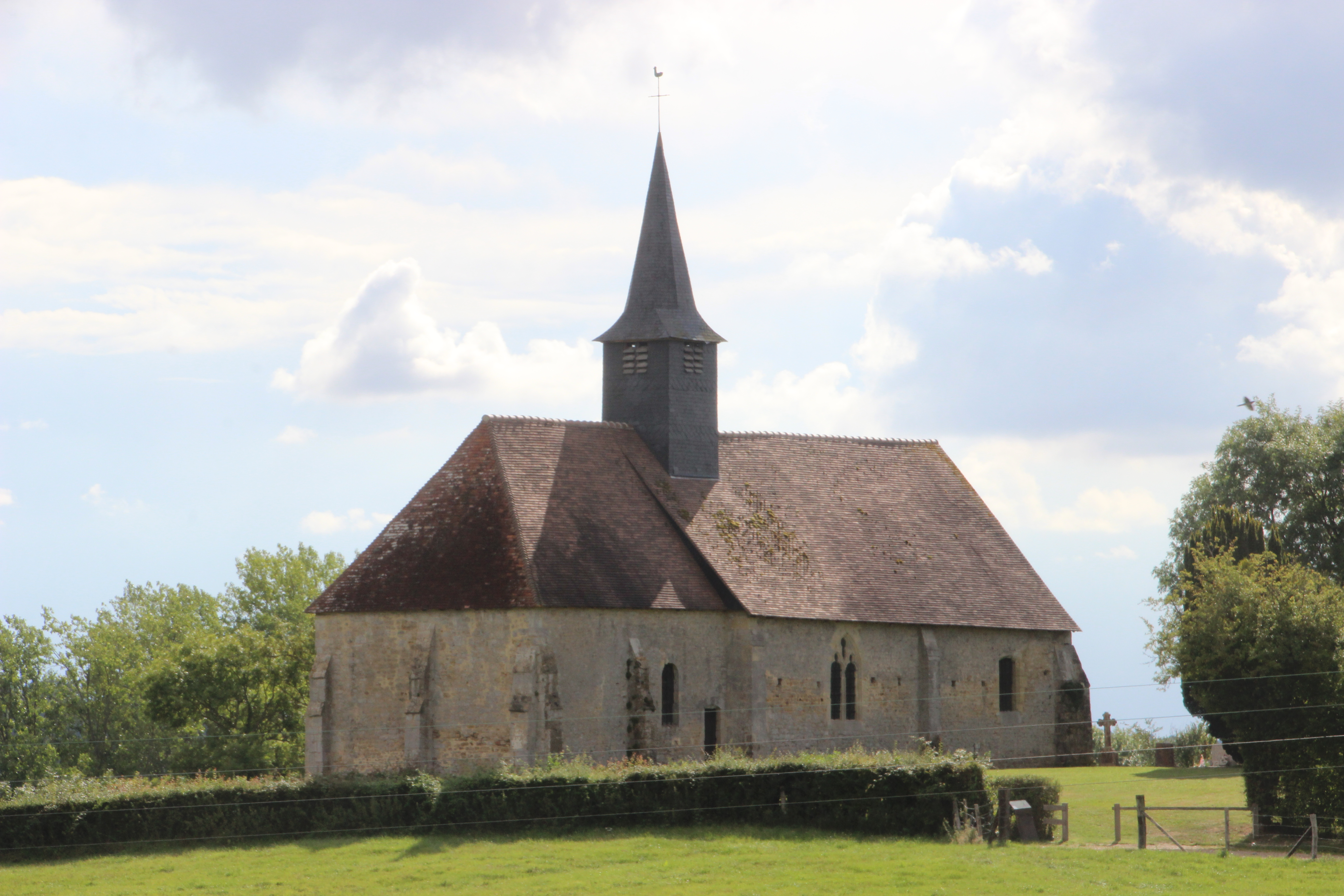
- The church in Notre-Dame-de-Livaye
- Location of Notre-Dame-de-Livaye
- Location within France Location within Normandy
- Coordinates: 49°06′56″N 0°02′29″E
- Country: France
- Region: Normandy
- Department: Calvados
- Arrondissement: Lisieux
- Canton: Mézidon Vallée d'Auge
- Intercommunality: CA Lisieux Normandie

Government
  - Mayor (2020–2026): Daniel Chedeville
- Area^{1}: 2.67 km^{2} (1.03 sq mi)
- Elevation: 20 m (66 ft)
- Highest elevation: 96 m (315 ft)
- Lowest elevation: 19 m (62 ft)
- Population (2023): 105
  - Density: 39.3/km^{2} (102/sq mi)
- Time zone: UTC+01:00 (CET)
  - Summer (DST): UTC+02:00 (CEST)
- INSEE/Postal code: 14473 /14340
- ^{1} French Land Register data, which excludes lakes, ponds, glaciers > 1 km^{2} (0.386 sq mi or 247 acres) and river estuaries.

Notre-Dame-de-Livaye (French pronunciation: [nɔtʁ dam də livɛ]) is a commune in the Calvados department in the Normandy region in northwestern France.

== Population ==
Historical population
Year	Pop.	±% p.a.
1968	107	—
1975	107	+0.00%
1982	109	+0.26%
1990	125	+1.73%
1999	130	+0.44%
2007	132	+0.19%
2012	128	−0.61%
2017	117	−1.78%
2023	105	−1.79%
Source: INSEE

== See also ==
- Communes of the Calvados department
