= Saint-Martin-de-Mailloc =

- Commune
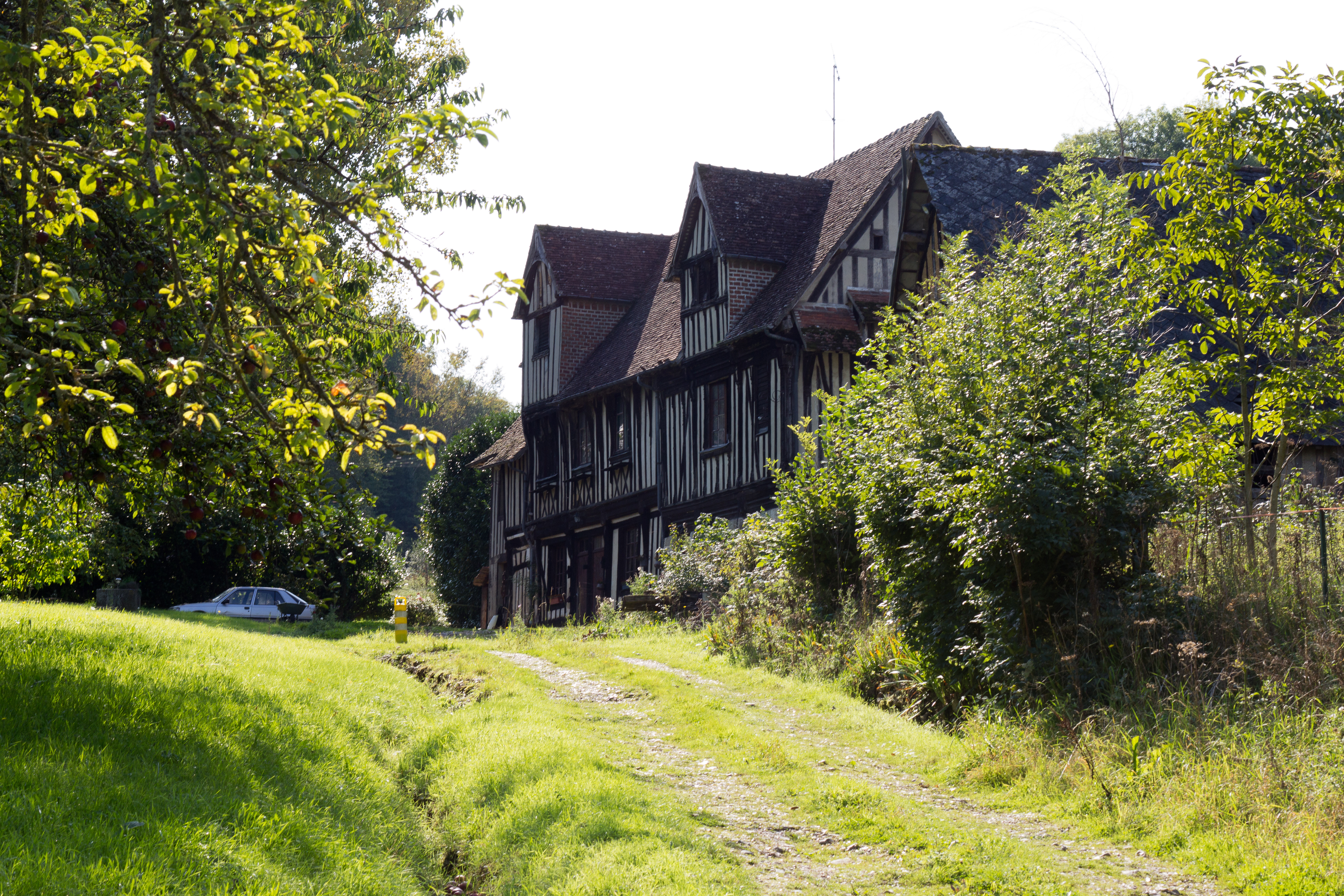
- The manor of La Masselinée

- Coat of arms
- Location of Saint-Martin-de-Mailloc
- Location within France Location within Normandy
- Coordinates: 49°05′26″N 0°17′59″E
- Country: France
- Region: Normandy
- Department: Calvados
- Arrondissement: Lisieux
- Canton: Mézidon Vallée d'Auge
- Intercommunality: CA Lisieux Normandie

Government
  - Mayor (2020–2026): Thierry Ecolasse
- Area^{1}: 7.17 km^{2} (2.77 sq mi)
- Elevation: 140 m (460 ft)
- Highest elevation: 173 m (568 ft)
- Lowest elevation: 61 m (200 ft)
- Population (2023): 1,040
  - Density: 145/km^{2} (376/sq mi)
- Time zone: UTC+01:00 (CET)
  - Summer (DST): UTC+02:00 (CEST)
- INSEE/Postal code: 14626 /14100
- ^{1} French Land Register data, which excludes lakes, ponds, glaciers > 1 km^{2} (0.386 sq mi or 247 acres) and river estuaries.

Saint-Martin-de-Mailloc (French pronunciation: [sɛ̃ maʁtɛ̃ də majɔ]) is a commune in the Calvados department in the Normandy region in northwestern France. It is twinned with Chawleigh, England.

== Population ==
Historical population
Year	Pop.	±% p.a.
1968	355	—
1975	419	+2.40%
1982	593	+5.09%
1990	711	+2.29%
1999	659	−0.84%
2007	838	+3.05%
2012	877	+0.91%
2017	902	+0.56%
2023	1,040	+2.40%
Source: INSEE

== See also ==
- Communes of the Calvados department
