= Lessard-et-le-Chêne =

- Commune
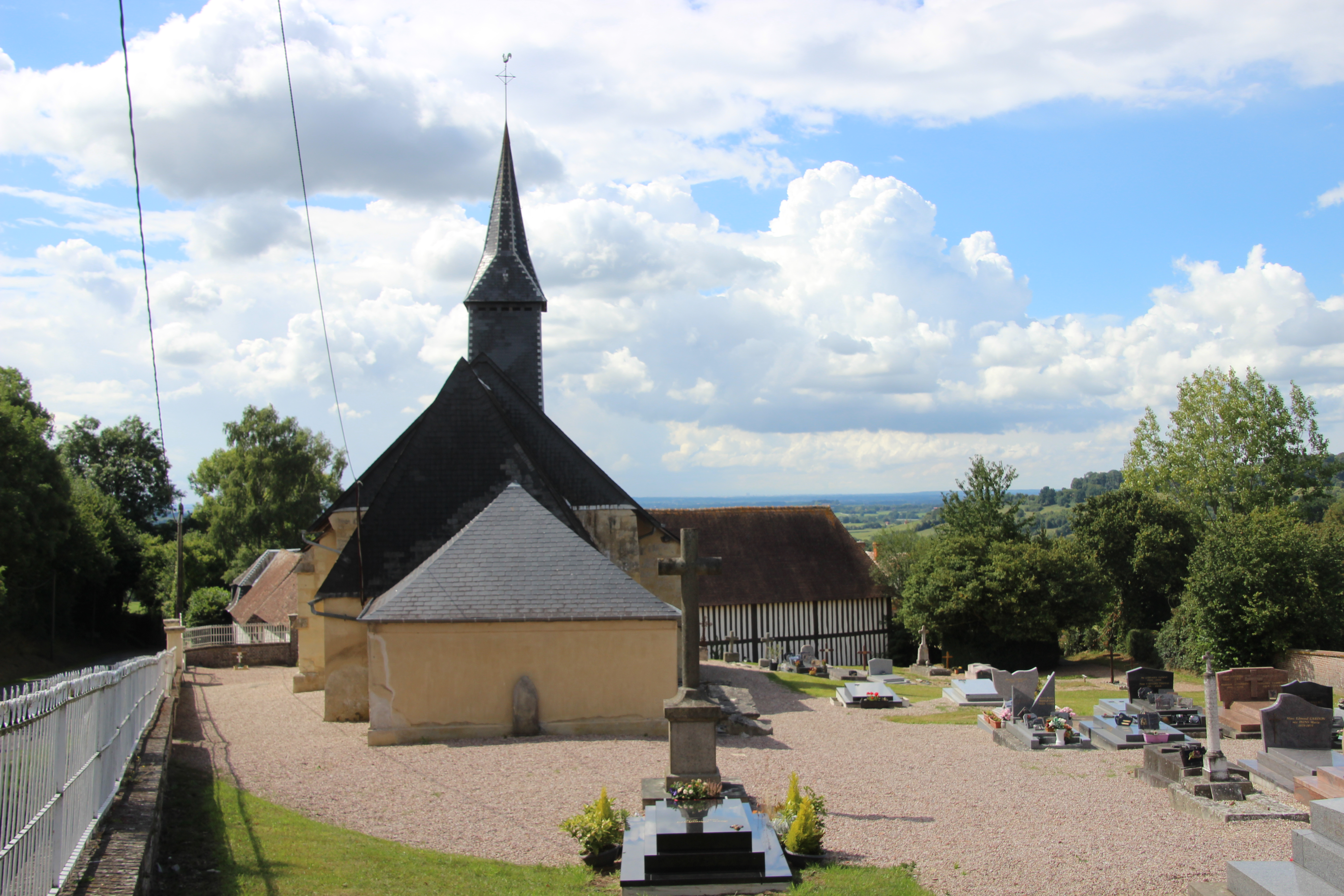
- The church in Lessard-et-le-Chêne
- Location of Lessard-et-le-Chêne
- Location within France Location within Normandy
- Coordinates: 49°04′29″N 0°07′11″E
- Country: France
- Region: Normandy
- Department: Calvados
- Arrondissement: Lisieux
- Canton: Mézidon Vallée d'Auge
- Intercommunality: CA Lisieux Normandie

Government
  - Mayor (2020–2026): Marielle Garmond
- Area^{1}: 10.09 km^{2} (3.90 sq mi)
- Elevation: 140 m (460 ft)
- Highest elevation: 173 m (568 ft)
- Lowest elevation: 30 m (98 ft)
- Population (2023): 152
  - Density: 15.1/km^{2} (39.0/sq mi)
- Time zone: UTC+01:00 (CET)
  - Summer (DST): UTC+02:00 (CEST)
- INSEE/Postal code: 14362 /14140
- ^{1} French Land Register data, which excludes lakes, ponds, glaciers > 1 km^{2} (0.386 sq mi or 247 acres) and river estuaries.

Lessard-et-le-Chêne (French pronunciation: [lɛsaʁ e lə ʃɛːn]) is a commune in the Calvados department in the Normandy region in northwestern France.

== Population ==
Historical population
Year	Pop.	±% p.a.
1968	255	—
1975	202	−3.27%
1982	189	−0.95%
1990	176	−0.89%
1999	175	−0.06%
2007	157	−1.35%
2012	154	−0.39%
2017	158	+0.51%
2023	152	−0.64%
Source: INSEE

== See also ==
- Communes of the Calvados department
