= Les Monceaux =

- Commune
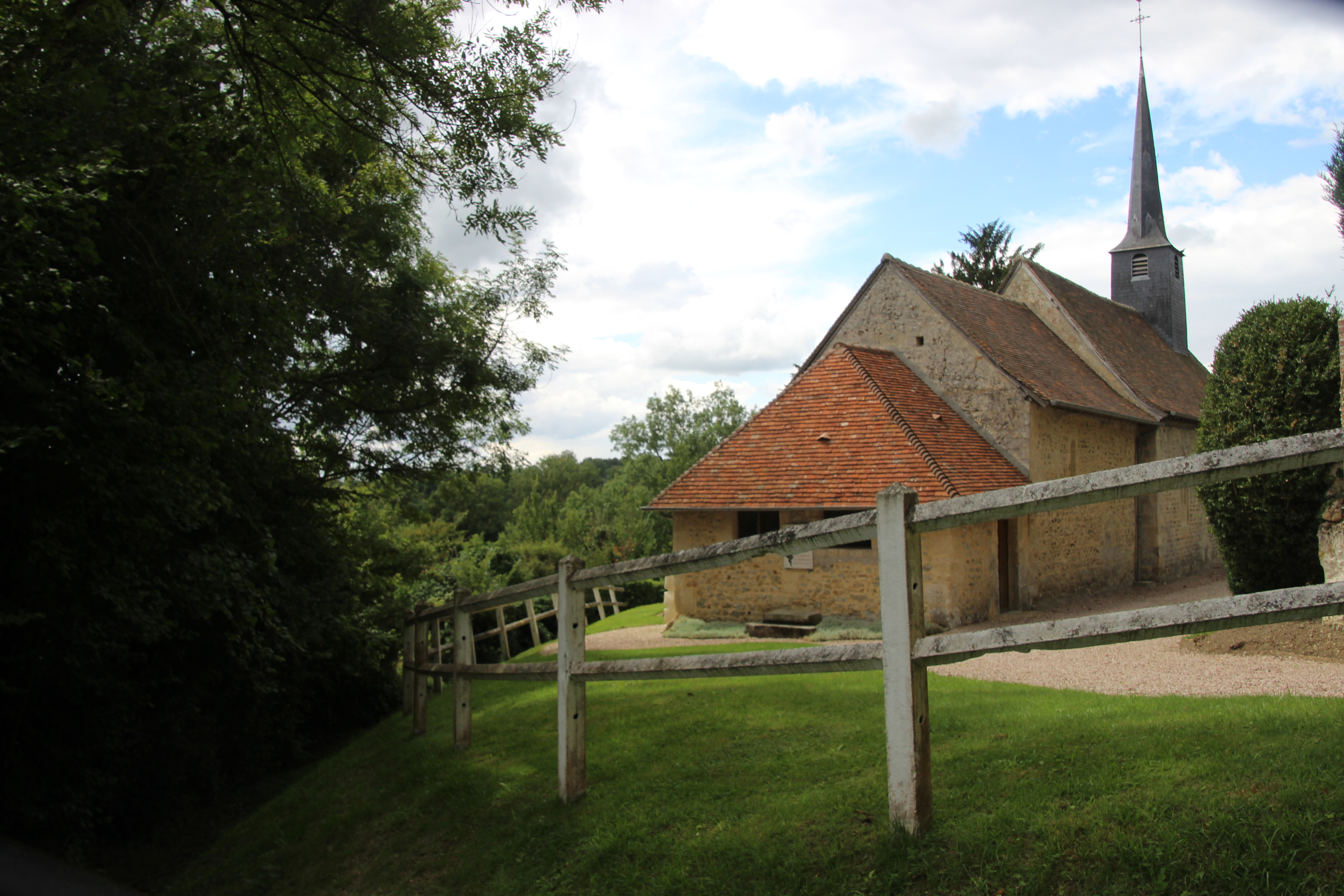
- The church in Les Monceaux
- Location of Les Monceaux
- Location within France Location within Normandy
- Coordinates: 49°07′00″N 0°07′29″E
- Country: France
- Region: Normandy
- Department: Calvados
- Arrondissement: Lisieux
- Canton: Mézidon Vallée d'Auge
- Intercommunality: CA Lisieux Normandie

Government
  - Mayor (2020–2026): Didier Pellerin
- Area^{1}: 3.72 km^{2} (1.44 sq mi)
- Elevation: 270 m (890 ft)
- Highest elevation: 176 m (577 ft)
- Lowest elevation: 104 m (341 ft)
- Population (2023): 198
  - Density: 53.2/km^{2} (138/sq mi)
- Time zone: UTC+01:00 (CET)
  - Summer (DST): UTC+02:00 (CEST)
- INSEE/Postal code: 14435 /14100
- ^{1} French Land Register data, which excludes lakes, ponds, glaciers > 1 km^{2} (0.386 sq mi or 247 acres) and river estuaries.

Les Monceaux (French pronunciation: [le mɔ̃so]) is a commune in the Calvados department in the Normandy region of northwestern France.

== Population ==
Historical population
| Year | Pop. | ±% p.a. |
|---|---|---|
| 1968 | 125 | — |
| 1975 | 121 | −0.46% |
| 1982 | 145 | +2.62% |
| 1990 | 147 | +0.17% |
| 1999 | 146 | −0.08% |
| 2007 | 171 | +2.00% |
| 2012 | 179 | +0.92% |
| 2017 | 181 | +0.22% |
| 2023 | 198 | +1.51% |
Source: INSEE

== See also ==
- Communes of the Calvados department
