= Canton of Livarot-Pays-d'Auge =

Coordinates: 49.01°N 0.15°E

Livarot-Pays-d'Auge
- Canton
- Interactive map of Livarot-Pays-d'Auge
- Country: France
- Region: Normandy
- Department: Calvados
- No. of communes: {{{nbcomm}}}

Government
  - Representatives (2021–2028): Vanessa Bonhomme Duchemin; Olivier Anfry
- Area: 472.40 km^{2} (182.39 sq mi)
- Population (2023): 21,569
  - Density: 45.658/km^{2} (118.25/sq mi)
- INSEE code: 14 18

The canton of Livarot-Pays-d'Auge (before 2021: Livarot) is an administrative division of the Calvados department, northwestern France. Its borders were modified at the French canton reorganisation which came into effect in March 2015. Its seat is in Livarot-Pays-d'Auge.

== Composition ==
It consists of the following communes:

1. Cernay
2. La Folletière-Abenon
3. Lisores
4. Livarot-Pays-d'Auge
5. Orbec
6. Saint-Denis-de-Mailloc
7. Saint-Martin-de-Bienfaite-la-Cressonnière
8. Saint-Pierre-en-Auge
9. Val-de-Vie
10. Valorbiquet
11. Vendeuvre
12. La Vespière-Friardel

== Councillors ==
Election	Councillors	Party	Occupation
2015	Sébastien Leclerc	LR	Former mayor of Livarot (2008-2015); Mayor of Livarot-Pays-d'Auge (2016-2017); Member of the National Assembly for Calvados (since 2017)
2015	Véronique Maymaud	DVD	Delegate mayor of Vaudeloges

== Pictures of the canton ==
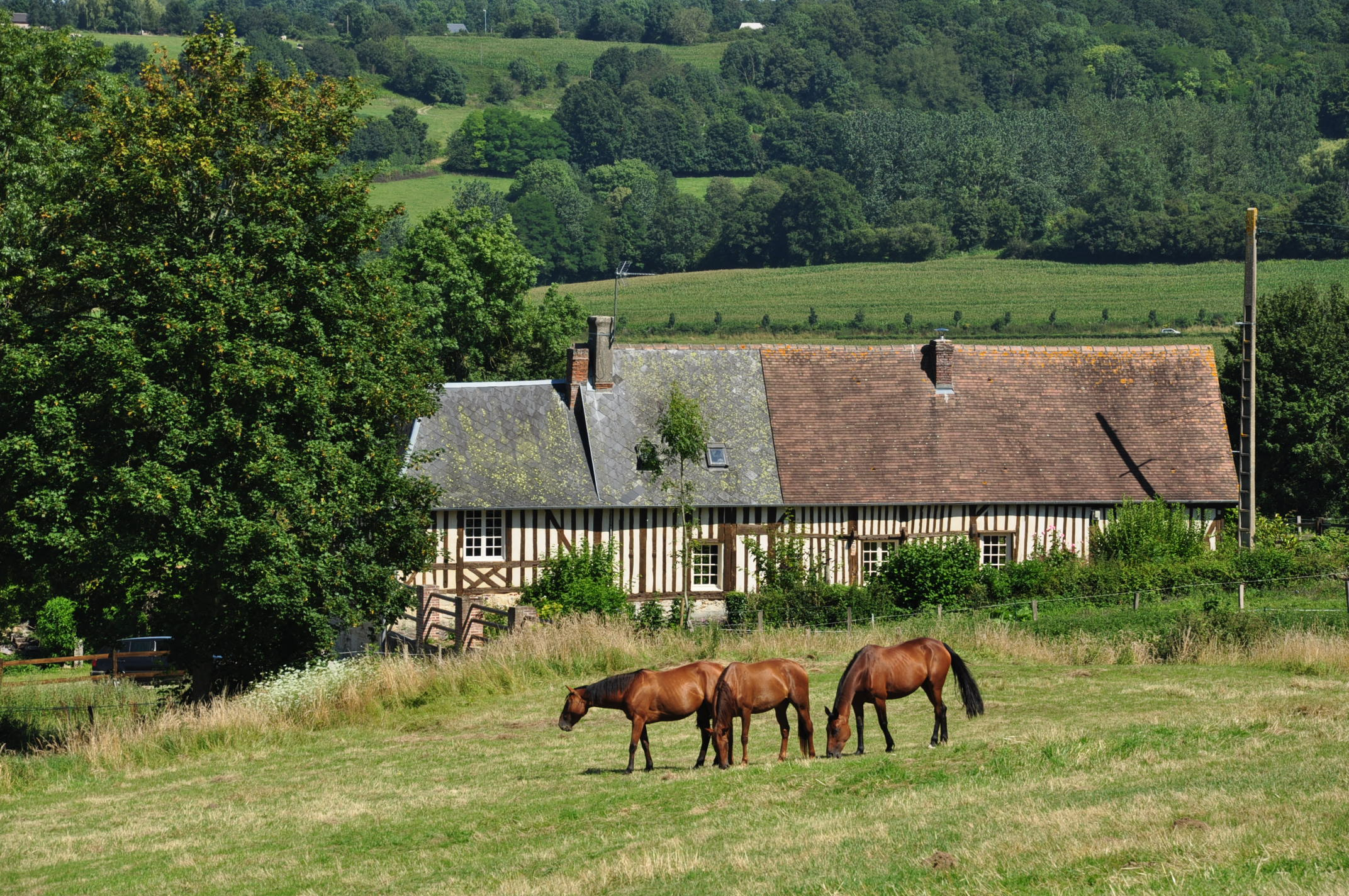
Landscape in Livarot-Pays-d'Auge

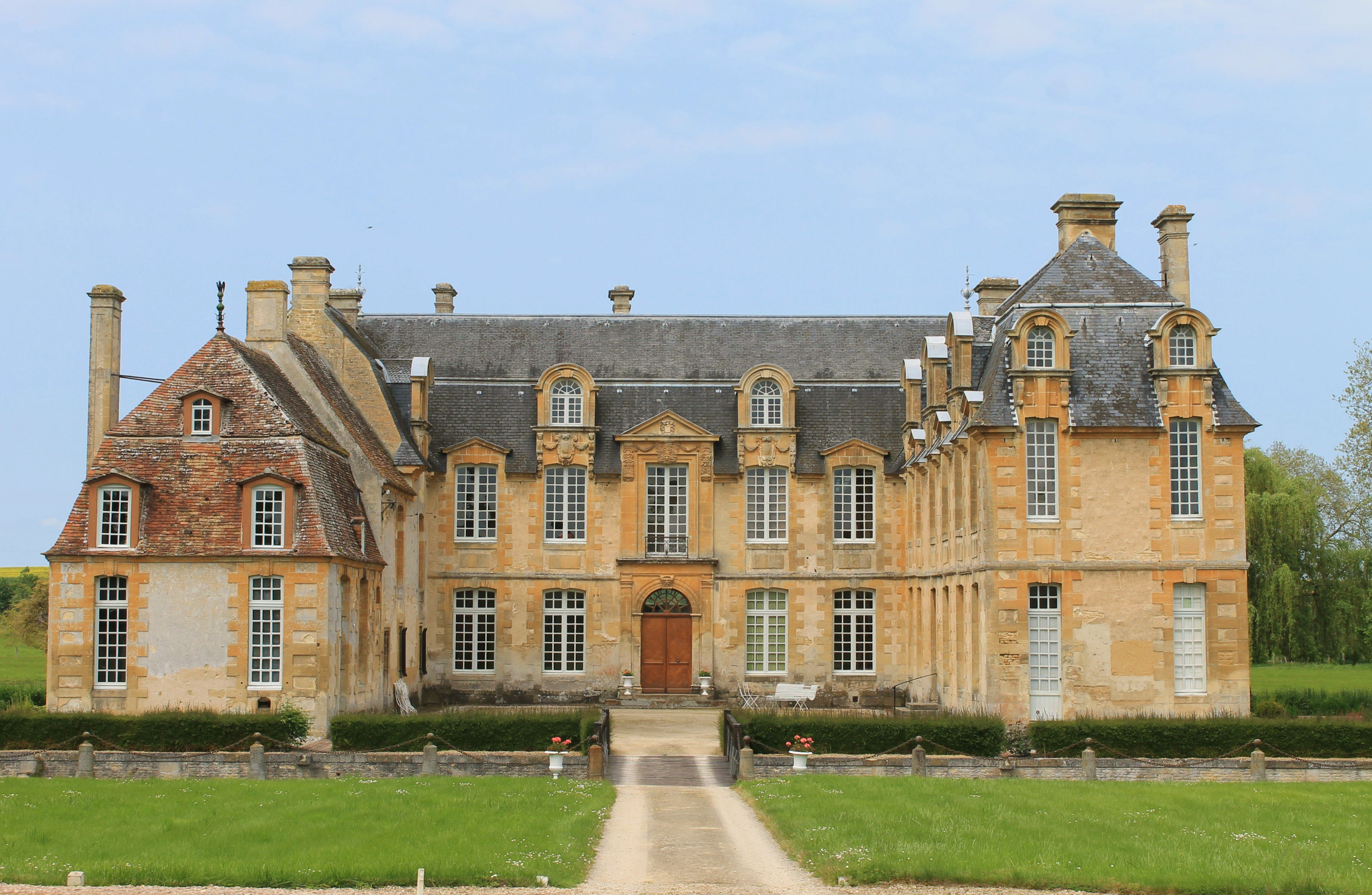
Carel Castle in Saint-Pierre-en-Auge

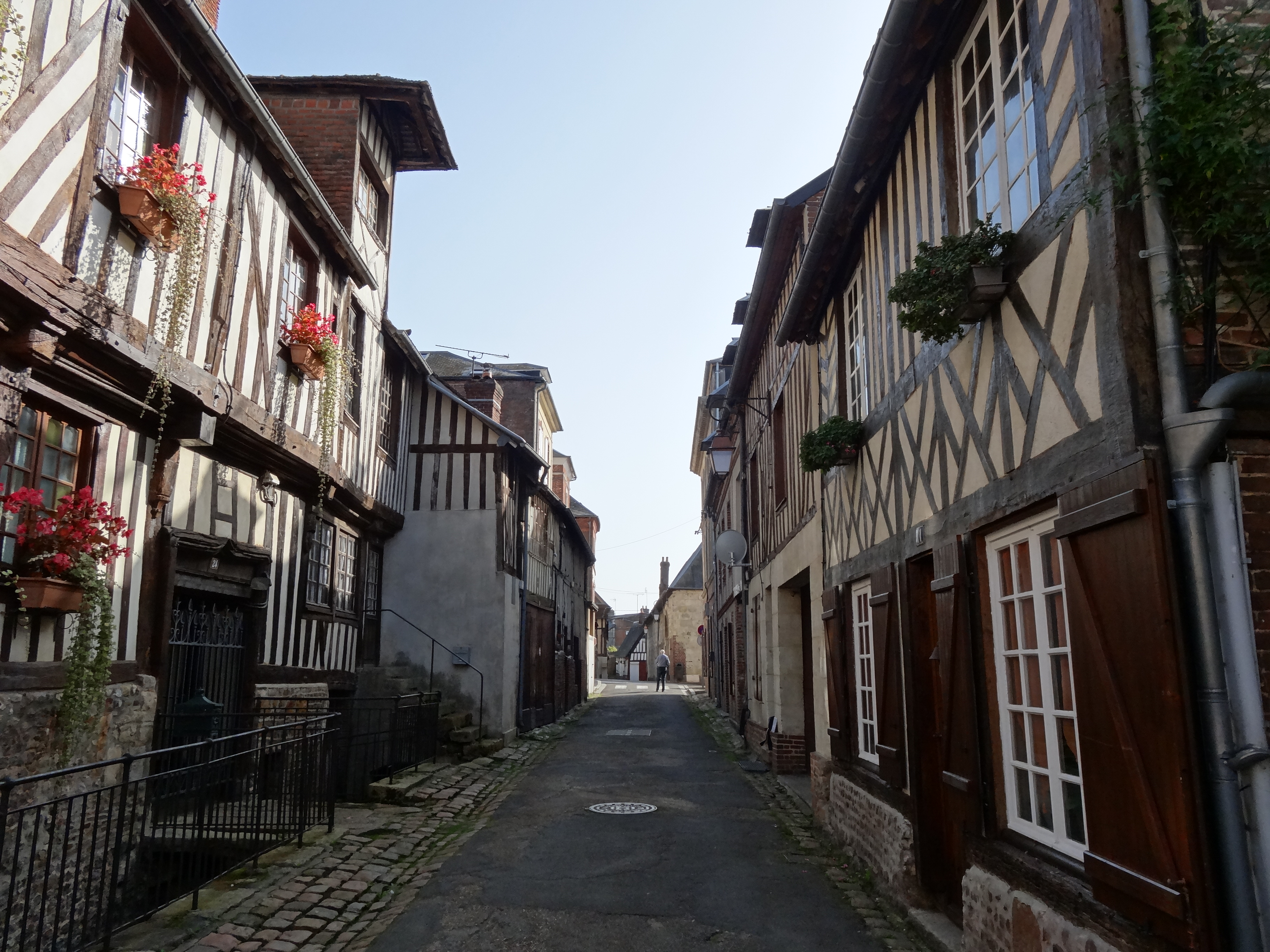
Street in Orbec
