= Orbec =

- Commune
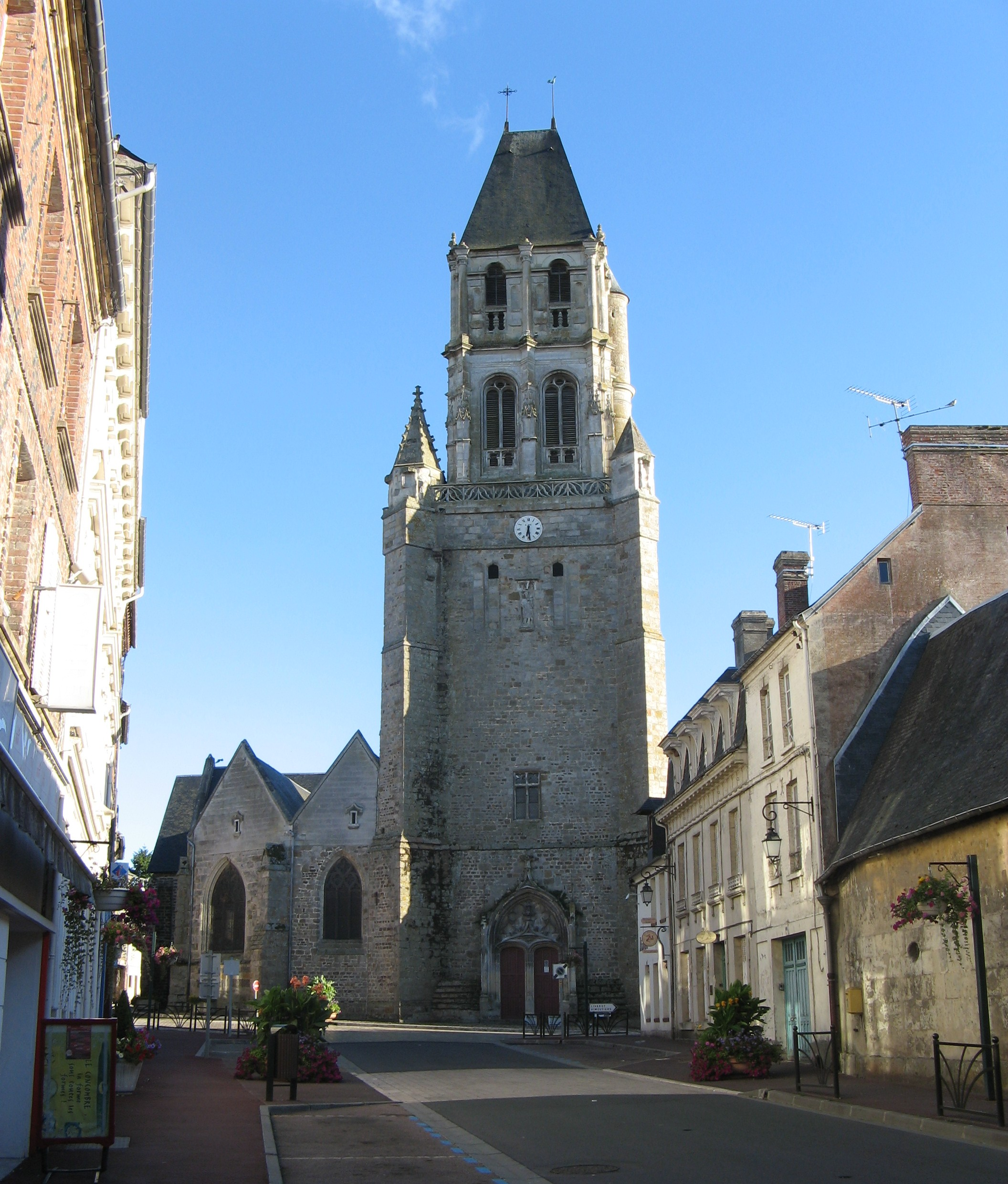
- The church in Orbec

- Coat of arms
- Location of Orbec
- Location within France Location within Normandy
- Coordinates: 49°01′20″N 0°24′27″E
- Country: France
- Region: Normandy
- Department: Calvados
- Arrondissement: Lisieux
- Canton: Livarot-Pays-d'Auge
- Intercommunality: CA Lisieux Normandie

Government
  - Mayor (2020–2026): Étienne Cool
- Area^{1}: 10.14 km^{2} (3.92 sq mi)
- Elevation: 110 m (360 ft)
- Highest elevation: 193 m (633 ft)
- Lowest elevation: 90 m (300 ft)
- Population (2023): 1,975
  - Density: 194.8/km^{2} (504.5/sq mi)
- Time zone: UTC+01:00 (CET)
  - Summer (DST): UTC+02:00 (CEST)
- INSEE/Postal code: 14478 /14290
- ^{1} French Land Register data, which excludes lakes, ponds, glaciers > 1 km^{2} (0.386 sq mi or 247 acres) and river estuaries.

Orbec (French pronunciation: [ɔʁbɛk]) is a commune in the Calvados department in the Normandy region in northwestern France.

== Population ==
Historical population
Year	Pop.	±% p.a.
1968	3,211	—
1975	3,363	+0.66%
1982	2,832	−2.43%
1990	2,642	−0.86%
1999	2,564	−0.33%
2007	2,400	−0.82%
2012	2,248	−1.30%
2017	2,013	−2.18%
2023	1,975	−0.32%
Source: INSEE

== International relations ==
Orbec is twinned with:

- Kingsteignton UK since 1979
- Frammersbach (Germany) since 1987

== See also ==
- Communes of the Calvados department
