= Communauté d'agglomération Lisieux Normandie =

Coordinates: 49.14°N 0.23°E

Lisieux Normandie
- Communauté d'agglomération
- Country: France
- Region: Normandy
- Department: Calvados
- No. of communes: {{{nbcomm}}}
- Established: 2017
- Area: 951.6 km^{2} (367.4 sq mi)
- Population (2019): 73,252
  - Density: 76.98/km^{2} (199.4/sq mi)

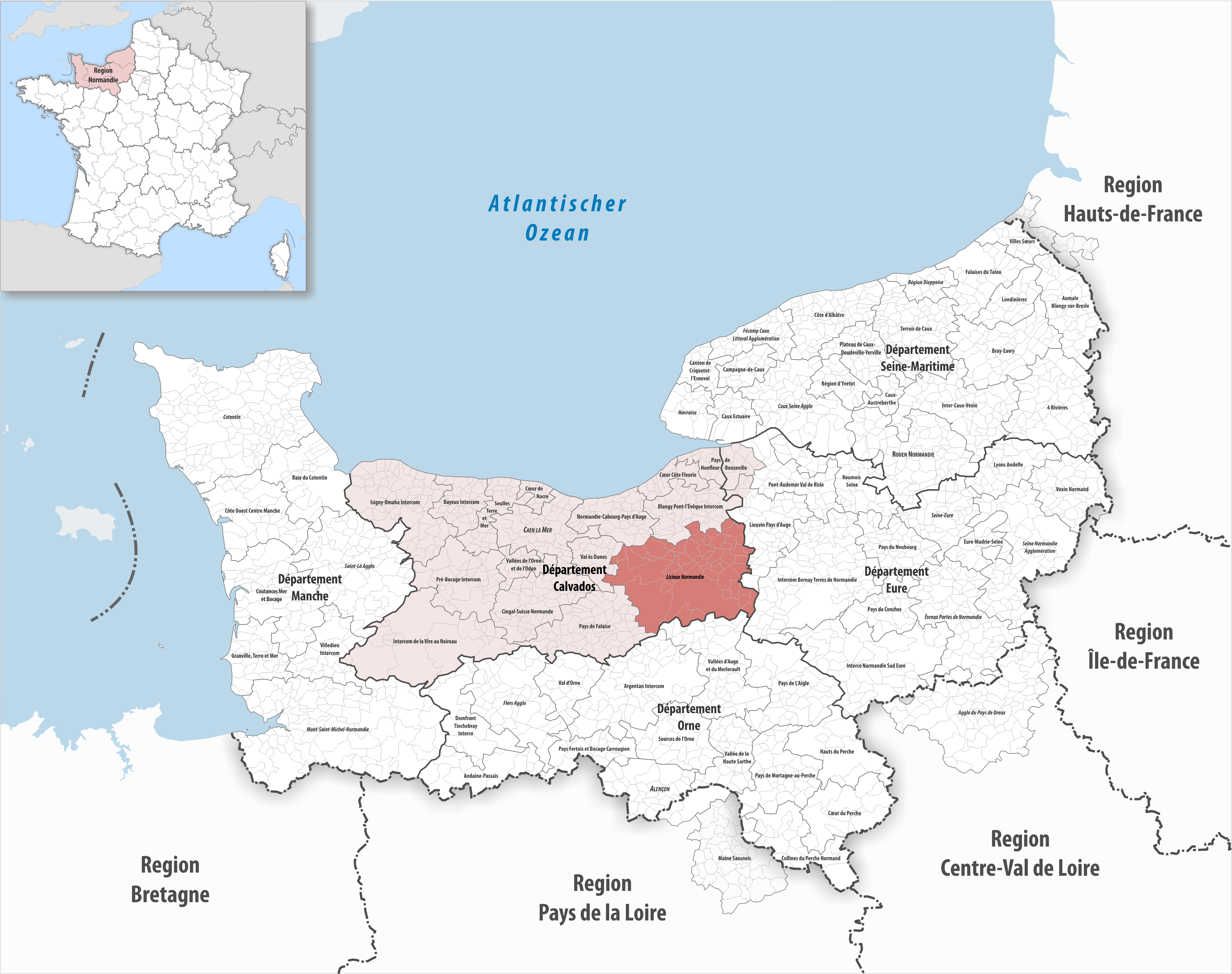

Communauté d'agglomération Lisieux Normandie is the communauté d'agglomération, an intercommunal structure, centred on the town of Lisieux. It is located in the Calvados department, in the Normandy region, northwestern France. It was created in January 2017 by the merger of the former communautés de communes Lintercom Lisieux - Pays d'Auge - Normandie, Vallée d'Auge, Trois Rivières, Pays de Livarot and Pays de l'Orbiquet. It was expanded with six communes from the former communautés de communes de Cambremer in January 2018. Its area is 951.6 km^{2}. Its population was 73,252 in 2019, of which 20,038 in Lisieux proper. Its seat is in Lisieux.

== Communes ==
The communauté d'agglomération consists of the following 53 communes:

1. Belle Vie en Auge
2. Beuvillers
3. La Boissière
4. Cambremer
5. Castillon-en-Auge
6. Cernay
7. Coquainvilliers
8. Cordebugle
9. Courtonne-la-Meurdrac
10. Courtonne-les-Deux-Églises
11. Fauguernon
12. Firfol
13. La Folletière-Abenon
14. Fumichon
15. Glos
16. Hermival-les-Vaux
17. L'Hôtellerie
18. La Houblonnière
19. Lessard-et-le-Chêne
20. Lisieux
21. Lisores
22. Livarot-Pays-d'Auge
23. Marolles
24. Méry-Bissières-en-Auge
25. Le Mesnil-Eudes
26. Le Mesnil-Guillaume
27. Le Mesnil-Simon
28. Mézidon Vallée d'Auge
29. Les Monceaux
30. Montreuil-en-Auge
31. Moyaux
32. Notre-Dame-de-Livaye
33. Notre-Dame-d'Estrées-Corbon
34. Orbec
35. Ouilly-du-Houley
36. Ouilly-le-Vicomte
37. Le Pin
38. Le Pré-d'Auge
39. Prêtreville
40. Rocques
41. Saint-Denis-de-Mailloc
42. Saint-Désir
43. Saint-Germain-de-Livet
44. Saint-Jean-de-Livet
45. Saint-Martin-de-Bienfaite-la-Cressonnière
46. Saint-Martin-de-la-Lieue
47. Saint-Martin-de-Mailloc
48. Saint-Ouen-le-Pin
49. Saint-Pierre-des-Ifs
50. Saint-Pierre-en-Auge
51. Val-de-Vie
52. Valorbiquet
53. La Vespière-Friardel
