= Saint-Jean-de-Livet =

- Commune
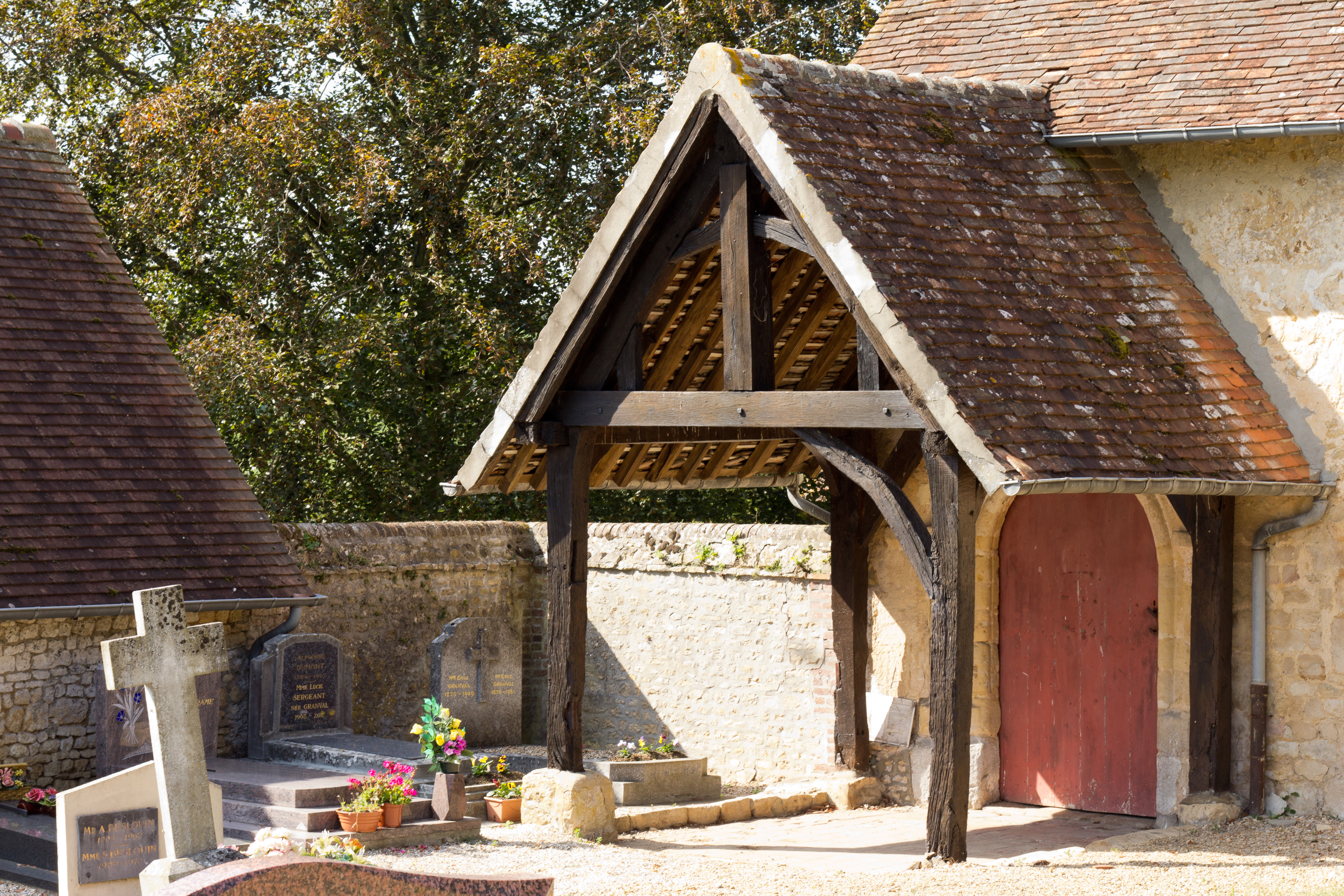
- The porch of the church in Saint-Jean-de-Livet
- Location of Saint-Jean-de-Livet
- Location within France Location within Normandy
- Coordinates: 49°05′50″N 0°15′03″E
- Country: France
- Region: Normandy
- Department: Calvados
- Arrondissement: Lisieux
- Canton: Mézidon Vallée d'Auge
- Intercommunality: CA Lisieux Normandie

Government
  - Mayor (2020–2026): Maxime Givone
- Area^{1}: 3.47 km^{2} (1.34 sq mi)
- Elevation: 60 m (200 ft)
- Highest elevation: 172 m (564 ft)
- Lowest elevation: 58 m (190 ft)
- Population (2023): 229
  - Density: 66.0/km^{2} (171/sq mi)
- Time zone: UTC+01:00 (CET)
  - Summer (DST): UTC+02:00 (CEST)
- INSEE/Postal code: 14595 /14100
- ^{1} French Land Register data, which excludes lakes, ponds, glaciers > 1 km^{2} (0.386 sq mi or 247 acres) and river estuaries.

Saint-Jean-de-Livet (French pronunciation: [sɛ̃ ʒɑ̃ də livɛ]) is a commune in the Calvados department in the Normandy region in northern France.

== Population ==
Historical population
Year	Pop.	±% p.a.
1968	96	—
1975	108	+1.70%
1982	215	+10.34%
1990	231	+0.90%
1999	233	+0.10%
2007	202	−1.77%
2012	200	−0.20%
2017	221	+2.02%
2023	229	+0.59%
Source: INSEE

== See also ==
- Communes of the Calvados department
