= Le Mesnil-Simon, Calvados =

Le Mesnil-Simon
- Commune
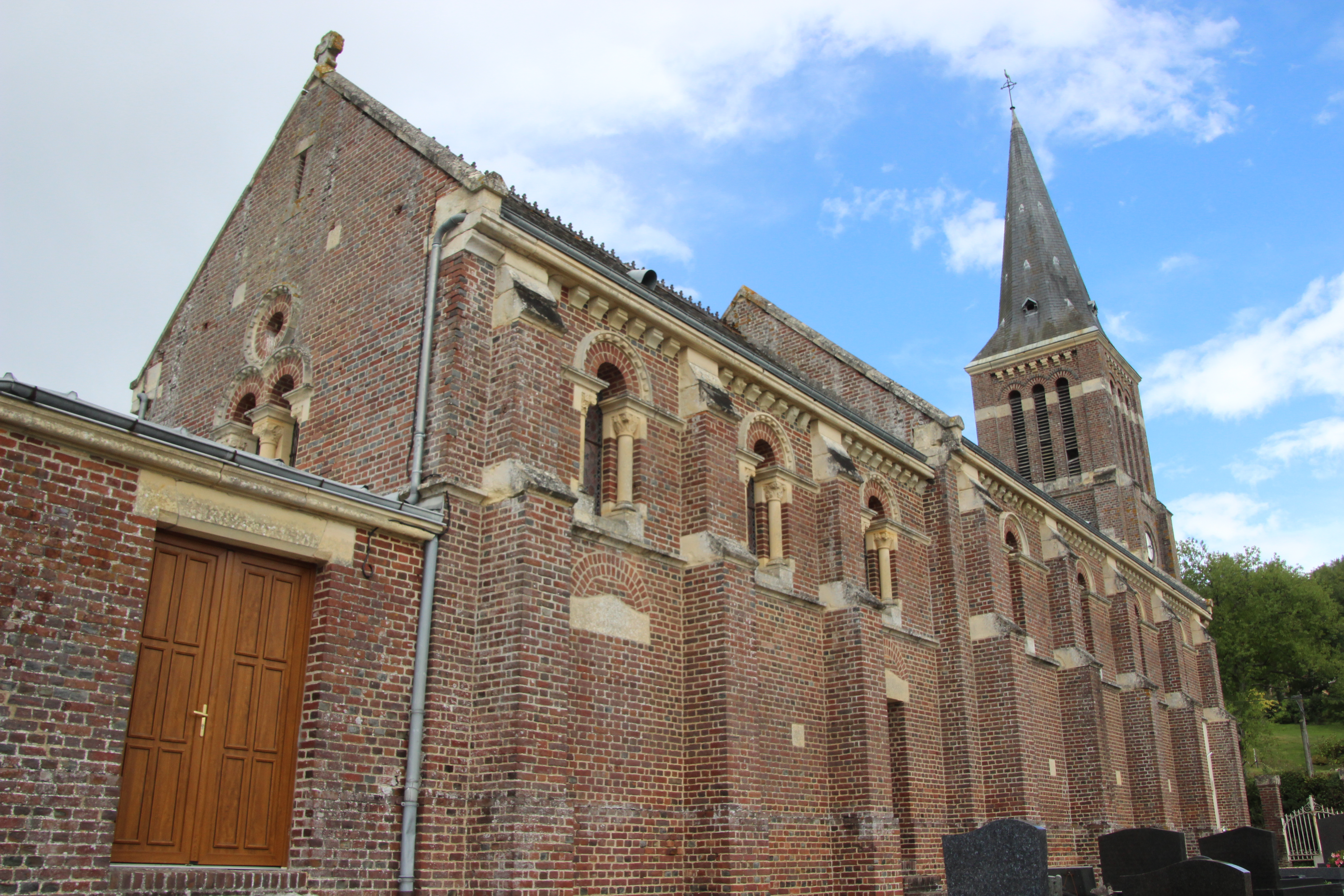
- The church in Le Mesnil-Simon
- Location of Le Mesnil-Simon
- Location within France Location within Normandy
- Coordinates: 49°05′31″N 0°06′23″E
- Country: France
- Region: Normandy
- Department: Calvados
- Arrondissement: Lisieux
- Canton: Mézidon Vallée d'Auge
- Intercommunality: CA Lisieux Normandie

Government
  - Mayor (2020–2026): Daniel Jehanne
- Area^{1}: 9.59 km^{2} (3.70 sq mi)
- Elevation: 80 m (260 ft)
- Highest elevation: 173 m (568 ft)
- Lowest elevation: 27 m (89 ft)
- Population (2023): 158
  - Density: 16.5/km^{2} (42.7/sq mi)
- Time zone: UTC+01:00 (CET)
  - Summer (DST): UTC+02:00 (CEST)
- INSEE/Postal code: 14425 /14140
- ^{1} French Land Register data, which excludes lakes, ponds, glaciers > 1 km^{2} (0.386 sq mi or 247 acres) and river estuaries.

Le Mesnil-Simon is a commune in the Calvados department in the Normandy region in northwestern France.

== Population ==
Historical population
Year	Pop.	±% p.a.
1968	163	—
1975	163	+0.00%
1982	150	−1.18%
1990	128	−1.96%
1999	155	+2.15%
2007	164	+0.71%
2012	161	−0.37%
2017	180	+2.26%
2023	158	−2.15%
Source: INSEE

== See also ==
- Le Mesnil-Simon, Eure-et-Loir
- Communes of the Calvados department
