= Le Mesnil-Eudes =

- Commune
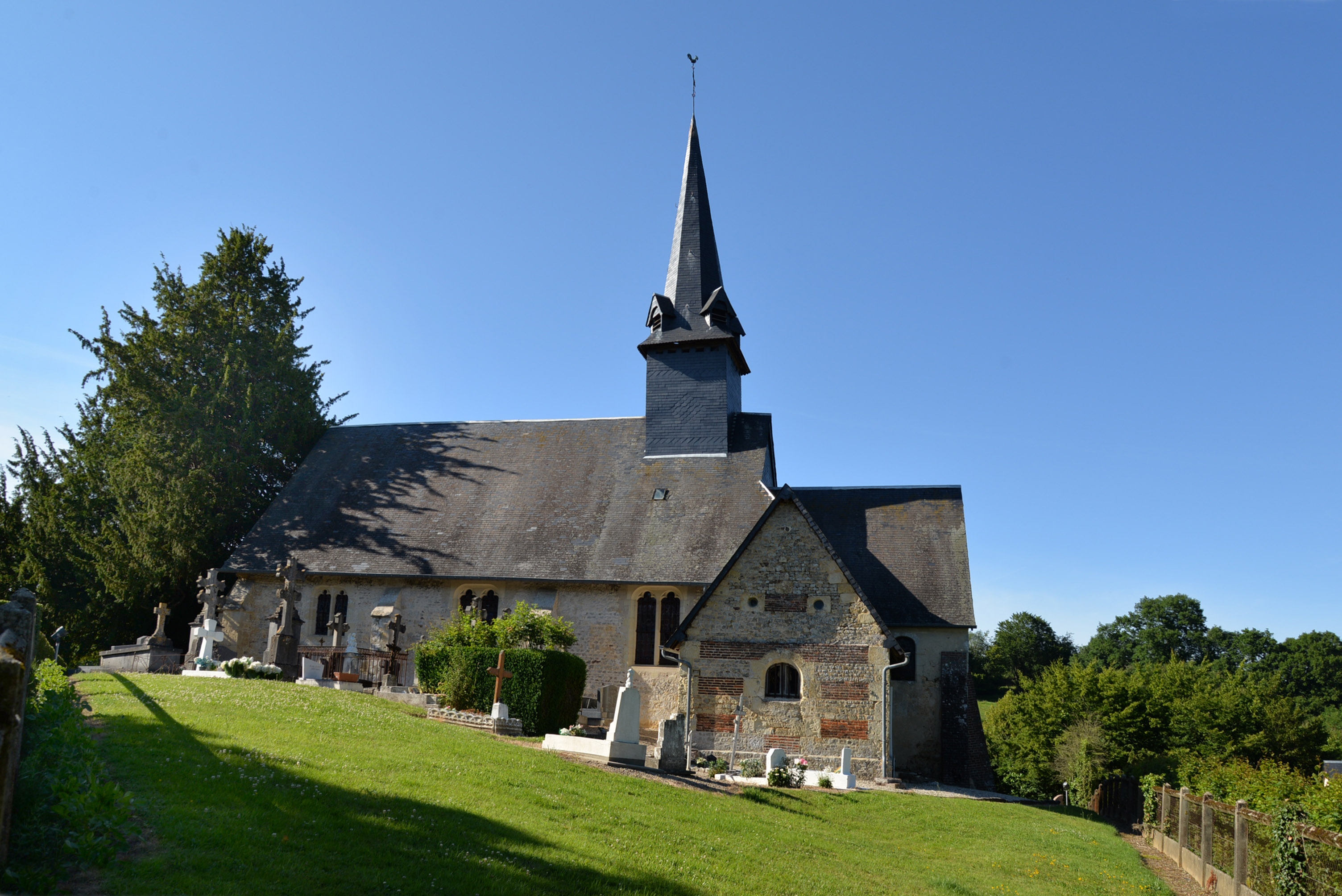
- The church in Le Mesnil-Eudes
- Location of Le Mesnil-Eudes
- Location within France Location within Normandy
- Coordinates: 49°05′37″N 0°10′51″E
- Country: France
- Region: Normandy
- Department: Calvados
- Arrondissement: Lisieux
- Canton: Mézidon Vallée d'Auge
- Intercommunality: CA Lisieux Normandie

Government
  - Mayor (2020–2026): Christian Decourty
- Area^{1}: 8.42 km^{2} (3.25 sq mi)
- Elevation: 100 m (330 ft)
- Highest elevation: 176 m (577 ft)
- Lowest elevation: 60 m (200 ft)
- Population (2023): 252
  - Density: 29.9/km^{2} (77.5/sq mi)
- Time zone: UTC+01:00 (CET)
  - Summer (DST): UTC+02:00 (CEST)
- INSEE/Postal code: 14419 /14100
- ^{1} French Land Register data, which excludes lakes, ponds, glaciers > 1 km^{2} (0.386 sq mi or 247 acres) and river estuaries.

Le Mesnil-Eudes (French pronunciation: [lə menil ød]) is a commune in the Calvados department in the Normandy region in northwestern France.

== Population ==
Historical population
Year	Pop.	±% p.a.
1968	226	—
1975	228	+0.13%
1982	245	+1.03%
1990	288	+2.04%
1999	286	−0.08%
2007	327	+1.69%
2012	286	−2.64%
2017	258	−2.04%
2023	252	−0.39%
Source: INSEE

== See also ==
- Communes of the Calvados department
