= La Houblonnière =

- Commune
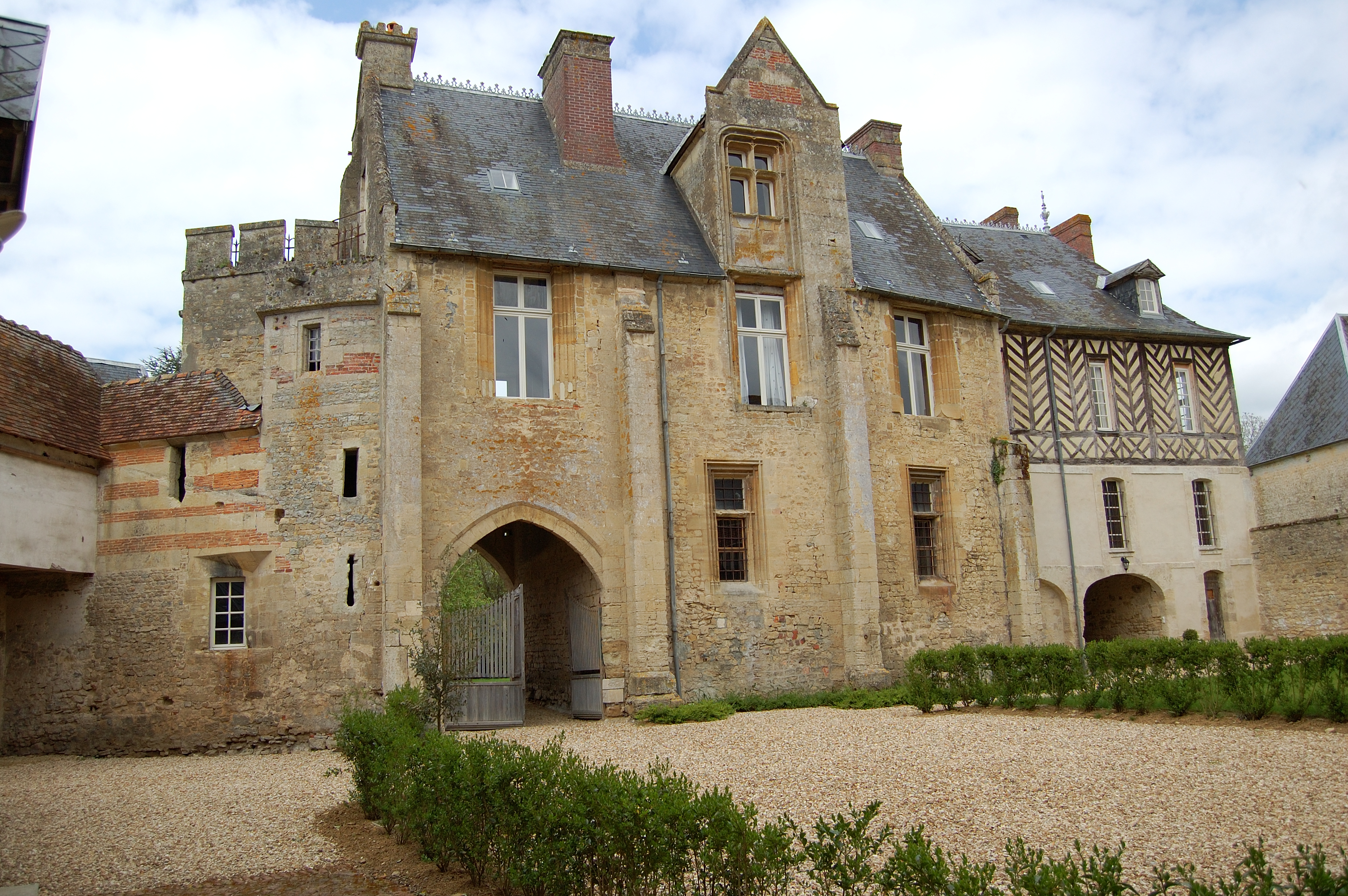
- Chateau
- Location of La Houblonnière
- Location within France Location within Normandy
- Coordinates: 49°07′32″N 0°06′20″E
- Country: France
- Region: Normandy
- Department: Calvados
- Arrondissement: Lisieux
- Canton: Mézidon Vallée d'Auge
- Intercommunality: CA Lisieux Normandie

Government
  - Mayor (2023–2026): Eric Rihouey
- Area^{1}: 7.1 km^{2} (2.7 sq mi)
- Elevation: 80 m (260 ft)
- Highest elevation: 163 m (535 ft)
- Lowest elevation: 35 m (115 ft)
- Population (2023): 324
  - Density: 46/km^{2} (120/sq mi)
- Time zone: UTC+01:00 (CET)
  - Summer (DST): UTC+02:00 (CEST)
- INSEE/Postal code: 14337 /14340
- ^{1} French Land Register data, which excludes lakes, ponds, glaciers > 1 km^{2} (0.386 sq mi or 247 acres) and river estuaries.

La Houblonnière (French pronunciation: [la ublɔnjɛʁ]) is a commune in the Calvados department in the Normandy region in northwestern France.

== Population ==
Historical population
Year	Pop.	±% p.a.
1968	141	—
1975	144	+0.30%
1982	155	+1.06%
1990	211	+3.93%
1999	234	+1.16%
2007	308	+3.49%
2012	335	+1.69%
2017	330	−0.30%
2023	324	−0.31%
Source: INSEE

== See also ==
- Communes of the Calvados department
