= Prêtreville =

- Commune
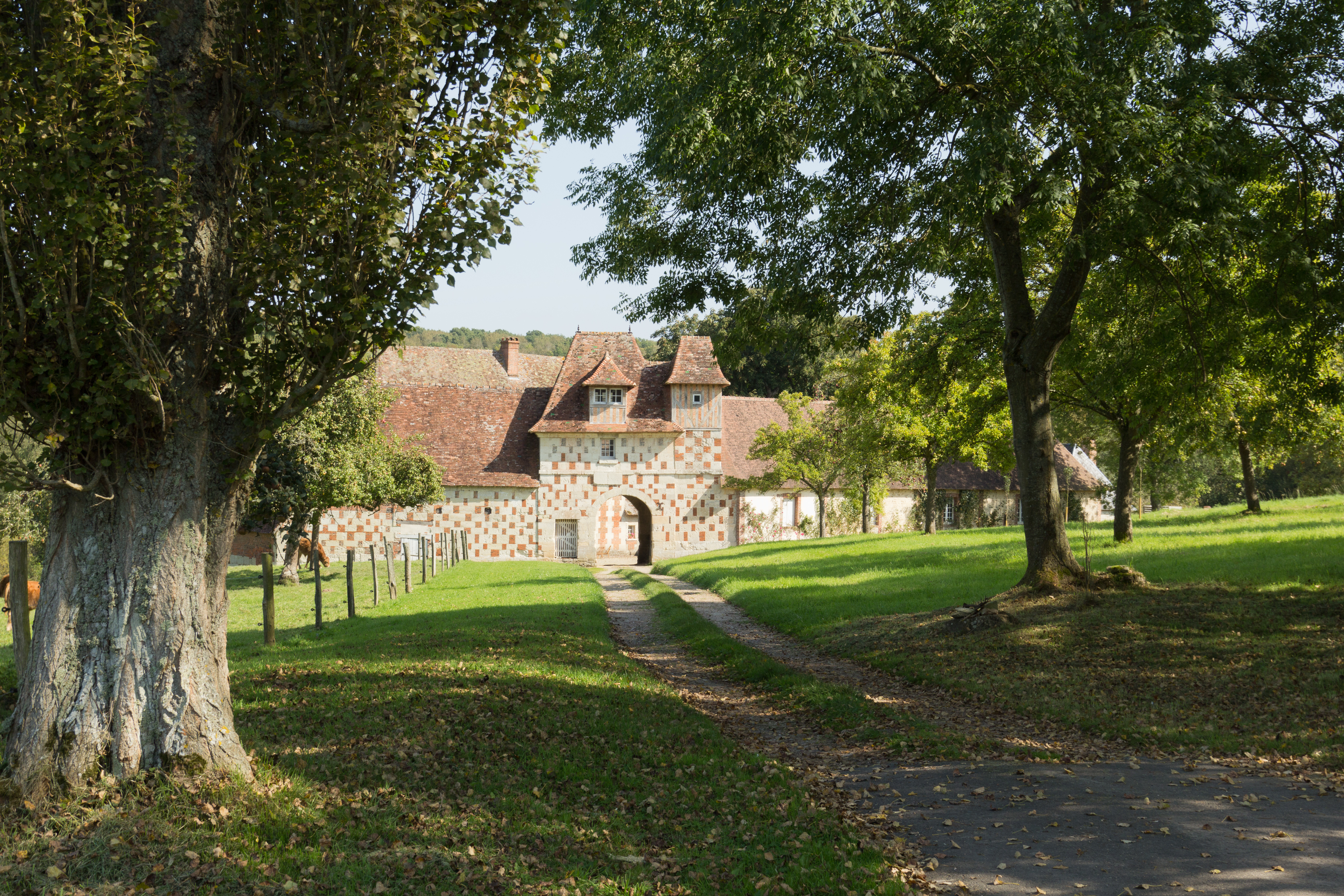
- The entrance to Querville Manor
- Location of Prêtreville
- Location within France Location within Normandy
- Coordinates: 49°04′33″N 0°15′03″E
- Country: France
- Region: Normandy
- Department: Calvados
- Arrondissement: Lisieux
- Canton: Mézidon Vallée d'Auge
- Intercommunality: CA Lisieux Normandie

Government
  - Mayor (2020–2026): Brigitte Hamelin
- Area^{1}: 11.23 km^{2} (4.34 sq mi)
- Elevation: 70 m (230 ft)
- Highest elevation: 162 m (531 ft)
- Lowest elevation: 62 m (203 ft)
- Population (2023): 391
  - Density: 34.8/km^{2} (90.2/sq mi)
- Time zone: UTC+01:00 (CET)
  - Summer (DST): UTC+02:00 (CEST)
- INSEE/Postal code: 14522 /14140
- ^{1} French Land Register data, which excludes lakes, ponds, glaciers > 1 km^{2} (0.386 sq mi or 247 acres) and river estuaries.

Prêtreville (French pronunciation: [pʁɛtʁəvil]) is a commune in the Calvados department in the Normandy region in northwestern France.

== Population ==
Historical population
Year	Pop.	±% p.a.
1968	295	—
1975	229	−3.55%
1982	285	+3.17%
1990	328	+1.77%
1999	334	+0.20%
2007	412	+2.66%
2012	442	+1.42%
2017	399	−2.03%
2023	391	−0.34%
Source: INSEE

== See also ==
- Communes of the Calvados department
