= Le Pré-d'Auge =

- Commune
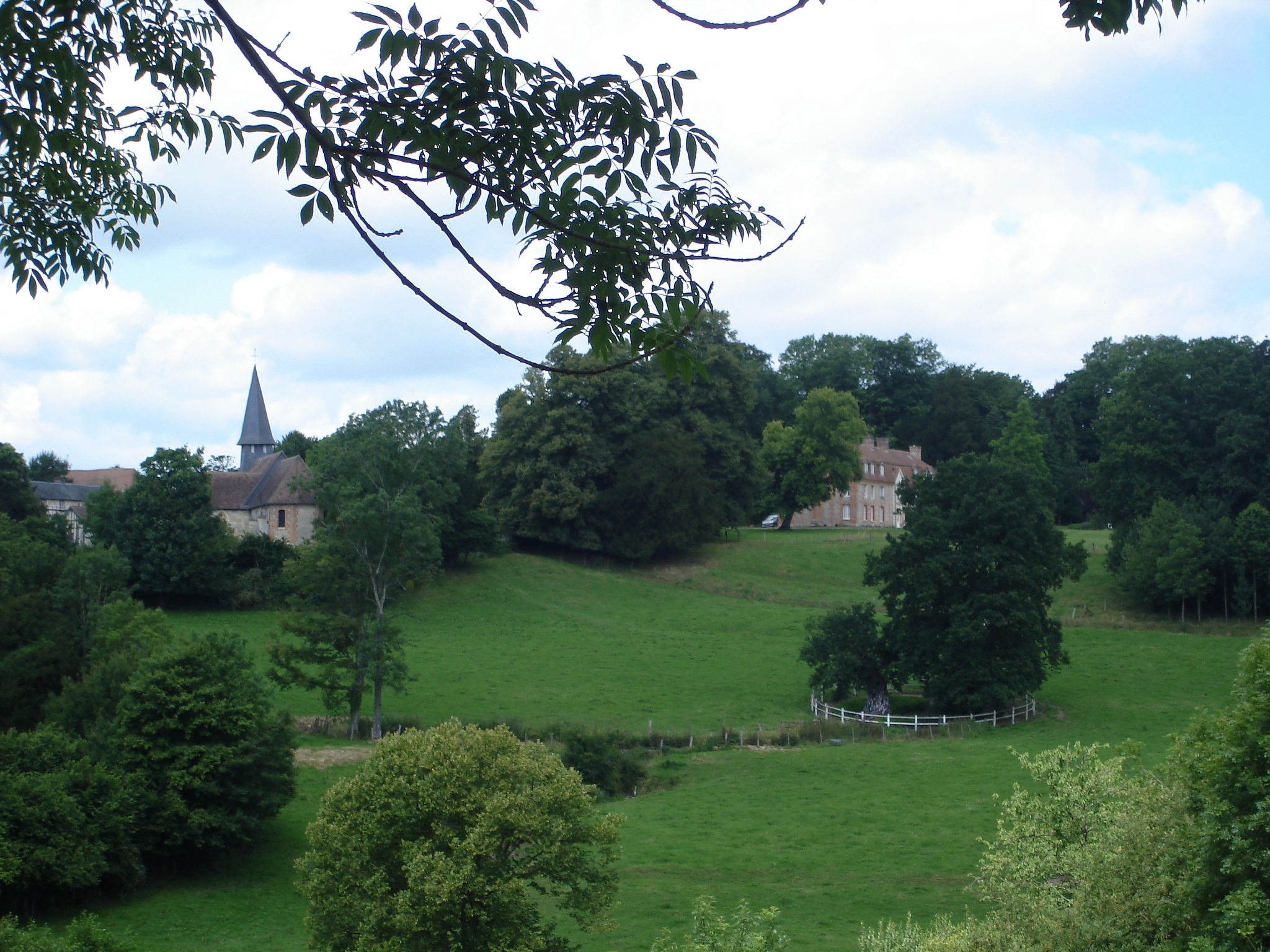
- The church and chateau in Le Pré-d'Auge
- Location of Le Pré-d'Auge
- Location within France Location within Normandy
- Coordinates: 49°09′20″N 0°08′50″E
- Country: France
- Region: Normandy
- Department: Calvados
- Arrondissement: Lisieux
- Canton: Mézidon Vallée d'Auge
- Intercommunality: CA Lisieux Normandie

Government
  - Mayor (2020–2026): Denis Pouteau
- Area^{1}: 10.72 km^{2} (4.14 sq mi)
- Elevation: 160 m (520 ft)
- Highest elevation: 178 m (584 ft)
- Lowest elevation: 72 m (236 ft)
- Population (2023): 841
  - Density: 78.5/km^{2} (203/sq mi)
- Time zone: UTC+01:00 (CET)
  - Summer (DST): UTC+02:00 (CEST)
- INSEE/Postal code: 14520 /14340
- ^{1} French Land Register data, which excludes lakes, ponds, glaciers > 1 km^{2} (0.386 sq mi or 247 acres) and river estuaries.

Le Pré-d'Auge (French pronunciation: [lə pʁe doʒ], literally The Meadow of Auge) is a commune in the Calvados department in the Normandy region in northwestern France.

== Population ==
Historical population
Year	Pop.	±% p.a.
1968	508	—
1975	551	+1.17%
1982	607	+1.39%
1990	654	+0.94%
1999	745	+1.46%
2007	841	+1.53%
2012	844	+0.07%
2017	887	+1.00%
2023	841	−0.88%
Source: INSEE

== See also ==
- Communes of the Calvados department
