= Beaufour-Druval =

- Commune
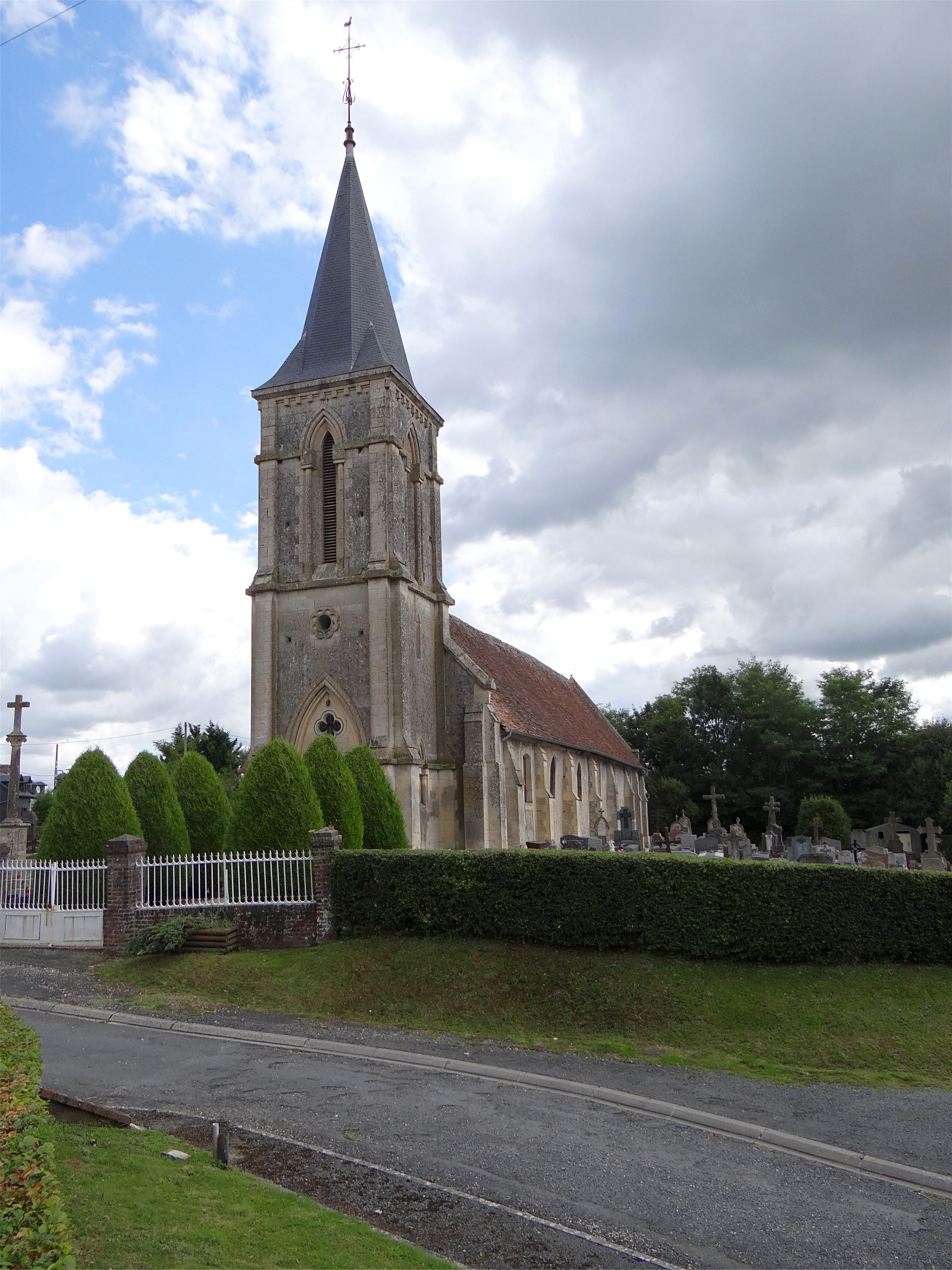
- The Church of Notre-Dame-de-Druval

- Coat of arms
- Location of Beaufour-Druval
- Location within France Location within Normandy
- Coordinates: 49°12′52″N 0°01′36″E
- Country: France
- Region: Normandy
- Department: Calvados
- Arrondissement: Lisieux
- Canton: Mézidon Vallée d'Auge
- Intercommunality: CC Normandie-Cabourg-Pays d'Auge

Government
  - Mayor (2020–2026): Jean-Pierre Mercher
- Area^{1}: 11.34 km^{2} (4.38 sq mi)
- Elevation: 130 m (430 ft)
- Highest elevation: 151 m (495 ft)
- Lowest elevation: 30 m (98 ft)
- Population (2023): 453
  - Density: 39.9/km^{2} (103/sq mi)
- Time zone: UTC+01:00 (CET)
  - Summer (DST): UTC+02:00 (CEST)
- INSEE/Postal code: 14231 /14340
- ^{1} French Land Register data, which excludes lakes, ponds, glaciers > 1 km^{2} (0.386 sq mi or 247 acres) and river estuaries.

Beaufour-Druval (French pronunciation: [bofuʁ dʁyval]) is a commune in the Calvados department in the Normandy region of north-western France.

The inhabitants of the commune are known as Beaufourquais-Druvalais or Beaufourquaises-Druvalaises.

== Geography ==
Beaufour-Druval is located some 25 km east by north-east of Caen and 12 km south-east of Cabourg. Access to the commune is by the D287 road from Angerville in the north-west, the D276 from Cresseveuille in the north which continues south-east to Auvillars, and the D146 from Beuvron-en-Auge in the south-west which continues to join the D45 in the north-east. The D85 from Saint-Léger-Dubosq in the west to Rumesnil in the south forms part of the south-western border of the commune. Apart from the village, there are the hamlets of Saint-Aubin-Lebizay and La Ruelle. The commune is entirely farmland.

The Ruisseau de Druval forms the south-eastern border of the commune as it flows south-west to join the Doigt west of Rumesnil. Several unnamed tributaries rise in the commune and flow south-east to join the Ruisseau de Druval.

== Toponymy ==
Beaufour was attested in its Romanesque form Belfou in 1040 and 1066 then badly Latinized to Bellafagus in 1195.

The name has no relationship with "un four" as shown in the old forms but comes from the beech tree, which was formerly called fou in the west.

Druval comes from Drudo plus the Latin suffix vallem.

Beaufour appears as Beaufou on the 1750 Cassini Map and the same on the 1790 version.

Druval appears as Druval on the 1750 Cassini Map and the same on the 1790 version.

== History ==
The commune was created in 1972 from the merger of Beaufour, Druval, and Saint-Aubin-Lebizay.

The commune is probably the birthplace of William de Beaufeu, Bishop of Thetford from 1086 to 1091. It is also the probable birthplace of Richard de Beaufou, bishop of Avranches from 1134 to 1142 who is probably related to William de Beaufou.

== Administration ==
List of Successive Mayors

From	To	Name
2001	2008	Gérard Desvoye
2008	2026	Jean-Pierre Mercher

== Demography ==
Historical population

Year	Pop.	±% p.a.
1793	350	—
1821	252	−1.17%
1846	181	−1.32%
1872	137	−1.07%
1901	155	+0.43%
1926	125	−0.86%
1946	116	−0.37%
1954	96	−2.34%
1962	131	+3.96%

Year	Pop.	±% p.a.
1968	105	−3.62%
1975	239	+12.47%
1982	293	+2.95%
1990	323	+1.23%
1999	362	+1.27%
2007	424	+2.00%
2012	425	+0.05%
2017	444	+0.88%
2023	453	+0.34%

Source: EHESS and INSEE

== Culture and heritage ==
=== Civil heritage ===
The commune has a number of buildings and sites that are registered as historical monuments:

- A Chateau (19th century)

=== Religious heritage ===
The Church of Notre-Dame-de-Druval (13th century) is registered as an historical monument. It contains a large number of items that are registered as historical objects.

== See also ==
- Communes of the Calvados department
