= Basseneville =

- Commune
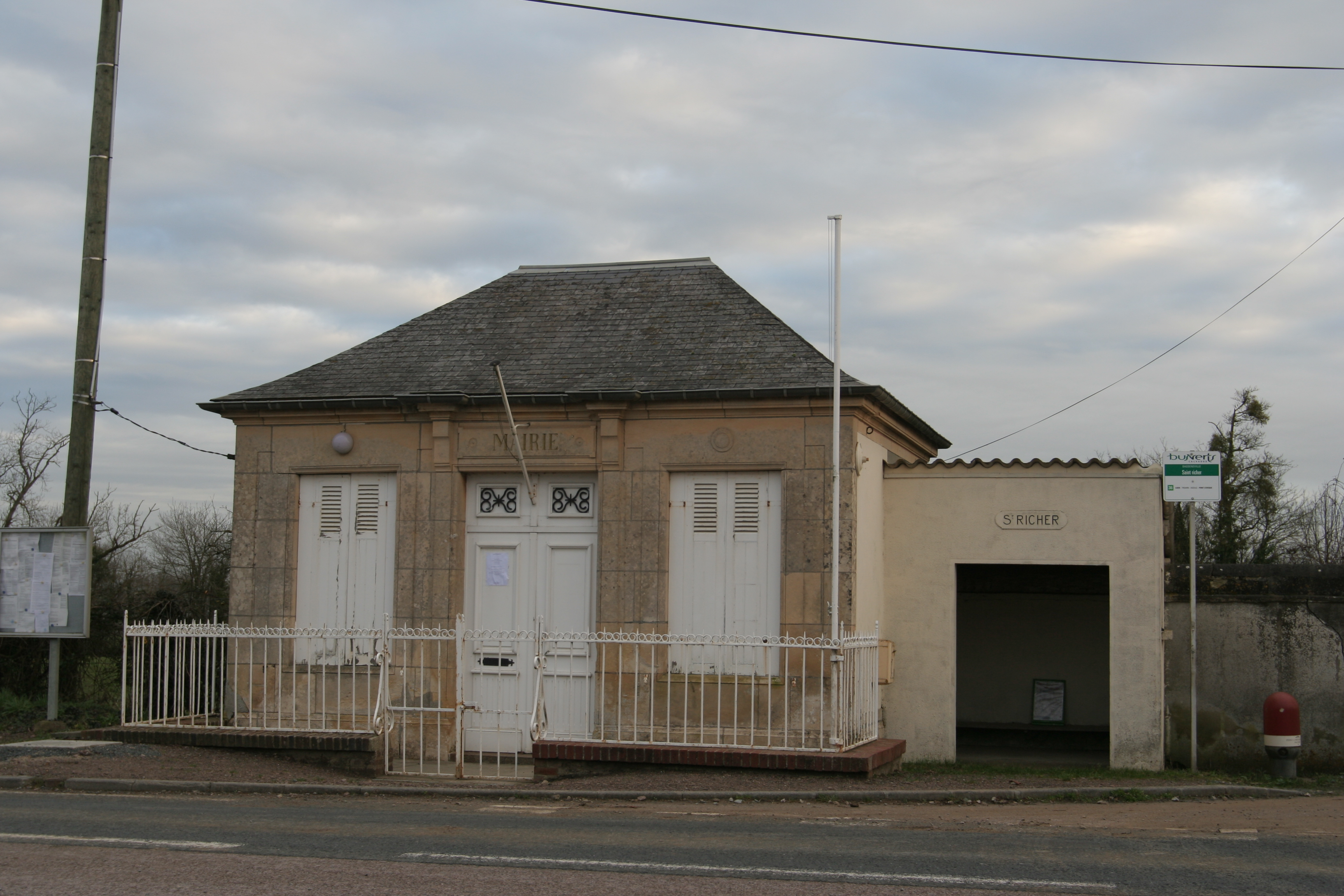
- Town hall
- Location of Basseneville
- Location within France Location within Normandy
- Coordinates: 49°12′01″N 0°07′42″W
- Country: France
- Region: Normandy
- Department: Calvados
- Arrondissement: Lisieux
- Canton: Cabourg
- Intercommunality: CC Normandie-Cabourg-Pays d'Auge

Government
  - Mayor (2020–2026): Patrice Germain
- Area^{1}: 10.59 km^{2} (4.09 sq mi)
- Elevation: 6 m (20 ft)
- Highest elevation: 45 m (148 ft)
- Lowest elevation: 2 m (6.6 ft)
- Population (2023): 253
  - Density: 23.9/km^{2} (61.9/sq mi)
- Time zone: UTC+01:00 (CET)
  - Summer (DST): UTC+02:00 (CEST)
- INSEE/Postal code: 14045 /14670
- ^{1} French Land Register data, which excludes lakes, ponds, glaciers > 1 km^{2} (0.386 sq mi or 247 acres) and river estuaries.

Basseneville is a commune in the Calvados department in the Normandy region of north-western France.

The inhabitants of the commune are known as Bassenevillais or Bassenevillaises.

== Geography ==
Basseneville is located in the Pays d'Auge some 12 km east of Caen and 8 km south-east of Cabourg. Access to the commune is by the D675 road from Goustranville in the east which passes through the south of the commune continuing south-west to Saint-Samson. The D224A also comes from Saint-Samson and passes through the commune continuing north-east to join the D224 just north-east of the commune. The A13 autoroute passes through the commune from east to west but has no exit - the nearest exit is Exit 29 Dozulé to the east of the commune which has no direct access the commune and Exit 30/31 to the south-west which connects to the D675. Apart from the village there are the hamlets of L'Église, Les Marettes, Saint-Richer, and La Chollerie. The commune is entirely farmland.

The Dives river forms the north-western border of the commune as it flows north-east to join the sea at Cabourg. The Grand Canal forms the south-eastern border of the commune.

== History ==
Basseneville appears as Bafneville on the 1750 Cassini Map and as Bosneville on the 1790 version.

A railway station on the Caen to Dozulé-Putot line existed in the commune from 1881 to 1938. The line that passed through the commune was finally closed in 1943.

== Administration ==
List of Successive Mayors

From	To	Name	Party	Position
1983	2008	André Vardon		
2008	2014	Jean-François Wantz		Retired
2014	2026	Patrice Germain		Retired

== Demography ==
Historical population

Year	Pop.	±% p.a.
1793	334	—
1821	327	−0.08%
1846	409	+0.90%
1872	323	−0.90%
1901	252	−0.85%
1926	205	−0.82%
1946	188	−0.43%
1962	189	+0.03%
1968	195	+0.52%

Year	Pop.	±% p.a.
1975	197	+0.15%
1982	223	+1.79%
1990	234	+0.60%
1999	263	+1.31%
2007	262	−0.05%
2012	258	−0.31%
2017	257	−0.08%
2023	253	−0.26%

Source: EHESS and INSEE

== Culture and heritage ==
=== Religious heritage ===
The Chapel of Saint Richer contains several items that are registered as historical objects:

- A Chalice with Paten (18th century)
- A Trunk (17th century)
- A Painting with frame: Crucifixion (17th century)

The Parish Church of Notre-Dame also contains several items that are registered as historical objects:

- A Tabernacle (17th century)
- A Painting: The Holy Family (18th century)
- A Painting with frame: Holy Family (18th century)
- An Altar, Retable, and 2 doors (1719)
- A Lectern (1721)

== Notable people linked to the commune ==
- Jean-Victor Durand-Duquesnay (1785 at Basseneville - 1862), Normandy botanist
- Pierre (François-Amand) Bazin (1796 at Basseneville - 1865)

== See also ==
- Communes of the Calvados department
