= Cricqueville =

Cricqueville may refer to:

- Cricqueville-en-Auge
- Cricqueville-en-Bessin
