= Petiville =

Petiville is the name of several communes in France:

- Petiville, Calvados
- Petiville, Seine-Maritime
