= Auberville =

- Commune
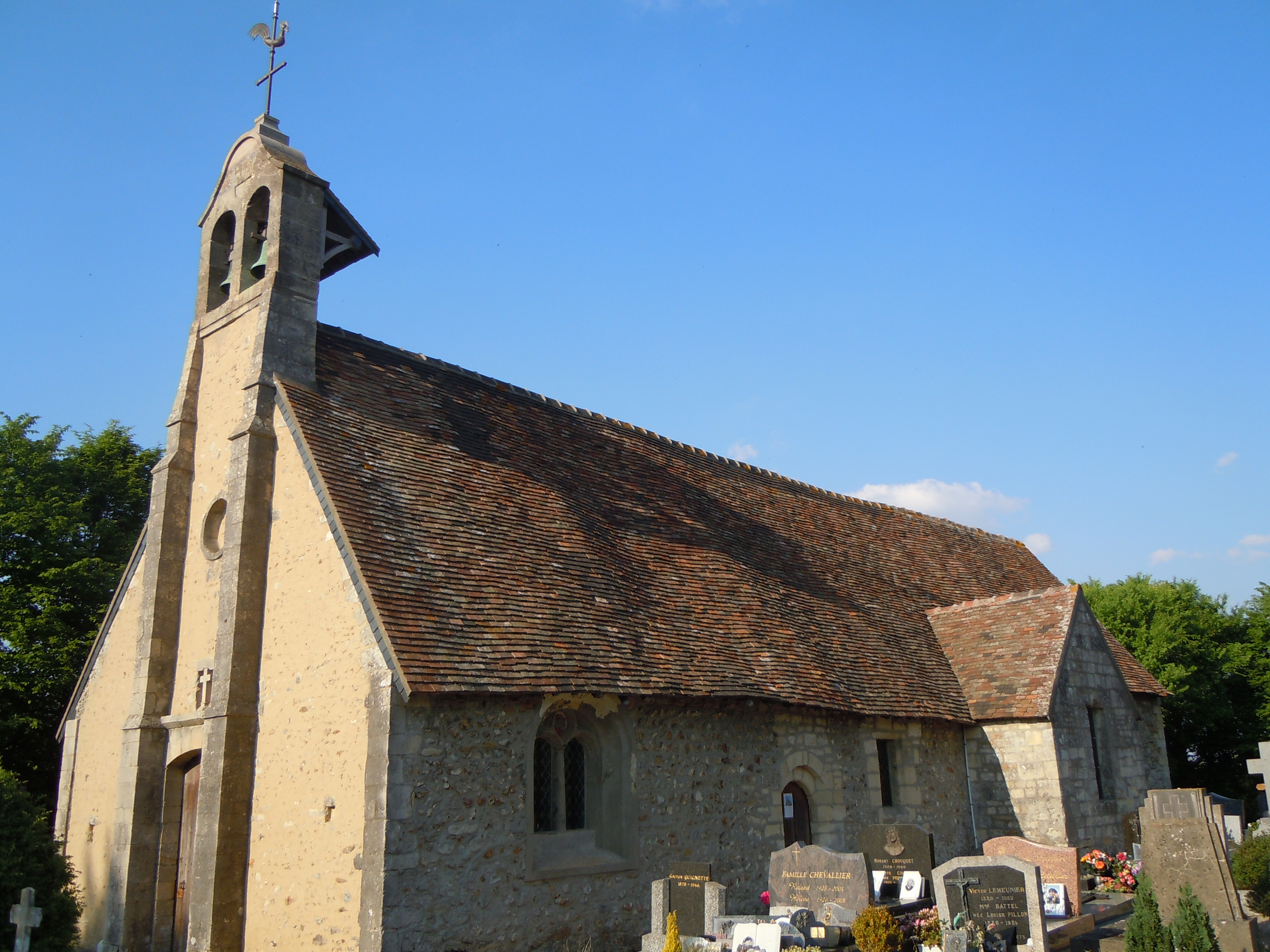
- The church in Auberville
- Location of Auberville
- Location within France Location within Normandy
- Coordinates: 49°18′25″N 0°01′41″W
- Country: France
- Region: Normandy
- Department: Calvados
- Arrondissement: Lisieux
- Canton: Cabourg
- Intercommunality: CC Normandie-Cabourg-Pays Auge

Government
  - Mayor (2020–2026): Bertrand Chirot
- Area^{1}: 2.62 km^{2} (1.01 sq mi)
- Elevation: 110 m (360 ft)
- Highest elevation: 131 m (430 ft)
- Lowest elevation: 5 m (16 ft)
- Population (2023): 609
  - Density: 232/km^{2} (602/sq mi)
- Time zone: UTC+01:00 (CET)
  - Summer (DST): UTC+02:00 (CEST)
- INSEE/Postal code: 14024 /14640
- ^{1} French Land Register data, which excludes lakes, ponds, glaciers > 1 km^{2} (0.386 sq mi or 247 acres) and river estuaries.

Auberville (French pronunciation: [obɛʁvil]) is a commune in the Calvados department in the Normandy region of north-western France.

== Geography ==
Auberville is located on the northern Normandy coast some 8 km east by north-east of Cabourg and 13 km south-west of Deauville. Access to the commune is by road D513 from Houlgate in the west which passes through the village and continues north-east to Villers-sur-Mer. The D163 branches off the D513 in the village and goes south to Branville. Apart from the village there are the hamlets of Les Genets, Les Bruyeres, and Le Manoir. The north of the commune is forested along the coast with slopes down to the beach while the rest of the commune is farmland.

== Toponymy ==
The name was attested in the form Osbertivilla in 1082. It came from the Germanic anthroponym Osbert or alternatively from the Scandinavian Osbern and the old French ville (from the Latin villa) in its original sense of "rural domain".

== History ==
Archaeological excavations have found Merovingian tombs.

== Administration ==
List of Successive Mayors

From	To	Name	Party	Position
2001	2008	William Lemarchand		
2008	2020	Antoine Grieu		Foreman
2020	2026	Bertrand Chirot		

== Demography ==
The inhabitants of the commune are known as Aubervillais or Aubervillaises in French.

Historical population

Year	Pop.	±% p.a.
1793	265	—
1821	219	−0.68%
1846	199	−0.38%
1872	153	−1.01%
1901	198	+0.89%
1926	171	−0.58%
1946	116	−1.92%
1962	124	+0.42%
1968	119	−0.68%

Year	Pop.	±% p.a.
1975	154	+3.75%
1982	137	−1.66%
1990	155	+1.56%
1999	213	+3.59%
2007	452	+9.86%
2012	448	−0.18%
2017	574	+5.08%
2023	609	+0.99%

Source: EHESS and INSEE

== Sites and monuments ==
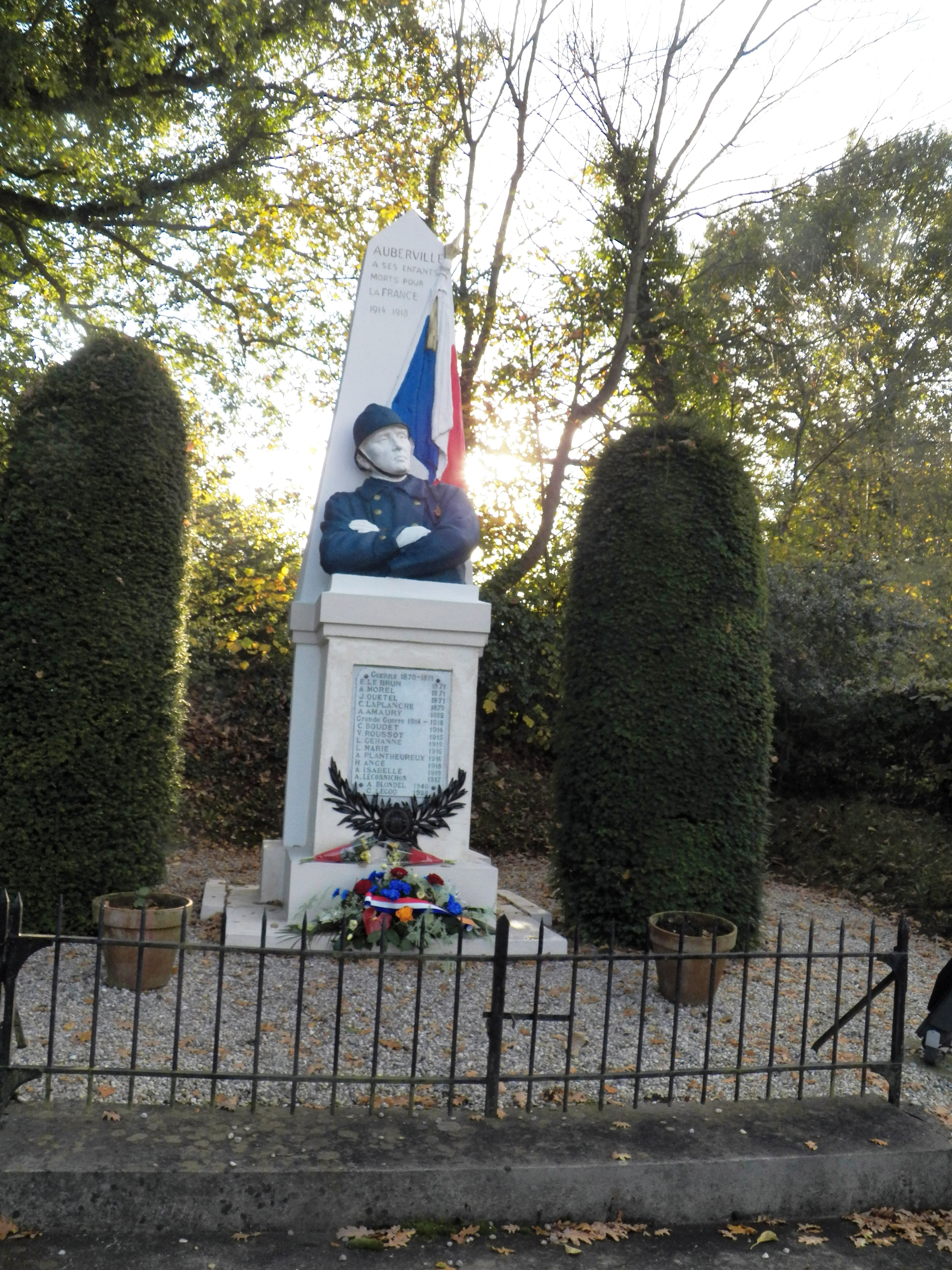
The War Memorial.

- The Church of Sainte-Barbe, from the 13th century with a bell-gable.
- Falaises des Vaches Noires (the site of Chaos).
- The War memorial at Auberville commemorates the victims of the Franco-Prussian War of 1870, the First World War, and the Second World War.

== Notable people linked to the commune ==
- Paul Ernest Dupont (1816-1891), painter, he stayed at Villers and came to paint at Auberville
- Pierre Ucciani (1851-1939), Corsican painter, he stayed at Cabourg and at Villers and came to paint at Auberville
- Julien Turbiau (1876-1934), doctor and amateur painter, he stayed at Villers and came to paint at Auberville
- Marie-Renée Ucciani, (1883-1963), painter and sculptor, she stayed at Villers and came to paint at Auberville
- Claude Lelouch (born in 1937) director, producer, actor, screenwriter, he had a second home at Auberville

== See also ==
- Communes of the Calvados department
