= Angerville, Calvados =

Angerville
- Commune
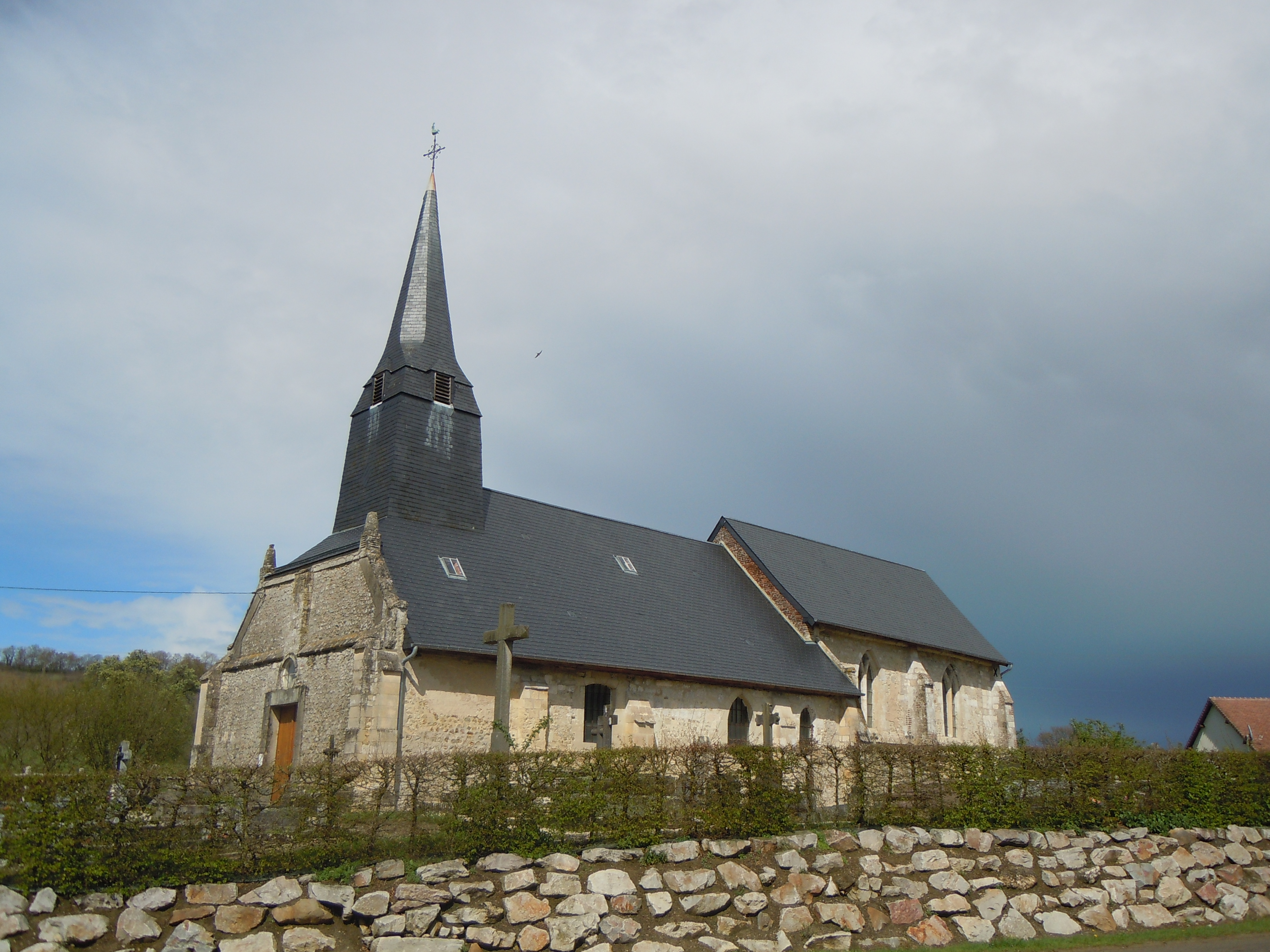
- The church in Angerville
- Location of Angerville
- Location within France Location within Normandy
- Coordinates: 49°14′38″N 0°01′54″W
- Country: France
- Region: Normandy
- Department: Calvados
- Arrondissement: Lisieux
- Canton: Cabourg
- Intercommunality: Normandie-Cabourg-Pays d'Auge

Government
  - Mayor (2025–2026): Sébastien Malfilatre
- Area^{1}: 3.91 km^{2} (1.51 sq mi)
- Elevation: 50 m (160 ft)
- Highest elevation: 120 m (390 ft)
- Lowest elevation: 14 m (46 ft)
- Population (2023): 184
  - Density: 47.1/km^{2} (122/sq mi)
- Time zone: UTC+01:00 (CET)
  - Summer (DST): UTC+02:00 (CEST)
- INSEE/Postal code: 14012 /14430
- ^{1} French Land Register data, which excludes lakes, ponds, glaciers > 1 km^{2} (0.386 sq mi or 247 acres) and river estuaries.

Angerville (French pronunciation: [ɑ̃ʒɛʁvil]) is a commune in the Calvados department in the Normandy region of northwestern France.

== Geography ==
Angerville is located some 30 km east by north-east of Caen and 20 km west of Pont-l'Eveque on the A13 autoroute which passes through the commune south of the village but has no exit in the commune. The nearest exit is Exit 29 to the west of the commune. Access to the commune is by the D675 road which runs parallel to and south of the A13 autoroute from Dozulé to Danestal. The D287 runs north from the D675 through the commune to the D142 which passes through the north-west of the commune running from Dozule to Gonneville-sur-Mer. Access to the village is solely by the dead-end Chemin de l'Eglise which runs west off the D287.

The Ancre river runs from west to east through the south of the commune and is joined by several other streams. The Ruisseau de Caudimuche forms much of the eastern border.

== Administration ==
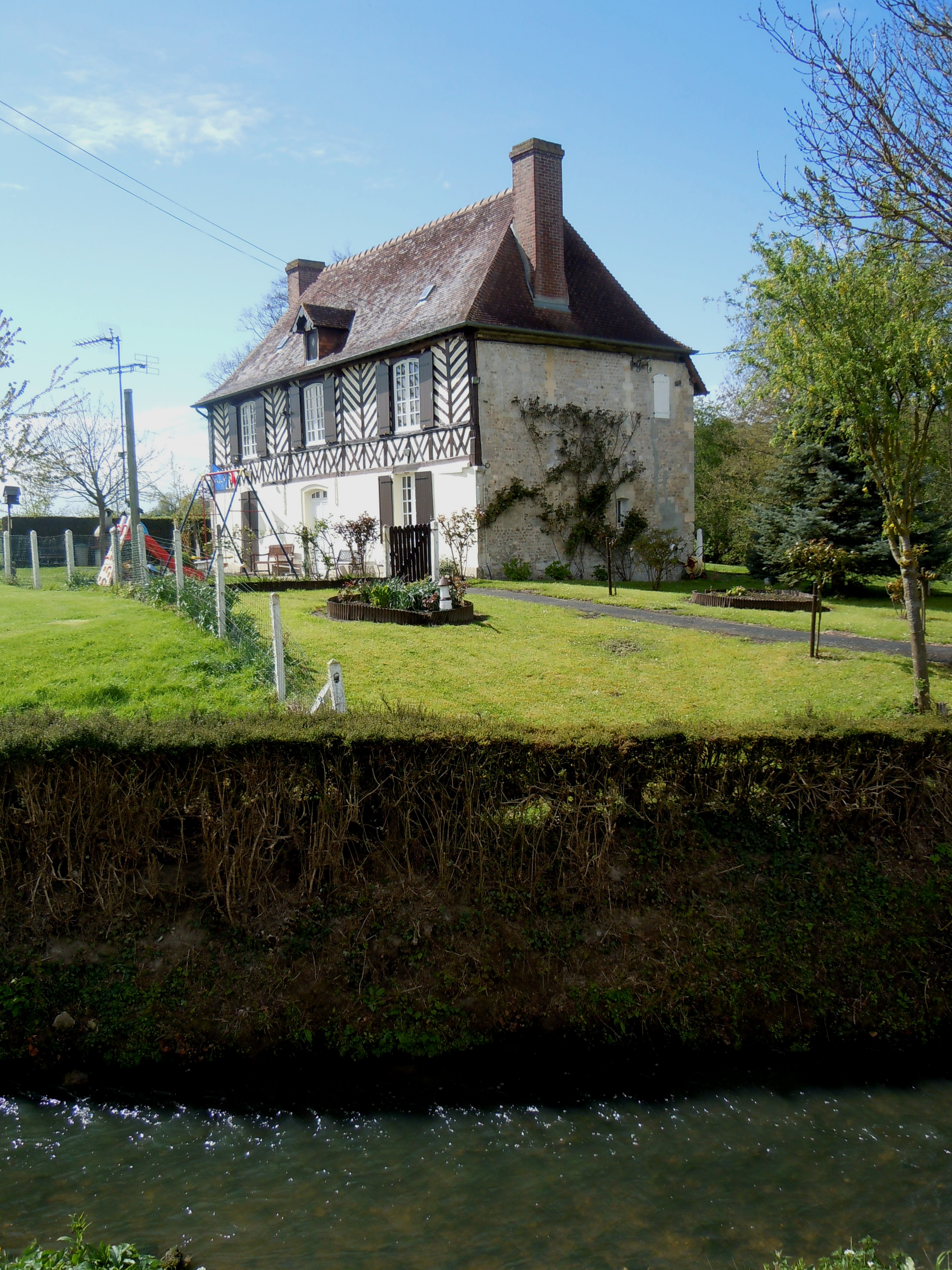
The Town hall next to the Ancre.

List of Successive Mayors

From	To	Name	Party	Position
1989	2008	Madeleine Lecomte		
2008	2020	Thierry de Vanssay	ind.	Retired marine officer & shopkeeper
2020	2025	Gérard Naimi		
2025	2026	Sébastien Malfilatre		

== Population ==
The inhabitants of the commune are known as Angervillais or Angervillaises in French.

Historical population
Year	Pop.	±% p.a.
1968	114	—
1975	102	−1.58%
1982	104	+0.28%
1990	115	+1.26%
1999	123	+0.75%
2007	125	+0.20%
2012	134	+1.40%
2017	172	+5.12%
2023	184	+1.13%
Source: INSEE

== Sites and monuments ==
- The Church of Saint-Leger is a small church from the 12th century not far from a trout fishing pond.

== See also ==
- Communes of the Calvados department
