= Douville-en-Auge =

- Commune
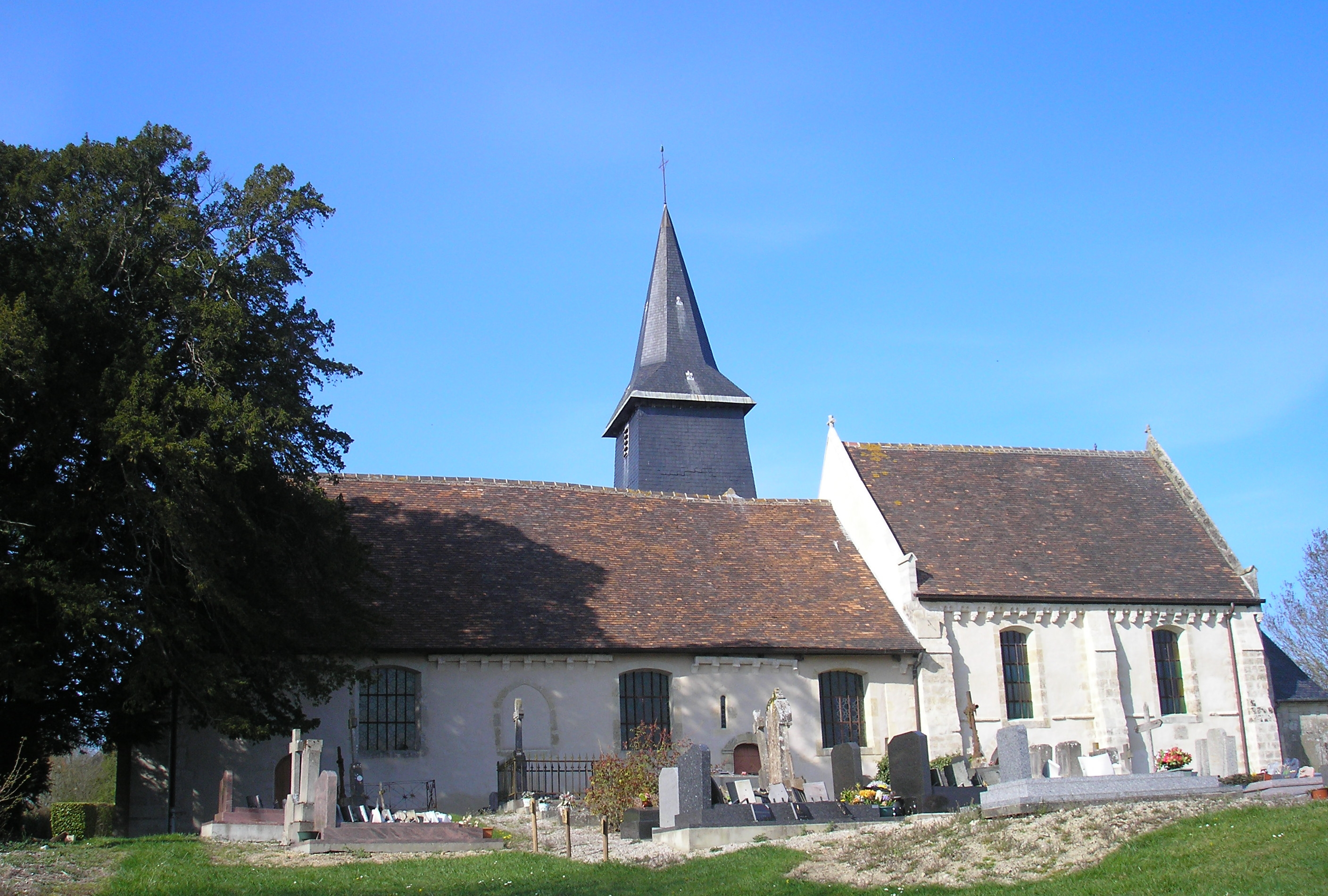
- The church in Douville-en-Auge
- Location of Douville-en-Auge
- Location within France Location within Normandy
- Coordinates: 49°15′43″N 0°01′20″W
- Country: France
- Region: Normandy
- Department: Calvados
- Arrondissement: Lisieux
- Canton: Cabourg
- Intercommunality: CC Normandie-Cabourg-Pays d'Auge

Government
  - Mayor (2020–2026): Béatrice Chauvin
- Area^{1}: 6.17 km^{2} (2.38 sq mi)
- Elevation: 50 m (160 ft)
- Highest elevation: 149 m (489 ft)
- Lowest elevation: 28 m (92 ft)
- Population (2023): 221
  - Density: 35.8/km^{2} (92.8/sq mi)
- Time zone: UTC+01:00 (CET)
  - Summer (DST): UTC+02:00 (CEST)
- INSEE/Postal code: 14227 /14430
- ^{1} French Land Register data, which excludes lakes, ponds, glaciers > 1 km^{2} (0.386 sq mi or 247 acres) and river estuaries.

Douville-en-Auge (French pronunciation: [duvil ɑ̃.n‿oʒ], literally Douville in Auge) is a commune in the Calvados department in the Normandy region in northwestern France.

== Population ==
Historical population
| Year | Pop. | ±% p.a. |
|---|---|---|
| 1968 | 169 | — |
| 1975 | 169 | +0.00% |
| 1982 | 178 | +0.74% |
| 1990 | 188 | +0.69% |
| 1999 | 197 | +0.52% |
| 2007 | 222 | +1.50% |
| 2012 | 224 | +0.18% |
| 2017 | 213 | −1.00% |
| 2023 | 221 | +0.62% |
Source: INSEE

== See also ==
- Communes of the Calvados department
