= Brucourt =

- Commune
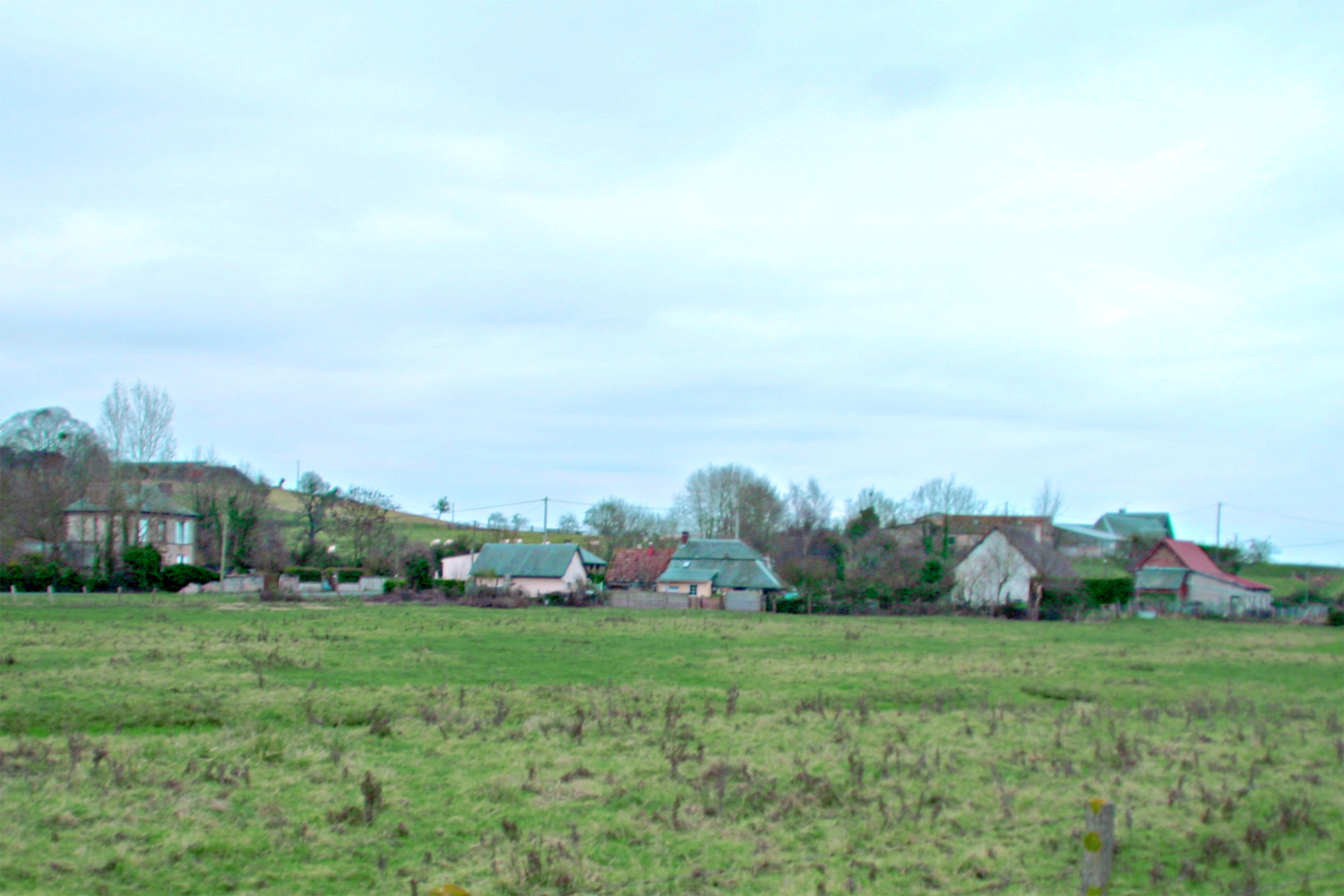
- A general view of Brucourt

- Coat of arms
- Location of Brucourt
- Location within France Location within Normandy
- Coordinates: 49°14′47″N 0°05′57″W
- Country: France
- Region: Normandy
- Department: Calvados
- Arrondissement: Lisieux
- Canton: Cabourg
- Intercommunality: CC Normandie-Cabourg-Pays d'Auge

Government
  - Mayor (2020–2026): Marie-Louise Besson
- Area^{1}: 6.6 km^{2} (2.5 sq mi)
- Elevation: 4 m (13 ft)
- Highest elevation: 105 m (344 ft)
- Lowest elevation: 2 m (6.6 ft)
- Population (2023): 129
  - Density: 20/km^{2} (51/sq mi)
- Time zone: UTC+01:00 (CET)
  - Summer (DST): UTC+02:00 (CEST)
- INSEE/Postal code: 14110 /14160
- ^{1} French Land Register data, which excludes lakes, ponds, glaciers > 1 km^{2} (0.386 sq mi or 247 acres) and river estuaries.

Brucourt (French pronunciation: [bʁykuʁ]) is a commune in the Calvados department in the Normandy region in northwestern France.

== Population ==
Historical population
Year	Pop.	±% p.a.
1968	114	—
1975	84	−4.27%
1982	107	+3.52%
1990	108	+0.12%
1999	120	+1.18%
2007	131	+1.10%
2012	128	−0.46%
2017	115	−2.12%
2023	129	+1.93%
Source: INSEE

== See also ==
- Communes of the Calvados department
