= Canton of Cabourg =

Coordinates: 49.29°N 0.12°W

Cabourg
- Canton
- Interactive map of Cabourg
- Country: France
- Region: Normandy
- Department: Calvados
- No. of communes: {{{nbcomm}}}

Government
  - Representatives (2021–2028): Emmanuel Porcq; Béatrice Guillaume
- Area: 221.67 km^{2} (85.59 sq mi)
- Population (2023): 30,404
  - Density: 137.16/km^{2} (355.24/sq mi)
- INSEE code: 14 04

The canton of Cabourg is an administrative division of the Calvados department, northwestern France. Its borders were modified at the French canton reorganisation which came into effect in March 2015. Its seat is in Cabourg.

== Composition ==
It consists of the following communes:

1. Amfreville
2. Angerville
3. Annebault
4. Auberville
5. Basseneville
6. Bavent
7. Bourgeauville
8. Branville
9. Bréville-les-Monts
10. Brucourt
11. Cabourg
12. Cresseveuille
13. Cricqueville-en-Auge
14. Danestal
15. Dives-sur-Mer
16. Douville-en-Auge
17. Dozulé
18. Gonneville-en-Auge
19. Gonneville-sur-Mer
20. Goustranville
21. Grangues
22. Hérouvillette
23. Heuland
24. Houlgate
25. Merville-Franceville-Plage
26. Périers-en-Auge
27. Petiville
28. Putot-en-Auge
29. Ranville
30. Saint-Jouin
31. Saint-Léger-Dubosq
32. Saint-Vaast-en-Auge
33. Sallenelles
34. Varaville

== Councillors ==
Election	Councillors	Party	Occupation
2015	Olivier Colin	DVD	Councillor of Houlgate
2015	Béatrice Guillaume	LR	Former councillor of Merville-Franceville-Plage

== Pictures of the canton ==
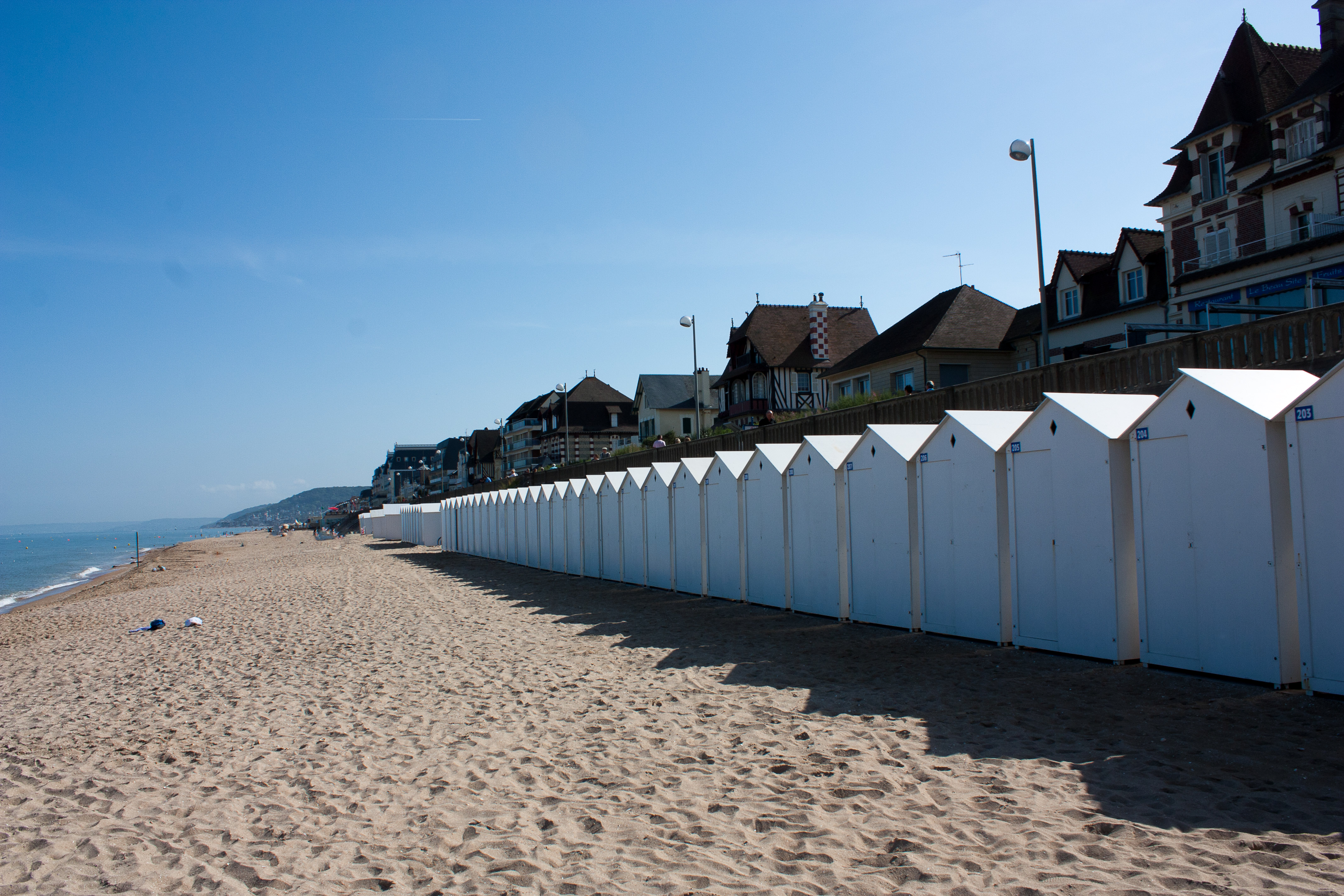
Cabourg Beach

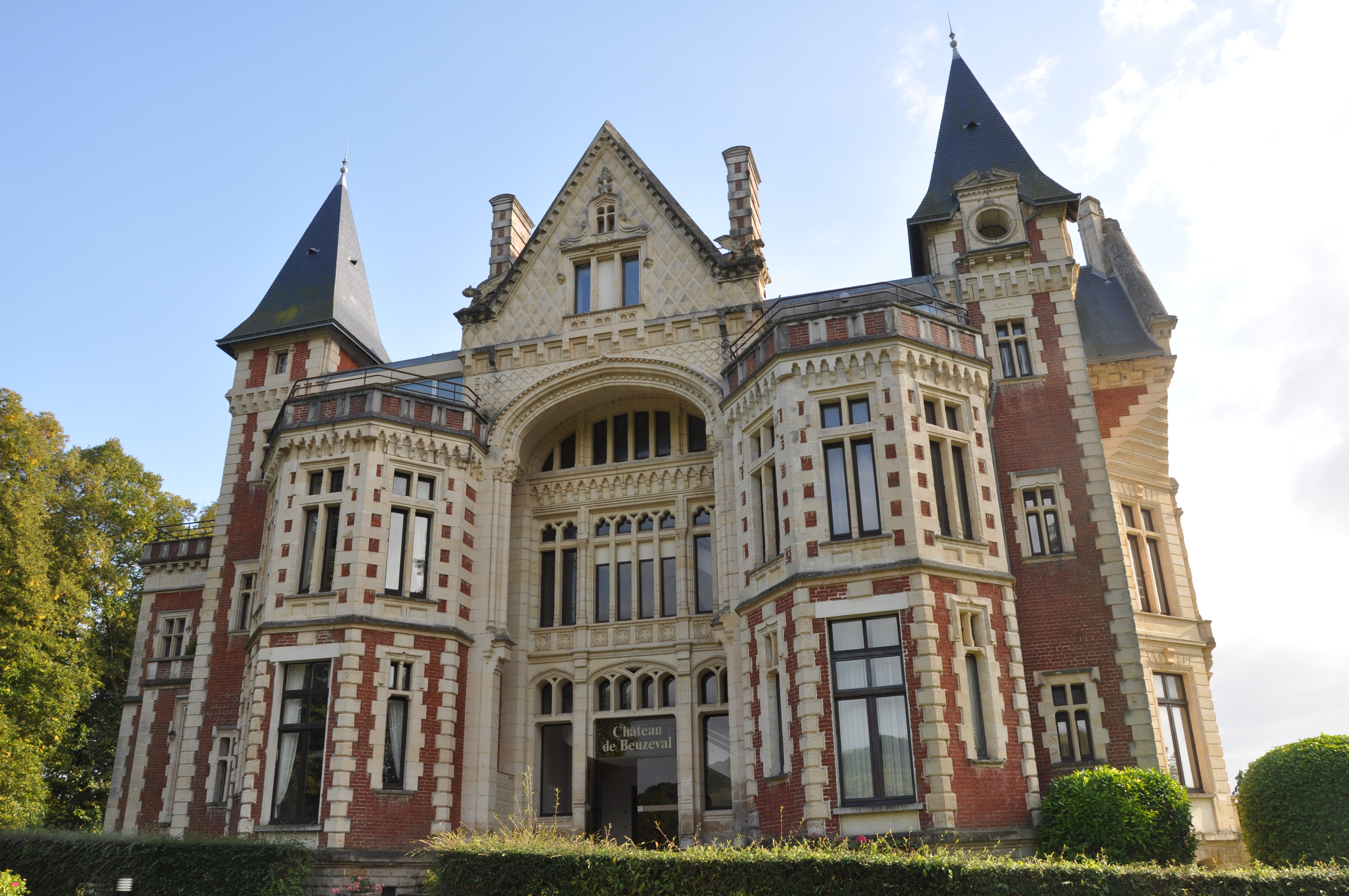
Castle of Beuzeval in Houlgate

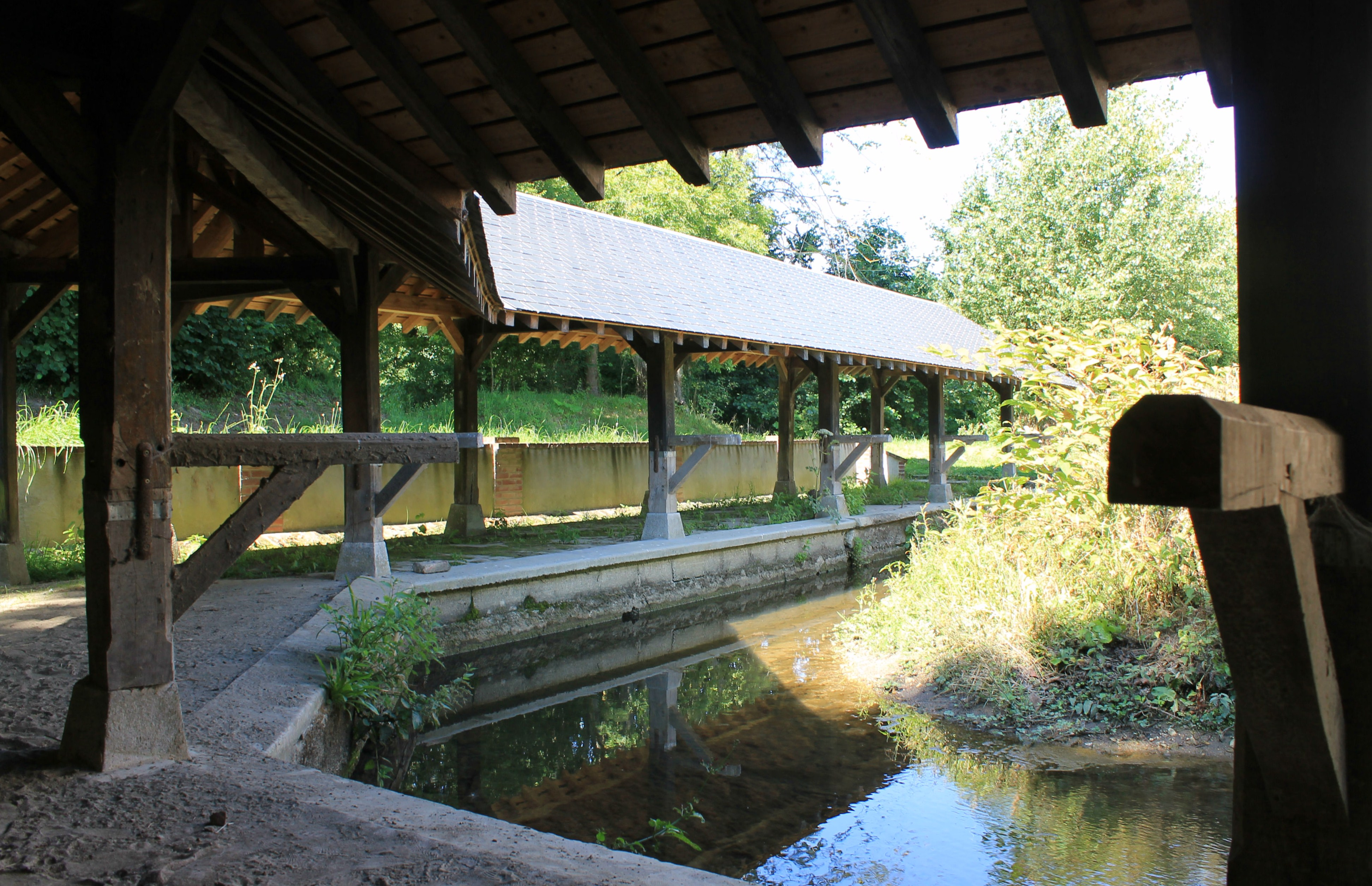
Former Wash-house in Dozulé
