= Putot-en-Auge =

- Commune
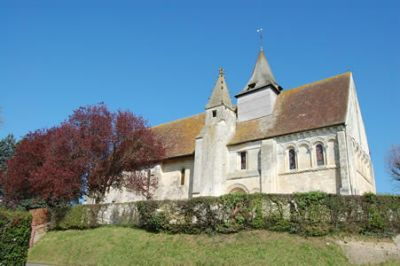
- The church in Putot-en-Auge
- Location of Putot-en-Auge
- Location within France Location within Normandy
- Coordinates: 49°13′06″N 0°04′02″W
- Country: France
- Region: Normandy
- Department: Calvados
- Arrondissement: Lisieux
- Canton: Cabourg
- Intercommunality: CC Normandie-Cabourg-Pays d'Auge

Government
  - Mayor (2020–2026): Alain Asmant
- Area^{1}: 6.58 km^{2} (2.54 sq mi)
- Elevation: 30 m (98 ft)
- Highest elevation: 139 m (456 ft)
- Lowest elevation: 3 m (9.8 ft)
- Population (2023): 307
  - Density: 46.7/km^{2} (121/sq mi)
- Time zone: UTC+01:00 (CET)
  - Summer (DST): UTC+02:00 (CEST)
- INSEE/Postal code: 14524 /14430
- ^{1} French Land Register data, which excludes lakes, ponds, glaciers > 1 km^{2} (0.386 sq mi or 247 acres) and river estuaries.

Putot-en-Auge (French pronunciation: [pyto ɑ̃.n‿oʒ], literally Putot in Auge) is a commune in the Calvados department in the Normandy region in northwestern France.

On the hill to the east of Putot a vicious battle was fought on 19 August 1944. The Allied casualties lie in the small churchyard of Putot-en-Auge.

The village features heavily in the book "13 - Lucky For Some" which is about the history of the 13th (Lancashire) Parachute Battalion. There are many then and now photographs as well as maps and diagrams of battles that took place in the region.

== Population ==
Historical population
| Year | Pop. | ±% p.a. |
|---|---|---|
| 1968 | 202 | — |
| 1975 | 304 | +6.01% |
| 1982 | 344 | +1.78% |
| 1990 | 352 | +0.29% |
| 1999 | 330 | −0.71% |
| 2007 | 290 | −1.60% |
| 2012 | 299 | +0.61% |
| 2017 | 296 | −0.20% |
| 2023 | 307 | +0.61% |
Source: INSEE

== See also ==
- Communes of the Calvados department
