= Communauté de communes Normandie-Cabourg-Pays d'Auge =

Intercommunal structure in Normandy, France

Normandie-Cabourg-Pays d'Auge
- Communauté de communes
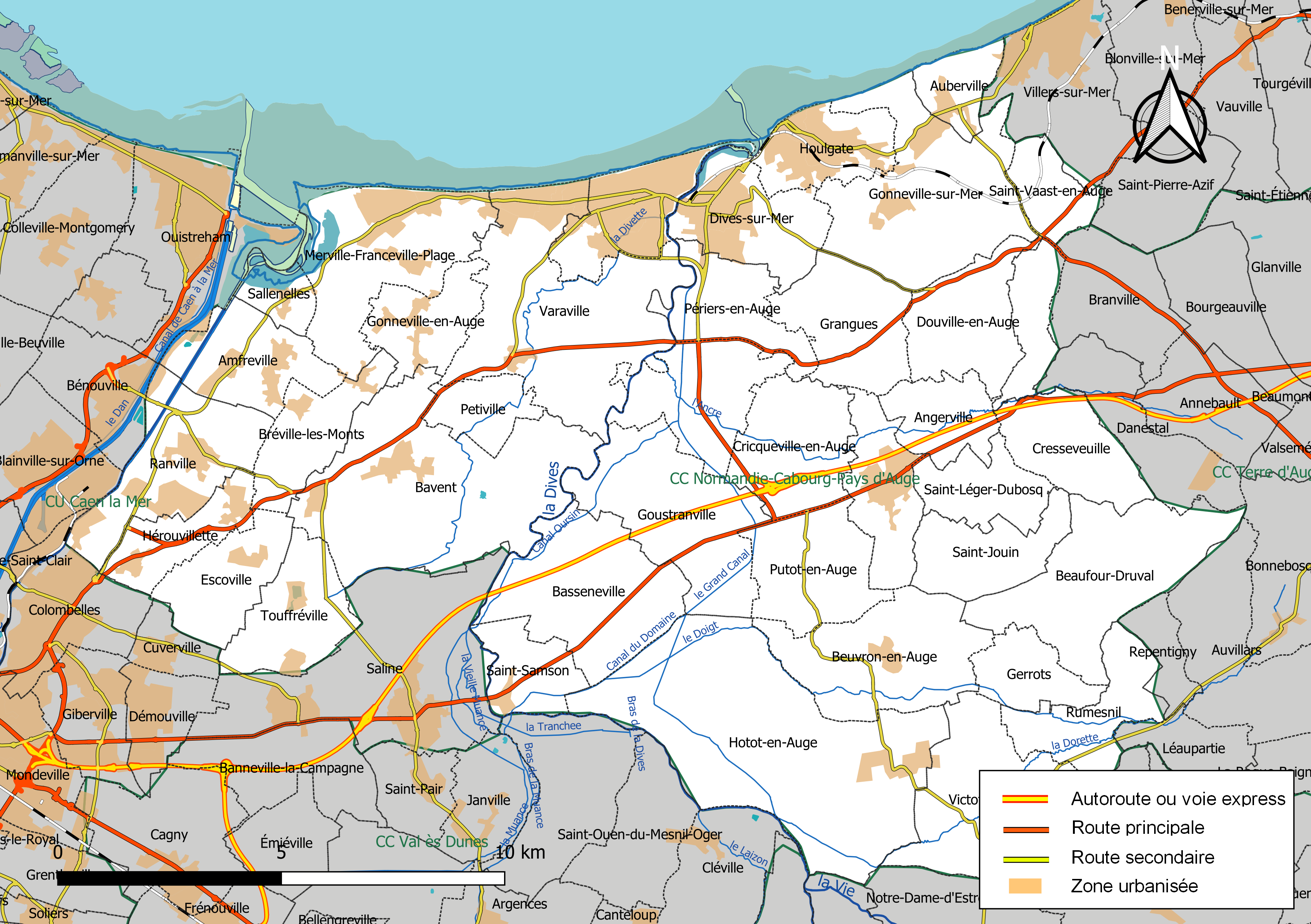
- Map of Normandie-Cabourg-Pays d'Auge
- Coordinates: 49°16′N 00°05′W
- Country: France
- Region: Normandy
- Department: Calvados
- No. of communes: {{{nbcomm}}}
- Established: 2016

Government
  - President: Olivier Paz
- Area: 276.4 km^{2} (106.7 sq mi)
- Population (2021): 31,397
  - Density: 113.6/km^{2} (294.2/sq mi)
- Website: www.normandiecabourgpaysdauge.fr

Normandie-Cabourg-Pays d'Auge is the intercommunal structure centered on the town of Dives-sur-Mer. It is located in the Calvados Department in the region of Normandy, northwestern France. It was created in 2016 and its seat is Dives-sur-Mer. Its area is 276.40 square kilometers. As of 2021 its population was 31,397 people with 5,174 people living in Dives-sur-Mer proper.

== History ==
Communauté de communes Normandie-Cabourg-Pays d'Auge was formed on 1 December 2016 after 3 intercommunal structures, Communauté de communes Cabalor, Communauté de communes CCED, and Communauté de communes Copadoz, merged. On January 1st, 2018, 6 other communes also joined Communauté de communes Normandie-Cabourg-Pays d'Auge.

== Composition ==
Communauté de communes Normandie-Cabourg-Pays d'Auge is made up of the following 38 communes:

1. Amfreville
2. Angerville
3. Auberville
4. Basseneville
5. Bavent
6. Beaufour-Druval
7. Beuvron-en-Auge
8. Bréville-les-Monts
9. Brucourt
10. Cabourg
11. Cresseveuille
12. Cricqueville-en-Auge
13. Dives-sur-Mer
14. Douville-en-Auge
15. Dozulé
16. Escoville
17. Gonneville-en-Auge
18. Gonneville-sur-Mer
19. Goustranville
20. Grangues
21. Hérouvillette
22. Heuland
23. Hotot-en-Auge
24. Houlgate
25. Merville-Franceville-Plage
26. Périers-en-Auge
27. Petiville
28. Putot-en-Auge
29. Ranville
30. Rumesnil
31. Saint-Jouin
32. Saint-Léger-Dubosq
33. Saint-Samson
34. Saint-Vaast-en-Auge
35. Sallenelles
36. Touffréville
37. Varaville
38. Victot-en-Auge
