= Bourgeauville =

- Commune
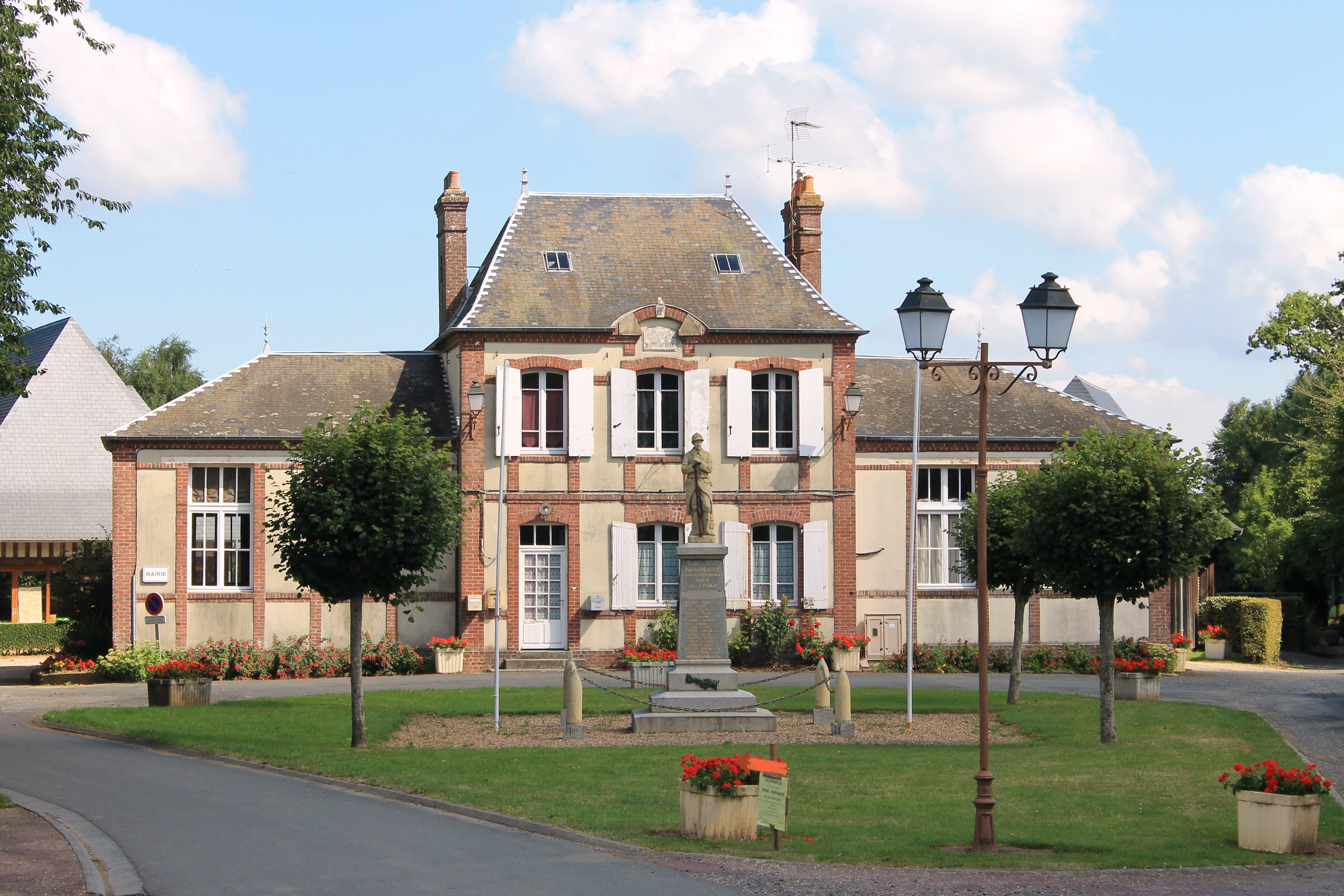
- The town hall in Bourgeauville

- Coat of arms
- Location of Bourgeauville
- Location within France Location within Normandy
- Coordinates: 49°16′28″N 0°03′20″E
- Country: France
- Region: Normandy
- Department: Calvados
- Arrondissement: Lisieux
- Canton: Cabourg
- Intercommunality: CC Terre d'Auge

Government
  - Mayor (2020–2026): Olivier Saintville
- Area^{1}: 6.15 km^{2} (2.37 sq mi)
- Elevation: 120 m (390 ft)
- Highest elevation: 148 m (486 ft)
- Lowest elevation: 68 m (223 ft)
- Population (2023): 104
  - Density: 16.9/km^{2} (43.8/sq mi)
- Time zone: UTC+01:00 (CET)
  - Summer (DST): UTC+02:00 (CEST)
- INSEE/Postal code: 14091 /14430
- ^{1} French Land Register data, which excludes lakes, ponds, glaciers > 1 km^{2} (0.386 sq mi or 247 acres) and river estuaries.

Bourgeauville (French pronunciation: [buʁʒovil]) is a commune in the Calvados department in the Normandy region in northwestern France.

== Population ==
Historical population
Year	Pop.	±% p.a.
1968	147	—
1975	113	−3.69%
1982	123	+1.22%
1990	144	+1.99%
1999	150	+0.45%
2007	140	−0.86%
2012	119	−3.20%
2017	107	−2.10%
2023	104	−0.47%
Source: INSEE

== See also ==
- Communes of the Calvados department
