= Heuland =

- Commune
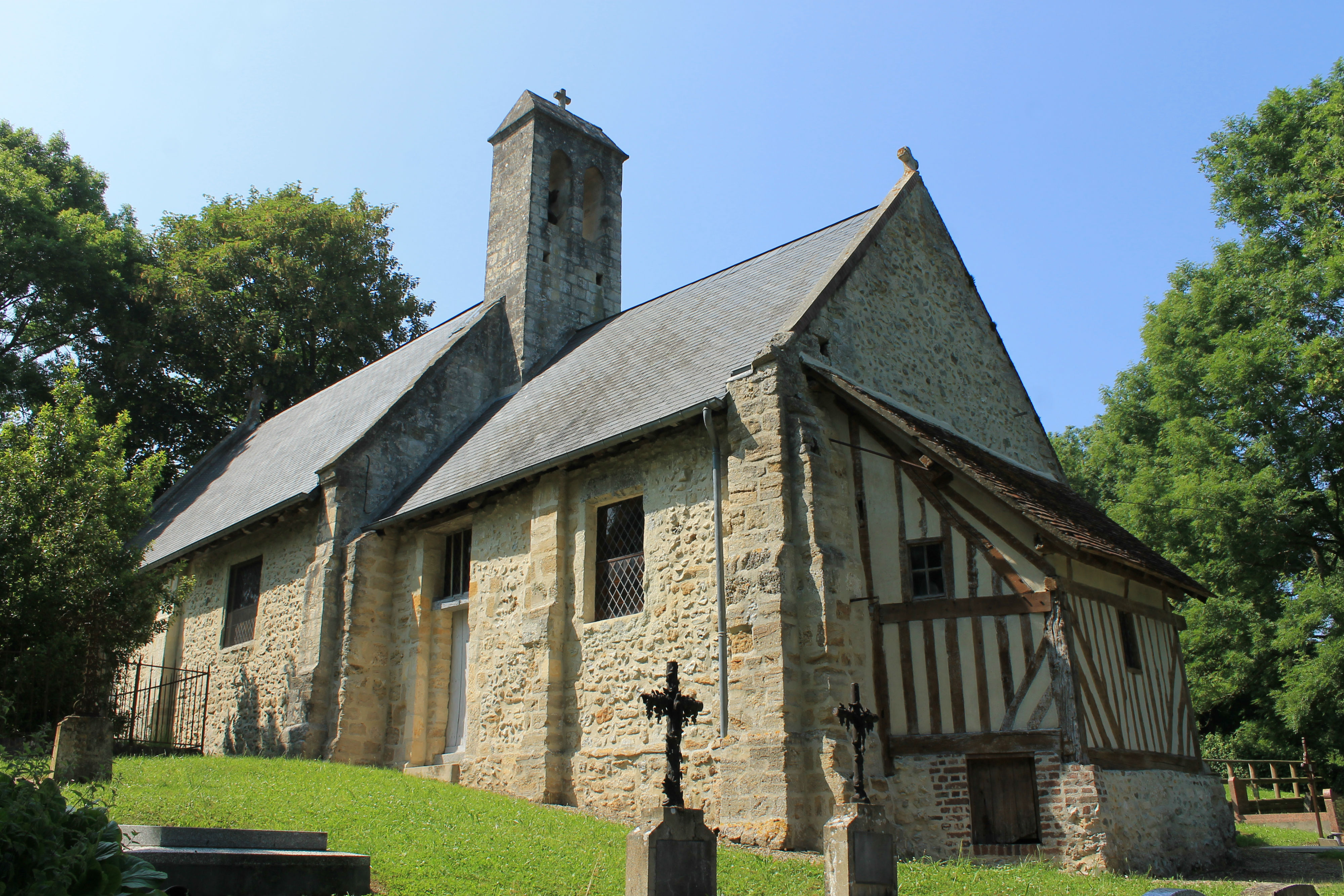
- The church in Heuland

- Coat of arms
- Location of Heuland
- Location within France Location within Normandy
- Coordinates: 49°16′46″N 0°00′01″W
- Country: France
- Region: Normandy
- Department: Calvados
- Arrondissement: Lisieux
- Canton: Cabourg
- Intercommunality: CC Normandie-Cabourg-Pays d'Auge

Government
  - Mayor (2020–2026): Yoan Morlot
- Area^{1}: 3.02 km^{2} (1.17 sq mi)
- Elevation: 147 m (482 ft)
- Highest elevation: 148 m (486 ft)
- Lowest elevation: 25 m (82 ft)
- Population (2023): 148
  - Density: 49.0/km^{2} (127/sq mi)
- Time zone: UTC+01:00 (CET)
  - Summer (DST): UTC+02:00 (CEST)
- INSEE/Postal code: 14329 /14430
- ^{1} French Land Register data, which excludes lakes, ponds, glaciers > 1 km^{2} (0.386 sq mi or 247 acres) and river estuaries.

Heuland (French pronunciation: [ølɑ̃]) is a commune in the Calvados department in the Normandy region in northwestern France.

== Population ==
Historical population
Year	Pop.	±% p.a.
1968	92	—
1975	79	−2.15%
1982	61	−3.63%
1990	54	−1.51%
1999	71	+3.09%
2007	87	+2.57%
2012	81	−1.42%
2017	97	+3.67%
2023	148	+7.30%
Source: INSEE

== See also ==
- Communes of the Calvados department
