= Périers-en-Auge =

- Commune
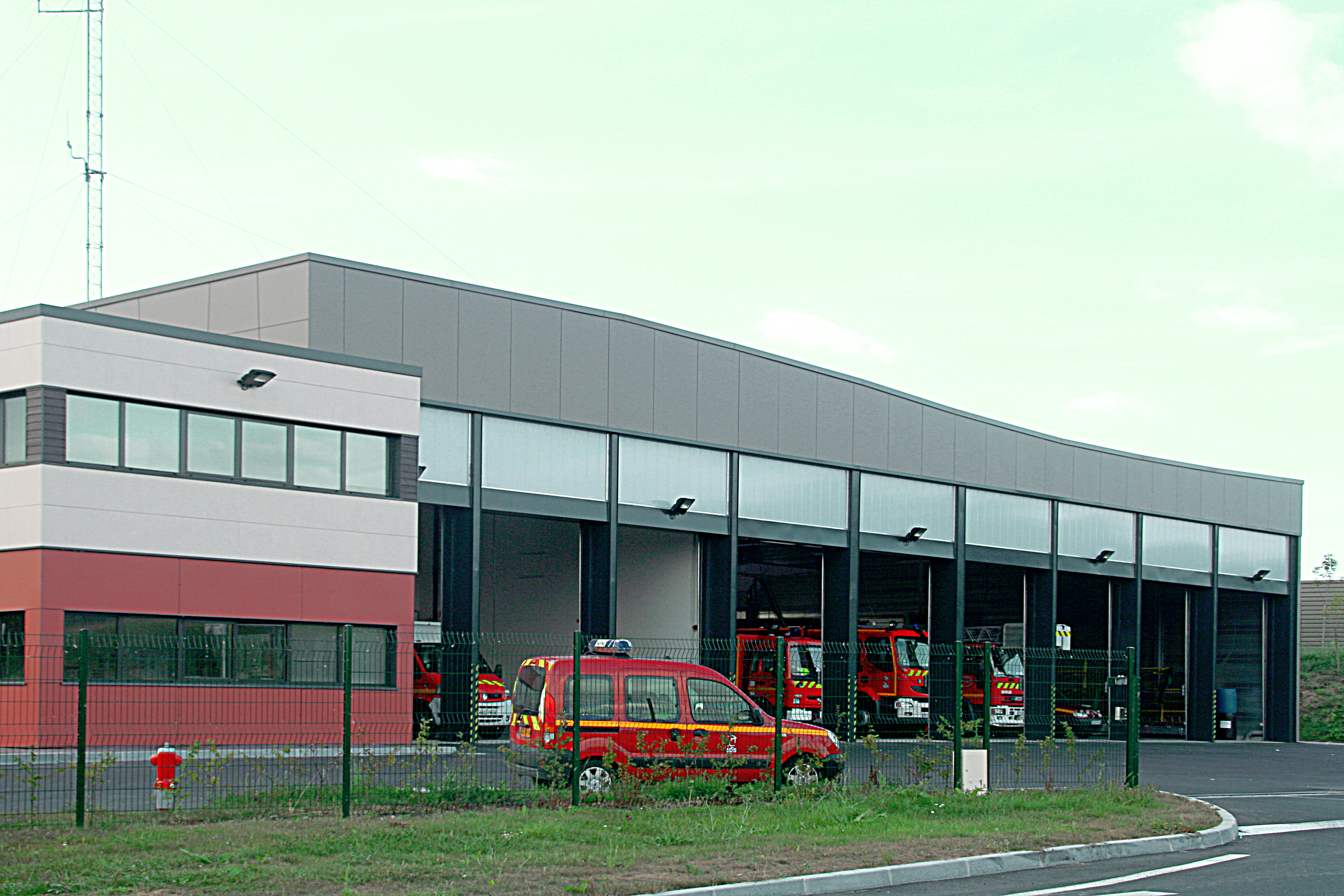
- Fire station
- Location of Périers-en-Auge
- Location within France Location within Normandy
- Coordinates: 49°15′26″N 0°04′42″W
- Country: France
- Region: Normandy
- Department: Calvados
- Arrondissement: Lisieux
- Canton: Cabourg
- Intercommunality: CC Normandie-Cabourg-Pays d'Auge

Government
  - Mayor (2020–2026): Didier Beaujouan
- Area^{1}: 5.09 km^{2} (1.97 sq mi)
- Elevation: 26 m (85 ft)
- Highest elevation: 126 m (413 ft)
- Lowest elevation: 2 m (6.6 ft)
- Population (2023): 119
  - Density: 23.4/km^{2} (60.6/sq mi)
- Time zone: UTC+01:00 (CET)
  - Summer (DST): UTC+02:00 (CEST)
- INSEE/Postal code: 14494 /14160
- ^{1} French Land Register data, which excludes lakes, ponds, glaciers > 1 km^{2} (0.386 sq mi or 247 acres) and river estuaries.

Périers-en-Auge (French pronunciation: [peʁje ɑ̃.n‿oʒ], literally Périers in Auge) is a commune in the Calvados department in the Normandy region in northwestern France.

== Population ==
Historical population
Year	Pop.	±% p.a.
1968	113	—
1975	85	−3.99%
1982	96	+1.75%
1990	114	+2.17%
1999	145	+2.71%
2007	139	−0.53%
2012	133	−0.88%
2017	138	+0.74%
2023	119	−2.44%
Source: INSEE

== See also ==
- Communes of the Calvados department
