= Gonneville-en-Auge =

- Commune
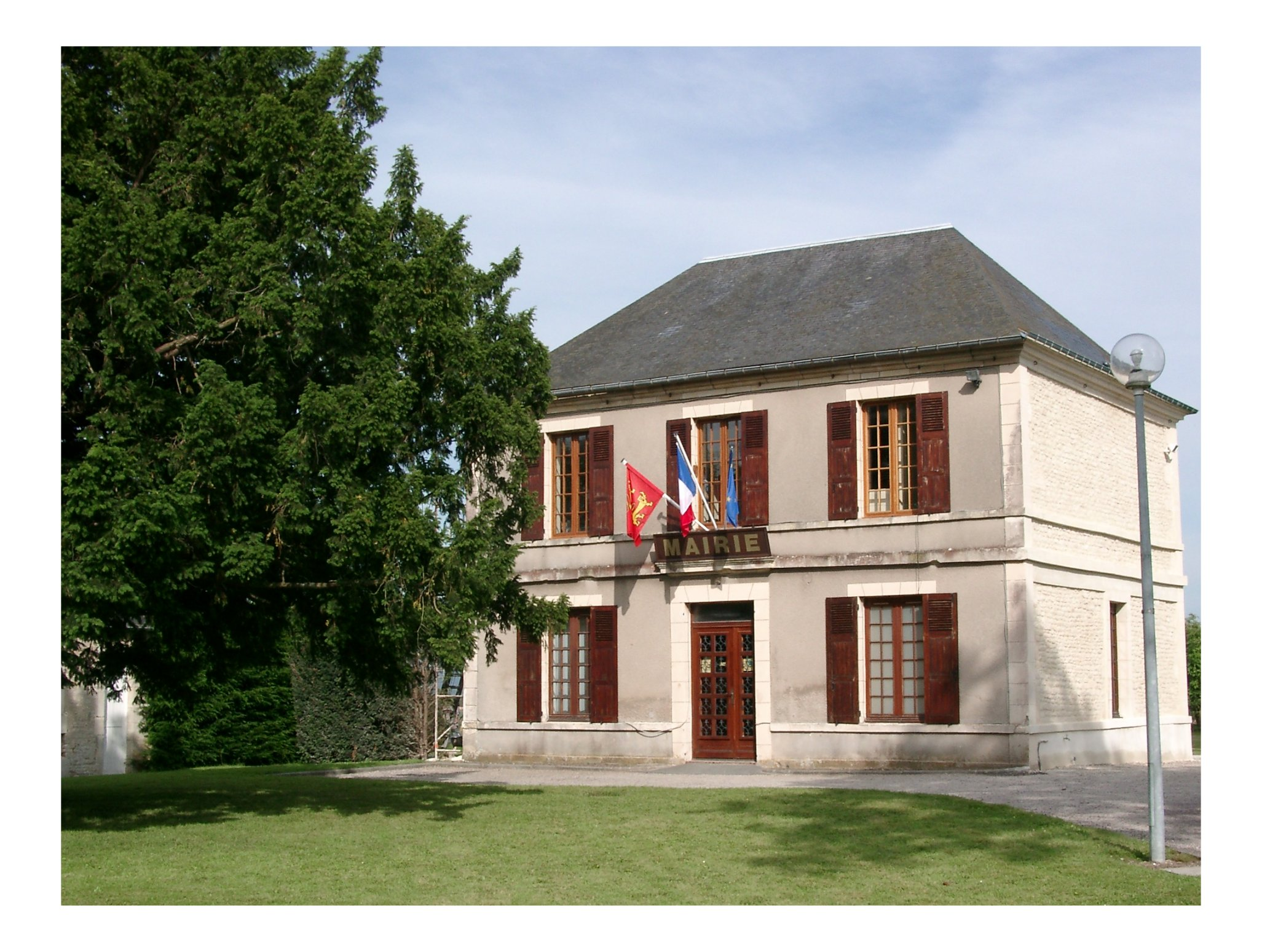
- Town hall
- Location of Gonneville-en-Auge
- Location within France Location within Normandy
- Coordinates: 49°15′36″N 0°11′25″W
- Country: France
- Region: Normandy
- Department: Calvados
- Arrondissement: Lisieux
- Canton: Cabourg
- Intercommunality: CC Normandie-Cabourg-Pays d'Auge

Government
  - Mayor (2020–2026): Harold Lafay
- Area^{1}: 4.32 km^{2} (1.67 sq mi)
- Elevation: 10 m (33 ft)
- Highest elevation: 30 m (98 ft)
- Lowest elevation: 3 m (9.8 ft)
- Population (2023): 390
  - Density: 90/km^{2} (230/sq mi)
- Time zone: UTC+01:00 (CET)
  - Summer (DST): UTC+02:00 (CEST)
- INSEE/Postal code: 14306 /14810
- ^{1} French Land Register data, which excludes lakes, ponds, glaciers > 1 km^{2} (0.386 sq mi or 247 acres) and river estuaries.

Gonneville-en-Auge (French pronunciation: [ɡɔnvil ɑ̃.n‿oʒ], literally Gonneville in Auge) is a commune in the Calvados department in the Normandy region in northwestern France.

== Population ==
Historical population
Year	Pop.	±% p.a.
1968	239	—
1975	229	−0.61%
1982	254	+1.49%
1990	310	+2.52%
1999	351	+1.39%
2007	398	+1.58%
2012	435	+1.79%
2017	392	−2.06%
2023	390	−0.09%
Source: INSEE

== See also ==
- Communes of the Calvados department
