= Saint-Jouin =

- Commune
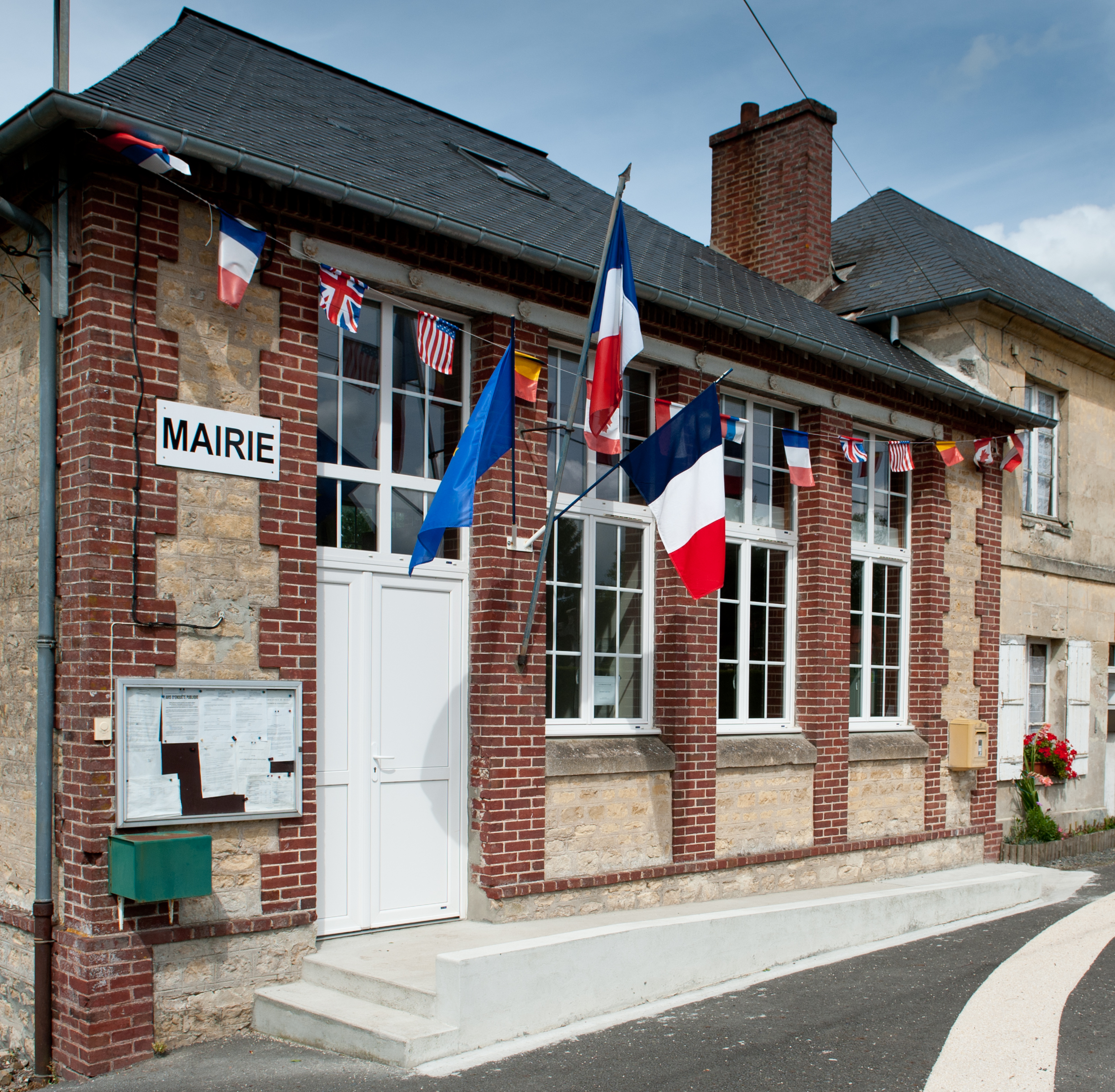
- The town hall in Saint-Jouin
- Location of Saint-Jouin
- Location within France Location within Normandy
- Coordinates: 49°12′37″N 0°00′47″W
- Country: France
- Region: Normandy
- Department: Calvados
- Arrondissement: Lisieux
- Canton: Cabourg
- Intercommunality: CC Normandie-Cabourg-Pays d'Auge

Government
  - Mayor (2020–2026): Roland Journet
- Area^{1}: 5.03 km^{2} (1.94 sq mi)
- Elevation: 145 m (476 ft)
- Highest elevation: 140 m (460 ft)
- Lowest elevation: 30 m (98 ft)
- Population (2023): 300
  - Density: 60/km^{2} (150/sq mi)
- Time zone: UTC+01:00 (CET)
  - Summer (DST): UTC+02:00 (CEST)
- INSEE/Postal code: 14598 /14430
- ^{1} French Land Register data, which excludes lakes, ponds, glaciers > 1 km^{2} (0.386 sq mi or 247 acres) and river estuaries.

Saint-Jouin (French pronunciation: [sɛ̃ ʒwɛ̃]) is a commune in the Calvados department in the Normandy region in northwestern France.

== Population ==
Historical population
Year	Pop.	±% p.a.
1968	168	—
1975	126	−4.03%
1982	130	+0.45%
1990	151	+1.89%
1999	196	+2.94%
2007	210	+0.87%
2012	189	−2.09%
2017	211	+2.23%
2023	300	+6.04%
Source: INSEE

== See also ==
- Communes of the Calvados department
