= Grangues =

- Commune
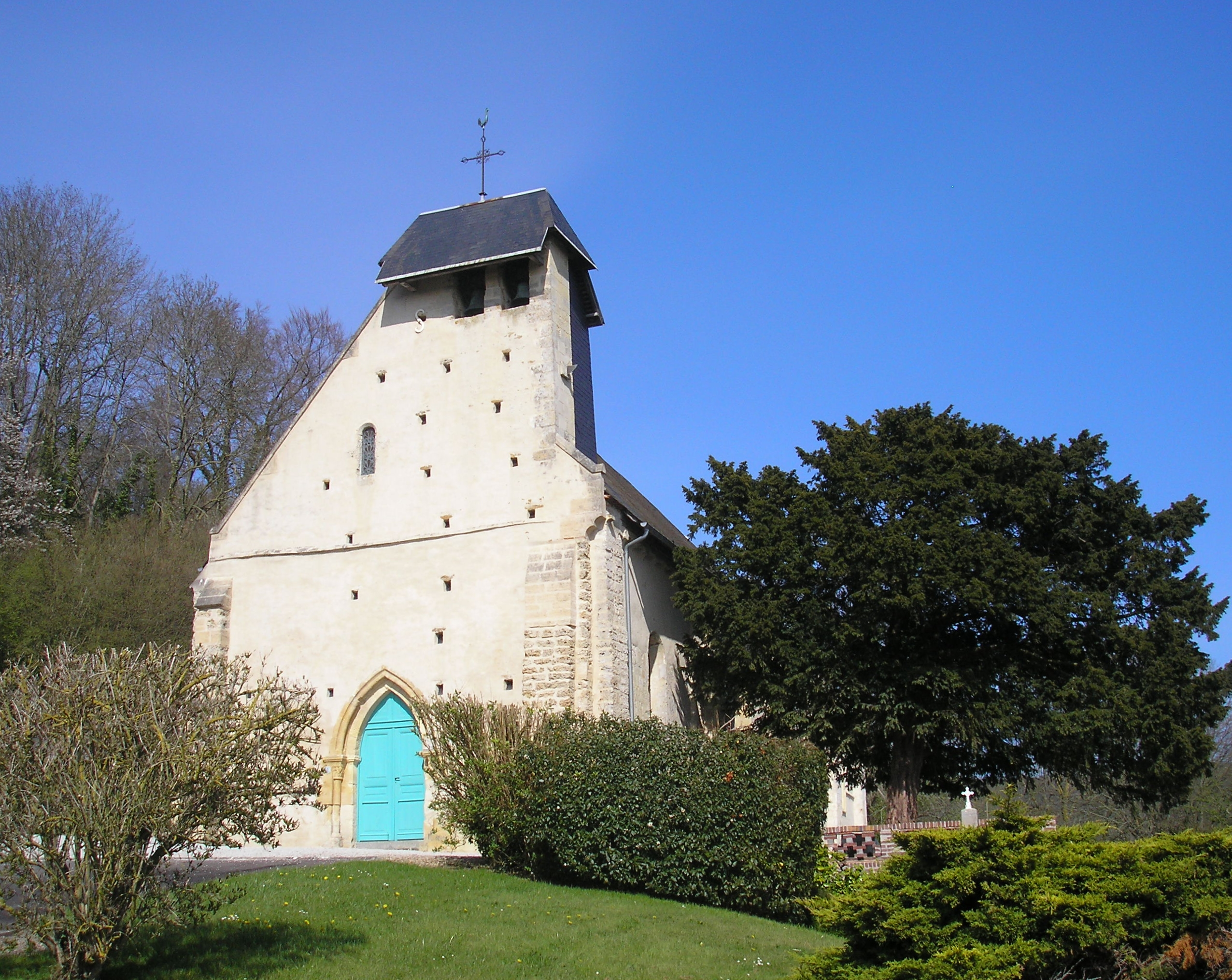
- The church in Grangues

- Coat of arms
- Location of Grangues
- Location within France Location within Normandy
- Coordinates: 49°16′02″N 0°03′14″W
- Country: France
- Region: Normandy
- Department: Calvados
- Arrondissement: Lisieux
- Canton: Cabourg
- Intercommunality: CC Normandie-Cabourg-Pays d'Auge

Government
  - Mayor (2020–2026): Denis Moisson
- Area^{1}: 6.61 km^{2} (2.55 sq mi)
- Elevation: 130 m (430 ft)
- Highest elevation: 141 m (463 ft)
- Lowest elevation: 16 m (52 ft)
- Population (2023): 288
  - Density: 43.6/km^{2} (113/sq mi)
- Time zone: UTC+01:00 (CET)
  - Summer (DST): UTC+02:00 (CEST)
- INSEE/Postal code: 14316 /14160
- ^{1} French Land Register data, which excludes lakes, ponds, glaciers > 1 km^{2} (0.386 sq mi or 247 acres) and river estuaries.

Grangues (French pronunciation: [ɡʁɑ̃ɡ]) is a commune in the Calvados department and Normandy region of north-western France.

== Population ==
Historical population
Year	Pop.	±% p.a.
1968	161	—
1975	143	−1.68%
1982	180	+3.34%
1990	184	+0.28%
1999	241	+3.04%
2007	226	−0.80%
2012	246	+1.71%
2017	249	+0.24%
2023	288	+2.45%
Source: INSEE

== Name ==
The attested forms are de Girangis, without date (cartulary of Préaux); Granchae in 1198 (magni rotuli scacc. p. 58, 2); [Johannes de] Guerengues in 1216 (AC, H 321); [Apud] Grengueis in 1220; Grengues in 1282 (AN, J 220,2); Greyngues in 1282 (cart. norm. n° 996, p. 256); Granges Generenciæ in the 13th century (cart. of Préaux); Grenguez 14th century; Grenchiæ 16th century (Lisieux, p. 52).

This is a medieval toponymic formation, probably old since it is not preceded by the definite article. François de Beaurepaire brings Grangues closer to Goring (Oxford, Garinges 10th century); Goring (Sussex, Garinges 10th century) and Gerringe (Denmark, Gaeringhe 1470), without specifying the etymology. The two British Gorings admit as etymology, either "property of the family or relatives of a man called *Gāra, an unattested Old English personal name, followed by the Germanic suffix -ingas, or “the people at the end, from the corner of the piece of land”, on Old English gāra 'piece of land' + suffix -ingas. The Old Norse word geiri influenced by the Old English gāra 'piece of land, probably triangular' > gaire, is well attested in Norman toponymy, generally it gave the microtoponyms La Gare or La Guerre.

== See also ==
- Communes of the Calvados department
