= Cricqueville-en-Auge =

- Commune
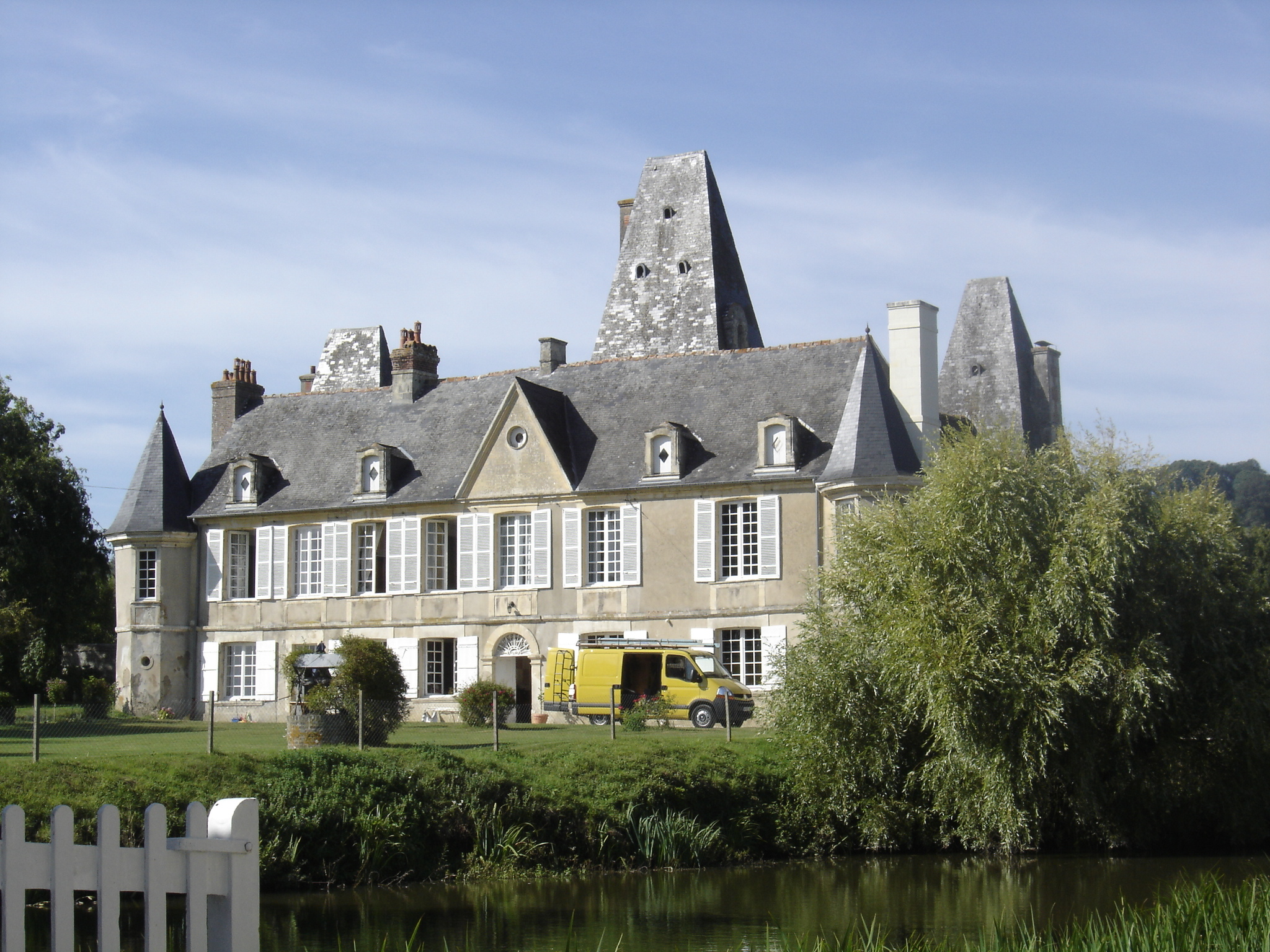
- The chateau in Cricqueville-en-Auge
- Location of Cricqueville-en-Auge
- Location within France Location within Normandy
- Coordinates: 49°14′32″N 0°03′43″W
- Country: France
- Region: Normandy
- Department: Calvados
- Arrondissement: Lisieux
- Canton: Cabourg
- Intercommunality: CC Normandie-Cabourg-Pays d'Auge

Government
  - Mayor (2020–2026): Didier Lecœur
- Area^{1}: 6.79 km^{2} (2.62 sq mi)
- Elevation: 20 m (66 ft)
- Highest elevation: 127 m (417 ft)
- Lowest elevation: 3 m (9.8 ft)
- Population (2023): 185
  - Density: 27.2/km^{2} (70.6/sq mi)
- Time zone: UTC+01:00 (CET)
  - Summer (DST): UTC+02:00 (CEST)
- INSEE/Postal code: 14203 /14430
- ^{1} French Land Register data, which excludes lakes, ponds, glaciers > 1 km^{2} (0.386 sq mi or 247 acres) and river estuaries.

Cricqueville-en-Auge (French pronunciation: [kʁikvil ɑ̃.n‿oʒ], literally Cricqueville in Auge) is a commune in the Calvados department in the Normandy region in northwestern France.

== Population ==
Historical population
Year	Pop.	±% p.a.
1968	120	—
1975	124	+0.47%
1982	102	−2.75%
1990	125	+2.57%
1999	155	+2.42%
2007	184	+2.17%
2012	184	+0.00%
2017	185	+0.11%
2023	185	+0.00%
Source: INSEE

== See also ==
- Cricqueville-en-Bessin
- Communes of the Calvados department
