= Saint-Léger-Dubosq =

- Commune
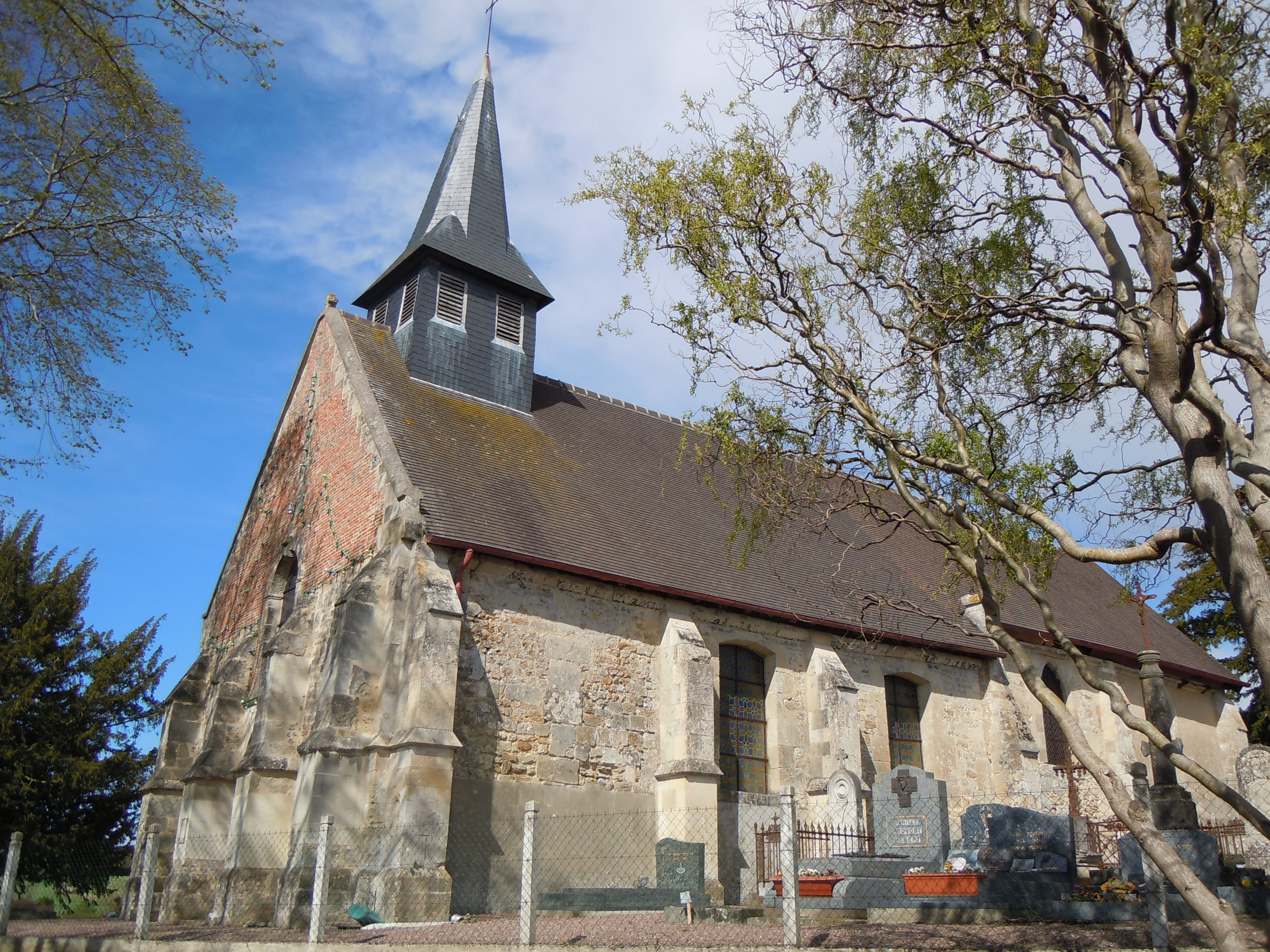
- The church in Saint-Léger-Dubosq

- Coat of arms
- Location of Saint-Léger-Dubosq
- Location within France Location within Normandy
- Coordinates: 49°13′35″N 0°01′38″W
- Country: France
- Region: Normandy
- Department: Calvados
- Arrondissement: Lisieux
- Canton: Cabourg
- Intercommunality: CC Normandie-Cabourg-Pays d'Auge

Government
  - Mayor (2020–2026): Thierry Cambon
- Area^{1}: 4.06 km^{2} (1.57 sq mi)
- Elevation: 120 m (390 ft)
- Highest elevation: 131 m (430 ft)
- Lowest elevation: 17 m (56 ft)
- Population (2023): 251
  - Density: 61.8/km^{2} (160/sq mi)
- Time zone: UTC+01:00 (CET)
  - Summer (DST): UTC+02:00 (CEST)
- INSEE/Postal code: 14606 /14430
- ^{1} French Land Register data, which excludes lakes, ponds, glaciers > 1 km^{2} (0.386 sq mi or 247 acres) and river estuaries.

Saint-Léger-Dubosq is a commune in the Calvados department in the Normandy region in northwestern France.

== Population ==
Historical population
Year	Pop.	±% p.a.
1968	104	—
1975	105	+0.14%
1982	109	+0.54%
1990	130	+2.23%
1999	165	+2.68%
2007	179	+1.02%
2012	172	−0.79%
2017	182	+1.14%
2023	251	+5.50%
Source: INSEE

== See also ==
- Communes of the Calvados department
