= Rumesnil =

- Commune
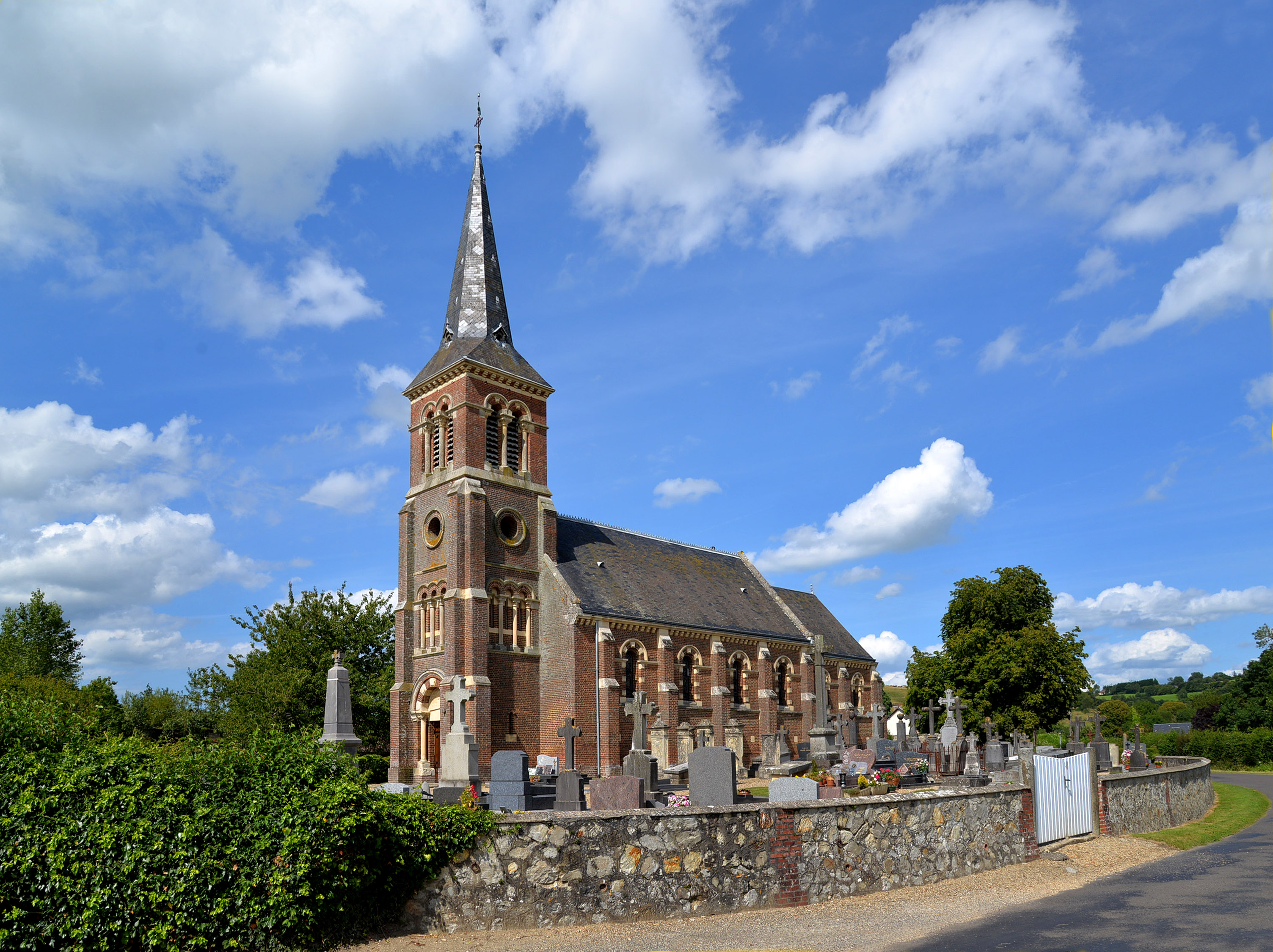
- The church in Rumesnil
- Location of Rumesnil
- Location within France Location within Normandy
- Coordinates: 49°11′08″N 0°01′50″E
- Country: France
- Region: Normandy
- Department: Calvados
- Arrondissement: Lisieux
- Canton: Mézidon Vallée d'Auge
- Intercommunality: CC Normandie-Cabourg-Pays d'Auge

Government
  - Mayor (2020–2026): François Hélie
- Area^{1}: 5.35 km^{2} (2.07 sq mi)
- Elevation: 33 m (108 ft)
- Highest elevation: 121 m (397 ft)
- Lowest elevation: 15 m (49 ft)
- Population (2023): 87
  - Density: 16/km^{2} (42/sq mi)
- Time zone: UTC+01:00 (CET)
  - Summer (DST): UTC+02:00 (CEST)
- INSEE/Postal code: 14550 /14340
- ^{1} French Land Register data, which excludes lakes, ponds, glaciers > 1 km^{2} (0.386 sq mi or 247 acres) and river estuaries.

Rumesnil (French pronunciation: [ʁymenil]) is a commune in the Calvados department in the Normandy region in northwestern France.

== Notable residents ==
- David Hockney, English artist, previously lived in the commune.

== Population ==
Historical population
Year	Pop.	±% p.a.
1968	122	—
1975	86	−4.87%
1982	78	−1.39%
1990	67	−1.88%
1999	80	+1.99%
2007	91	+1.62%
2012	95	+0.86%
2017	101	+1.23%
2023	87	−2.46%
Source: INSEE

== See also ==
- Communes of the Calvados department
