= Branville =

- Commune
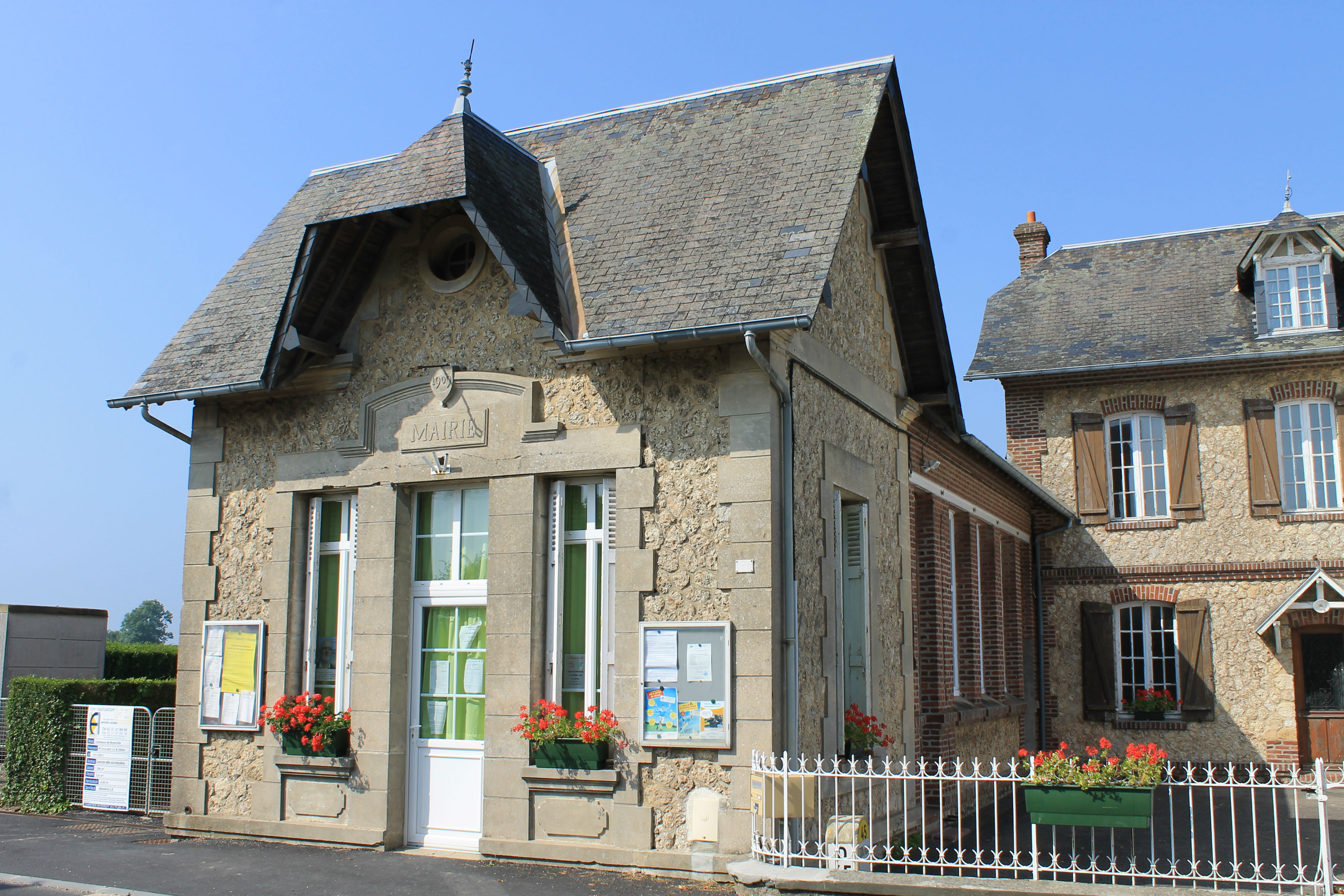
- The town hall in Branville
- Location of Branville
- Location within France Location within Normandy
- Coordinates: 49°16′26″N 0°01′29″E
- Country: France
- Region: Normandy
- Department: Calvados
- Arrondissement: Lisieux
- Canton: Cabourg
- Intercommunality: CC Terre d'Auge

Government
  - Mayor (2020–2026): Stéphanie Clouet
- Area^{1}: 6.39 km^{2} (2.47 sq mi)
- Elevation: 148 m (486 ft)
- Highest elevation: 148 m (486 ft)
- Lowest elevation: 49 m (161 ft)
- Population (2023): 238
  - Density: 37.2/km^{2} (96.5/sq mi)
- Time zone: UTC+01:00 (CET)
  - Summer (DST): UTC+02:00 (CEST)
- INSEE/Postal code: 14093 /14430
- ^{1} French Land Register data, which excludes lakes, ponds, glaciers > 1 km^{2} (0.386 sq mi or 247 acres) and river estuaries.

Branville (French pronunciation: [bʁɑ̃vil]) is a commune in the Calvados department in the Normandy region in northwestern France.

== Population ==
Historical population
Year	Pop.	±% p.a.
1968	136	—
1975	132	−0.43%
1982	151	+1.94%
1990	145	−0.51%
1999	147	+0.15%
2007	194	+3.53%
2012	198	+0.41%
2017	196	−0.20%
2023	238	+3.29%
Source: INSEE

== See also ==
- Communes of the Calvados department
