= Beuvron-en-Auge =

- Commune
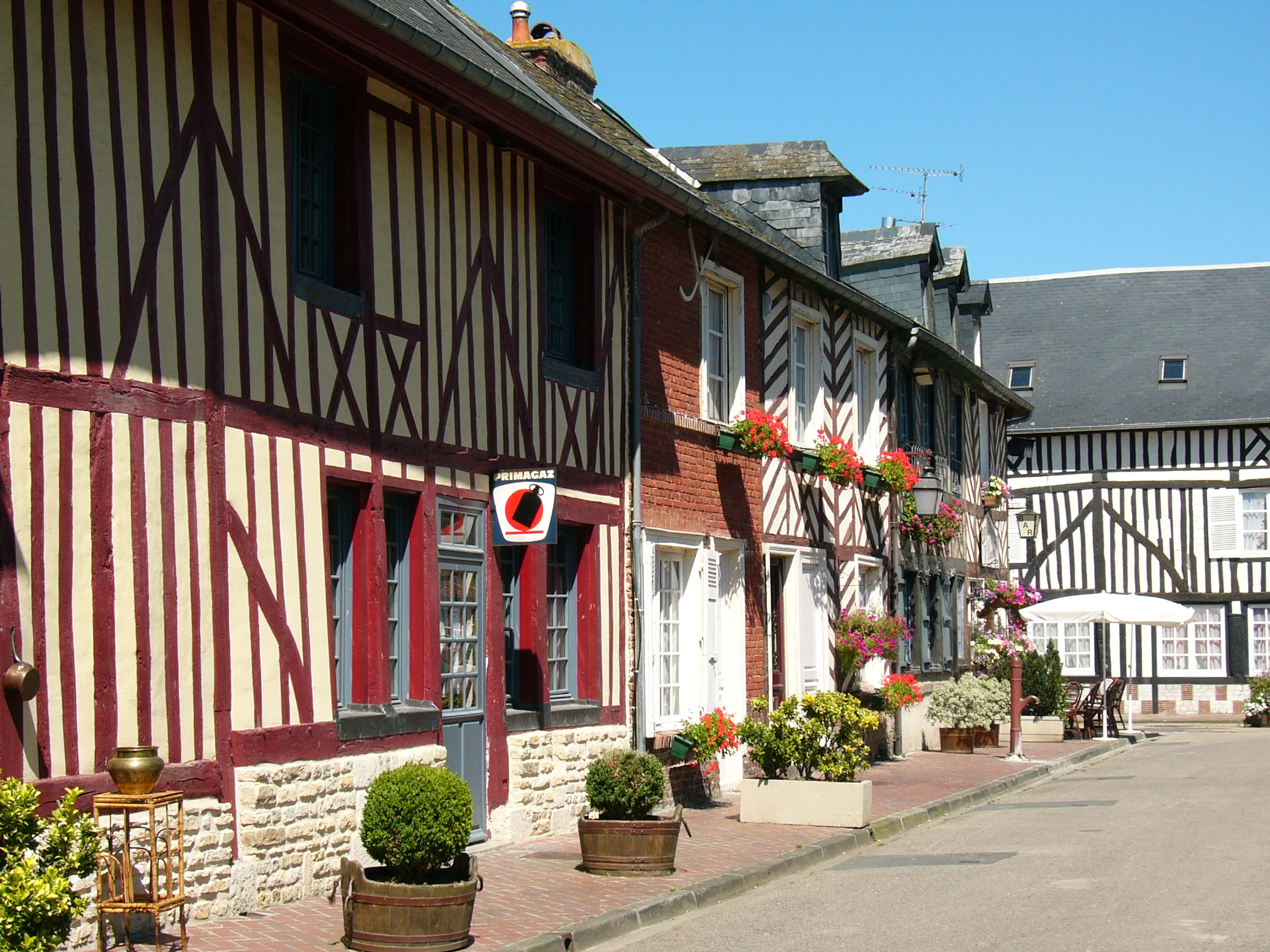
- Shops in Beuvron-en-Auge

- Coat of arms
- Location of Beuvron-en-Auge
- Location within France Location within Normandy
- Coordinates: 49°11′22″N 0°02′40″W
- Country: France
- Region: Normandy
- Department: Calvados
- Arrondissement: Lisieux
- Canton: Mézidon Vallée d'Auge
- Intercommunality: CC Normandie-Cabourg-Pays d'Auge

Government
  - Mayor (2020–2026): Jérôme Bansard
- Area^{1}: 9.68 km^{2} (3.74 sq mi)
- Elevation: 10 m (33 ft)
- Highest elevation: 143 m (469 ft)
- Lowest elevation: 3 m (9.8 ft)
- Population (2023): 203
  - Density: 21.0/km^{2} (54.3/sq mi)
- Time zone: UTC+01:00 (CET)
  - Summer (DST): UTC+02:00 (CEST)
- INSEE/Postal code: 14070 /14430
- ^{1} French Land Register data, which excludes lakes, ponds, glaciers > 1 km^{2} (0.386 sq mi or 247 acres) and river estuaries.

Beuvron-en-Auge (French pronunciation: [bøvʁɔ̃ ɑ̃.n‿oʒ], literally Beuvron in Auge) is a commune in the Calvados department and Normandy region of north-western France.

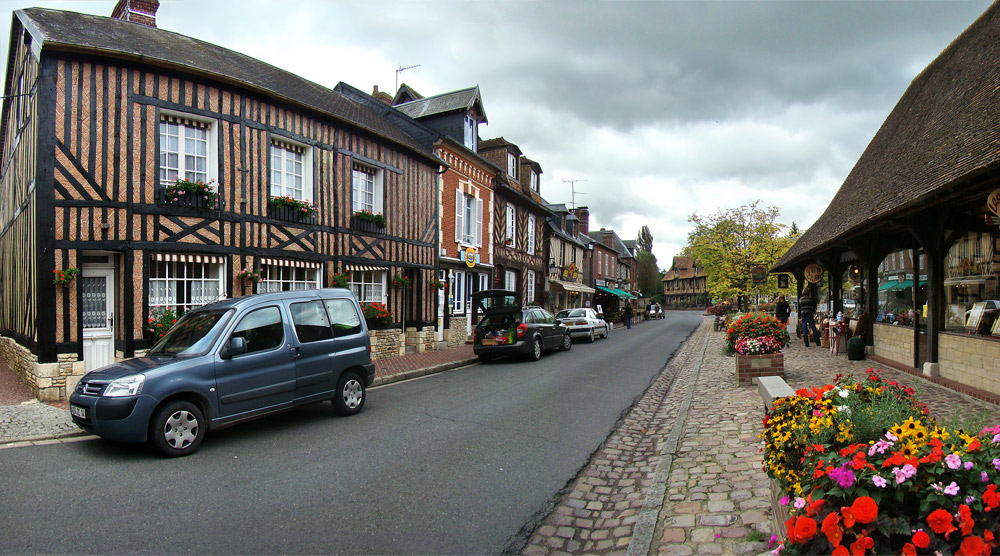
The village centre

Beuvron is affiliated to Les Plus Beaux Villages de France ("the most beautiful villages of France"), an independent association of communes and communities of communes which seeks to promote as tourist destinations those small, picturesque French villages which meet its membership criteria.

In 2012, the commune began partnering with the Japanese city of Hirosaki in Aomori Prefecture, which accounts for 20% of Japan's apple production. The partnership aims to promote economic and touristic development by creating opportunities related to apples.

== Population ==
Historical population
Year	Pop.	±% p.a.
1968	338	—
1975	313	−1.09%
1982	276	−1.78%
1990	274	−0.09%
1999	233	−1.78%
2007	213	−1.12%
2012	242	+2.59%
2017	188	−4.92%
2023	203	+1.29%
Source: INSEE

== See also ==
- Communes of the Calvados department
