= Danestal =

- Commune
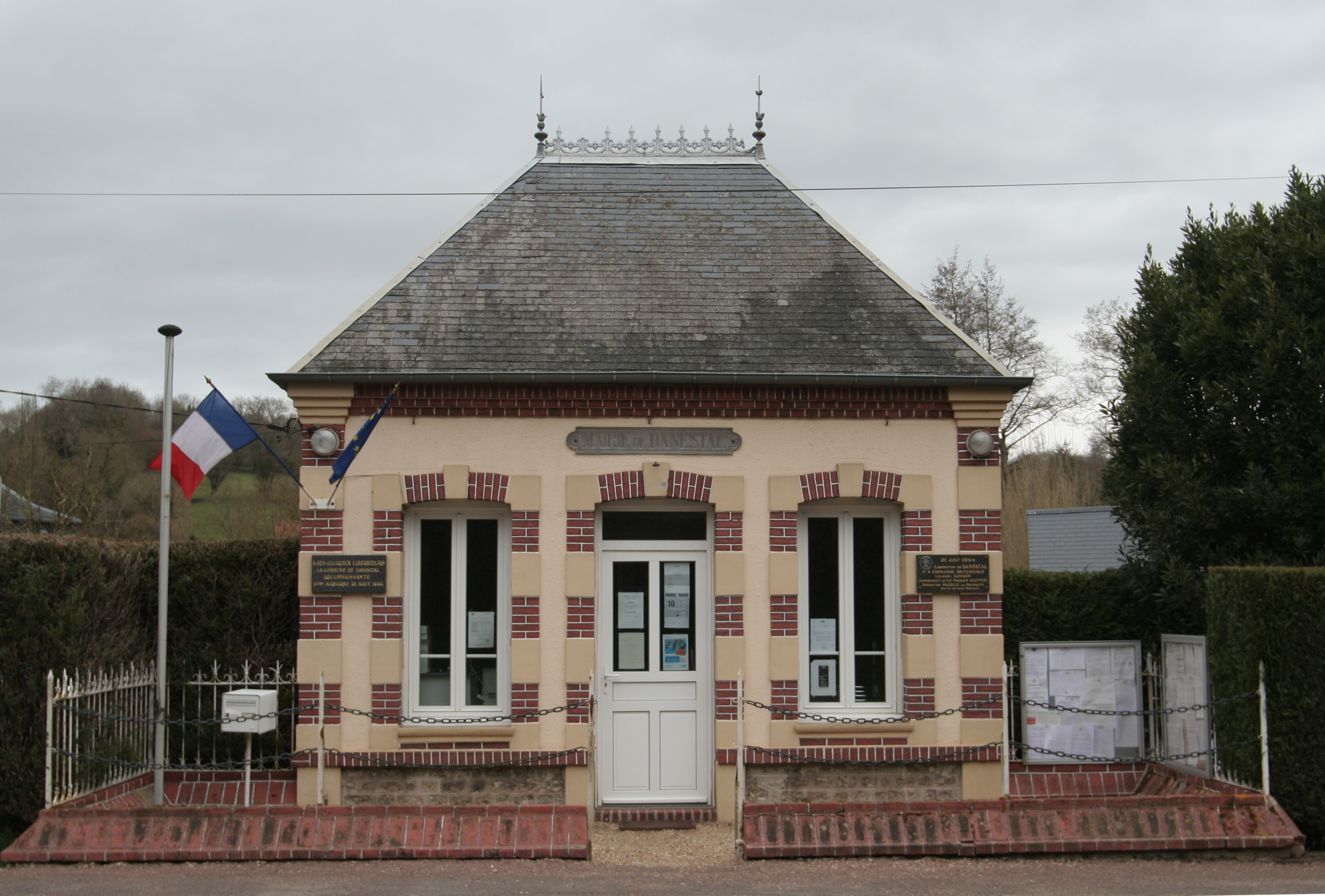
- The town hall in Danestal
- Location of Danestal
- Location within France Location within Normandy
- Coordinates: 49°15′04″N 0°01′18″E
- Country: France
- Region: Normandy
- Department: Calvados
- Arrondissement: Lisieux
- Canton: Cabourg
- Intercommunality: CC Terre d'Auge

Government
  - Mayor (2020–2026): Sophie Mathieu
- Area^{1}: 6.38 km^{2} (2.46 sq mi)
- Elevation: 50 m (160 ft)
- Highest elevation: 150 m (490 ft)
- Lowest elevation: 33 m (108 ft)
- Population (2023): 352
  - Density: 55.2/km^{2} (143/sq mi)
- Time zone: UTC+01:00 (CET)
  - Summer (DST): UTC+02:00 (CEST)
- INSEE/Postal code: 14218 /14430
- ^{1} French Land Register data, which excludes lakes, ponds, glaciers > 1 km^{2} (0.386 sq mi or 247 acres) and river estuaries.

Danestal (French pronunciation: [danɛstal]) is a commune in the Calvados department in the Normandy region in northwestern France.

== Population ==
Historical population
Year	Pop.	±% p.a.
1968	174	—
1975	155	−1.64%
1982	151	−0.37%
1990	199	+3.51%
1999	236	+1.91%
2007	269	+1.65%
2012	332	+4.30%
2017	385	+3.01%
2023	352	−1.48%
Source: INSEE

== See also ==
- Communes of the Calvados department
