= Goustranville =

- Commune
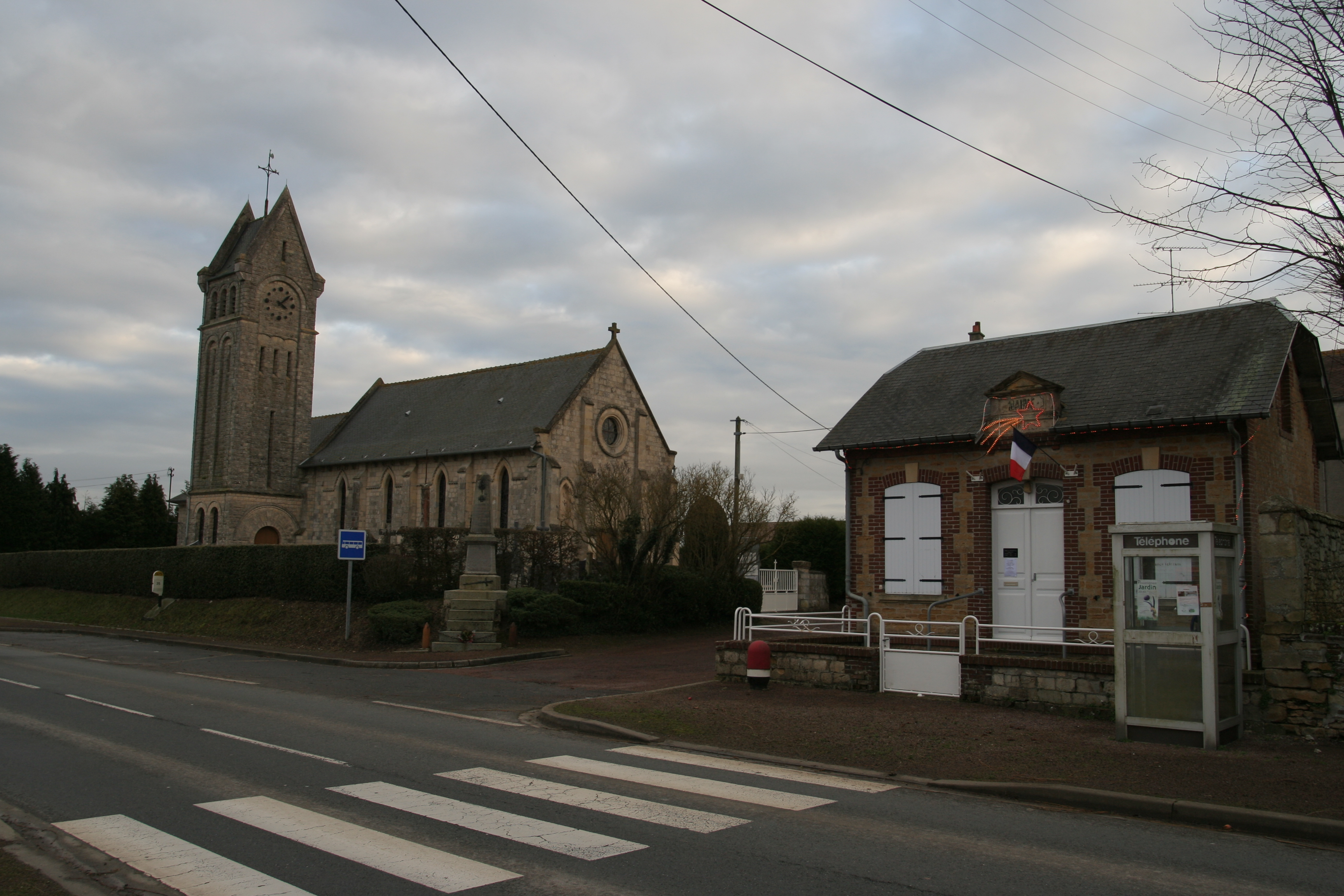
- Church and town hall

- Coat of arms
- Location of Goustranville
- Location within France Location within Normandy
- Coordinates: 49°13′07″N 0°05′46″W
- Country: France
- Region: Normandy
- Department: Calvados
- Arrondissement: Lisieux
- Canton: Cabourg
- Intercommunality: CC Normandie-Cabourg-Pays d'Auge

Government
  - Mayor (2020–2026): Nadia Blin
- Area^{1}: 10.35 km^{2} (4.00 sq mi)
- Elevation: 13 m (43 ft)
- Highest elevation: 28 m (92 ft)
- Lowest elevation: 1 m (3.3 ft)
- Population (2023): 378
  - Density: 36.5/km^{2} (94.6/sq mi)
- Time zone: UTC+01:00 (CET)
  - Summer (DST): UTC+02:00 (CEST)
- INSEE/Postal code: 14308 /14430
- ^{1} French Land Register data, which excludes lakes, ponds, glaciers > 1 km^{2} (0.386 sq mi or 247 acres) and river estuaries.

Goustranville is a commune in the Calvados department in the Normandy region in northwestern France.

== Population ==
Historical population
Year	Pop.	±% p.a.
1968	140	—
1975	137	−0.31%
1982	181	+4.06%
1990	181	+0.00%
1999	187	+0.36%
2007	176	−0.75%
2012	194	+1.97%
2017	201	+0.71%
2023	378	+11.10%
Source: INSEE

== See also ==
- Communes of the Calvados department
