= Petiville, Calvados =

Petiville
- Commune
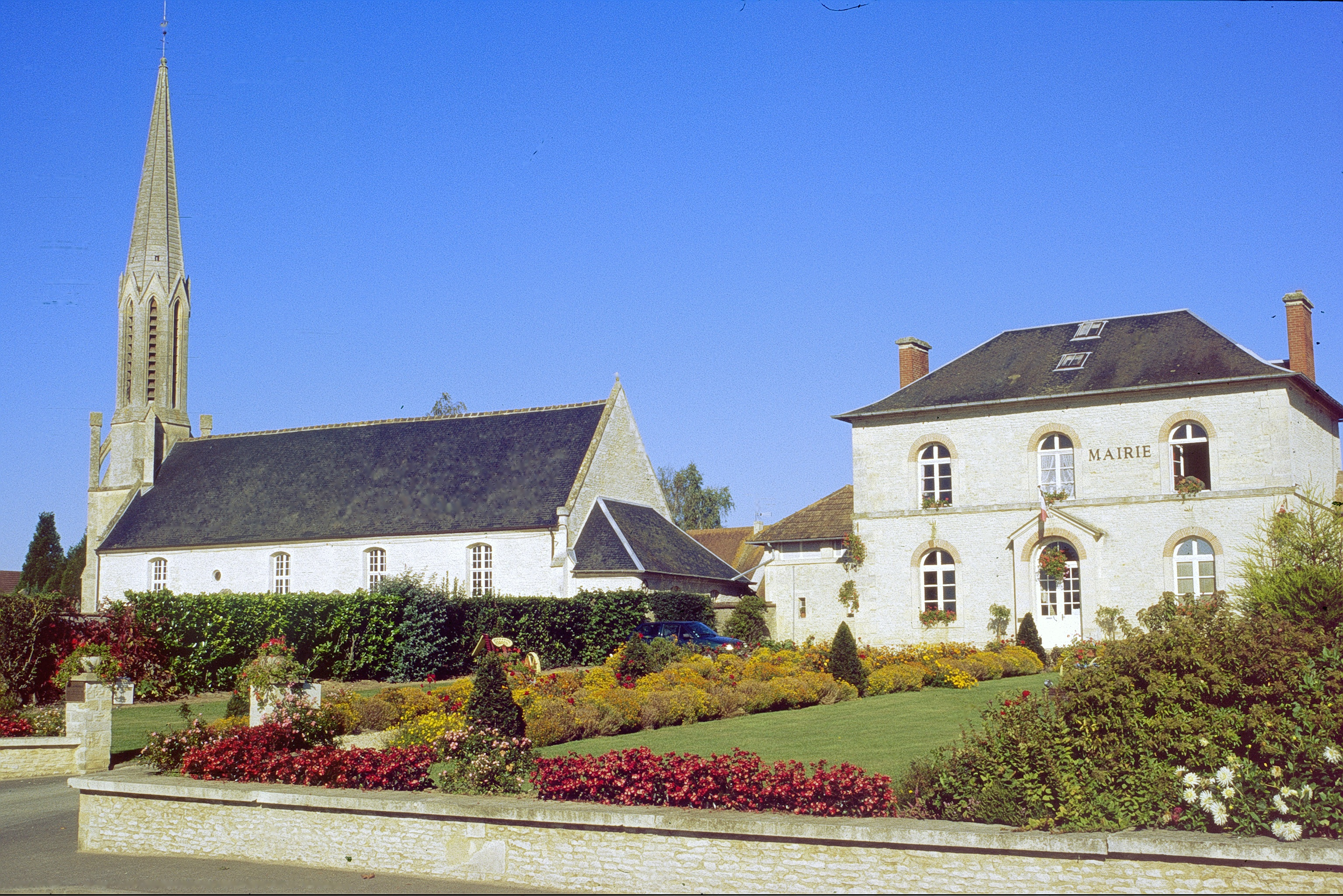
- Town hall and Notre-Dame church

- Coat of arms
- Location of Petiville
- Location within France Location within Normandy
- Coordinates: 49°14′36″N 0°10′30″W
- Country: France
- Region: Normandy
- Department: Calvados
- Arrondissement: Lisieux
- Canton: Cabourg
- Intercommunality: CC Normandie-Cabourg-Pays d'Auge

Government
  - Mayor (2020–2026): Lionel Maillard
- Area^{1}: 2.89 km^{2} (1.12 sq mi)
- Elevation: 15 m (49 ft)
- Highest elevation: 25 m (82 ft)
- Lowest elevation: 2 m (6.6 ft)
- Population (2023): 560
  - Density: 190/km^{2} (500/sq mi)
- Time zone: UTC+01:00 (CET)
  - Summer (DST): UTC+02:00 (CEST)
- INSEE/Postal code: 14499 /14390
- ^{1} French Land Register data, which excludes lakes, ponds, glaciers > 1 km^{2} (0.386 sq mi or 247 acres) and river estuaries.

Petiville (French pronunciation: [pətivil]) is a commune in the Calvados department in the Normandy region in northwestern France.

== Population ==
Historical population
| Year | Pop. | ±% p.a. |
|---|---|---|
| 1968 | 163 | — |
| 1975 | 159 | −0.35% |
| 1982 | 271 | +7.91% |
| 1990 | 400 | +4.99% |
| 1999 | 432 | +0.86% |
| 2007 | 486 | +1.48% |
| 2012 | 519 | +1.32% |
| 2017 | 508 | −0.43% |
| 2023 | 560 | +1.64% |
Source: INSEE

== International relations ==
Petiville is twinned with Lydford, UK

== See also ==
- Communes of the Calvados department
