= Cresseveuille =

- Commune
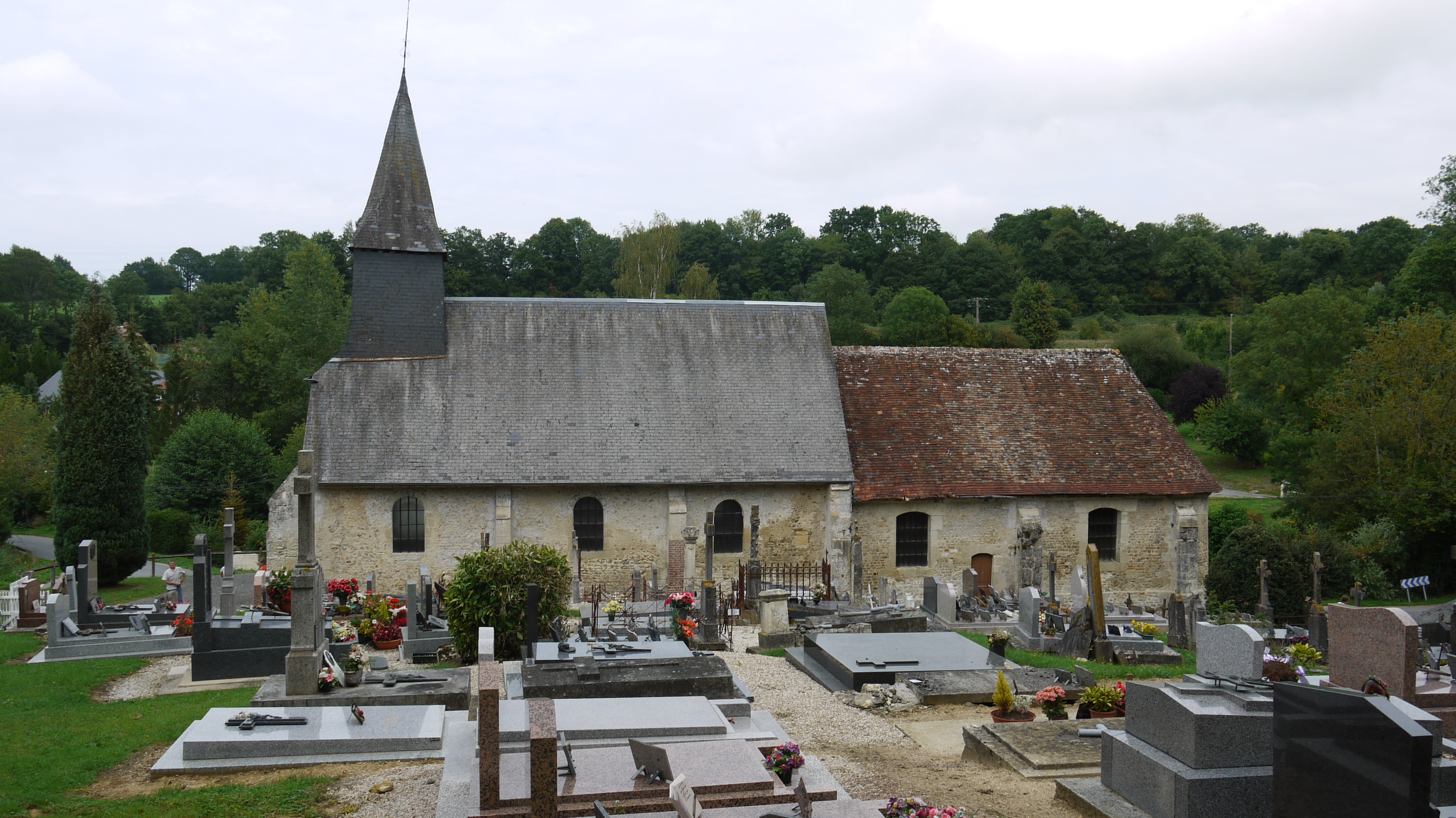
- The church in Cresseveuille

- Coat of arms
- Location of Cresseveuille
- Location within France Location within Normandy
- Coordinates: 49°14′32″N 0°00′38″E
- Country: France
- Region: Normandy
- Department: Calvados
- Arrondissement: Lisieux
- Canton: Cabourg
- Intercommunality: CC Normandie-Cabourg-Pays d'Auge

Government
  - Mayor (2020–2026): Serge Marie
- Area^{1}: 5.48 km^{2} (2.12 sq mi)
- Elevation: 100 m (330 ft)
- Highest elevation: 136 m (446 ft)
- Lowest elevation: 25 m (82 ft)
- Population (2023): 257
  - Density: 46.9/km^{2} (121/sq mi)
- Time zone: UTC+01:00 (CET)
  - Summer (DST): UTC+02:00 (CEST)
- INSEE/Postal code: 14198 /14430
- ^{1} French Land Register data, which excludes lakes, ponds, glaciers > 1 km^{2} (0.386 sq mi or 247 acres) and river estuaries.

Cresseveuille (French pronunciation: [kʁɛsvœj]) is a commune in the Calvados department in the Normandy region in northwestern France.

== Population ==
Historical population
Year	Pop.	±% p.a.
1968	183	—
1975	138	−3.95%
1982	128	−1.07%
1990	167	+3.38%
1999	212	+2.69%
2007	293	+4.13%
2012	266	−1.91%
2017	262	−0.30%
2023	257	−0.32%
Source: INSEE

== See also ==
- Communes of the Calvados department
