= Auvillars =

- Commune
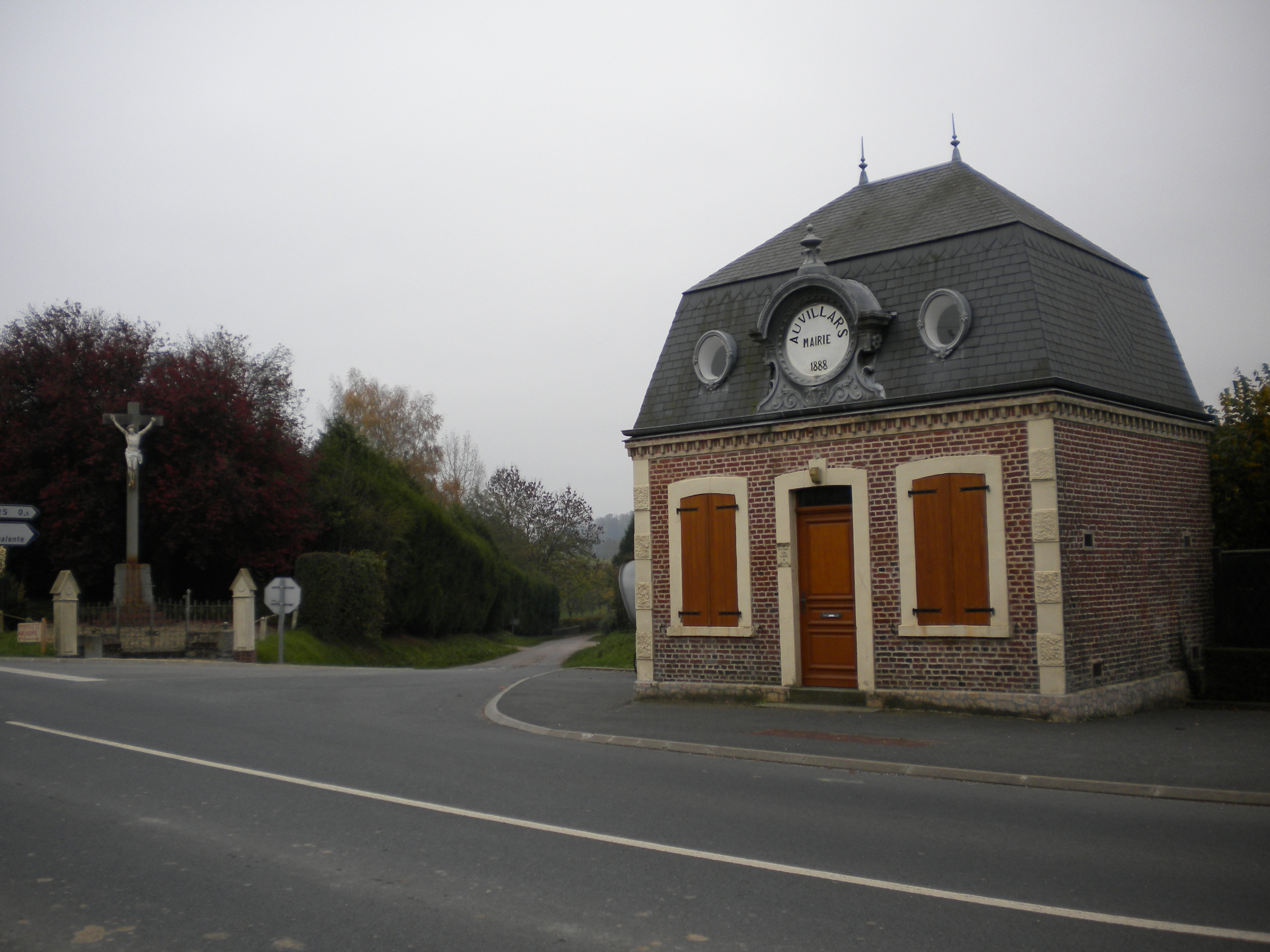
- Town hall
- Location of Auvillars
- Location within France Location within Normandy
- Coordinates: 49°11′52″N 0°03′59″E
- Country: France
- Region: Normandy
- Department: Calvados
- Arrondissement: Lisieux
- Canton: Mézidon Vallée d'Auge
- Intercommunality: CC Terre d'Auge

Government
  - Mayor (2020–2026): Sébastien Maheut
- Area^{1}: 11.62 km^{2} (4.49 sq mi)
- Elevation: 100 m (330 ft)
- Highest elevation: 154 m (505 ft)
- Lowest elevation: 36 m (118 ft)
- Population (2023): 238
  - Density: 20.5/km^{2} (53.0/sq mi)
- Time zone: UTC+01:00 (CET)
  - Summer (DST): UTC+02:00 (CEST)
- INSEE/Postal code: 14033 /14340
- ^{1} French Land Register data, which excludes lakes, ponds, glaciers > 1 km^{2} (0.386 sq mi or 247 acres) and river estuaries.

Auvillars (French pronunciation: [ovilaʁ]) is a commune in the Calvados department in the Normandy region of north-western France.

== Geography ==
Auvillars is located some 14 km north-west of Lisieux and 17 km south-east of Cabourg. Access to the commune is by the D16 road from Léaupartie in the south-west which passes through the centre of the commune and the village and continues to Bonnebosq in the north-east. The D101 passes through the east of the commune as it goes from Cambremer to Pont-l'Évêque. The D59 which connects Bonnebosq to La Boissière passes south through the commune. The commune is entirely farmland except for a few scattered forests.

The Dorette river passes through the centre of the commune from north-east to south-west and it continues south-west to join the Dives at Le Radier. The Mont Dorain rises in the north of the commune and flows south to join the Dorette. The Ruisseau Sainte-Agathe flows from the east to join the Dorette near the village.

== History ==
In his Monumental Statistics of Calvados (1862), Arcisse de Caumont described the history of Auvillars as follows:

"As always, Auvillars had the first lords of the members of a family whose name was that of the commune itself. This family became extinct in the person of Jeanne d'Auvillars, daughter and heiress of Guillaume, lord and chatelain of Auvillars, Saint Aubin de Salona, and Barneville who married Robert de Tournebu, Baron de la Motte-Cesny, Grimbosc, etc. at the beginning of the 14th century.

Mr Floquet told of a curious trial that argued that Robert de Tournebu, lord of Auvillars, maltreated a cleric of the priory of Beaumont-en-Auge in the year 1342. He was sentenced to a fine of 400 livres, a huge sum for that time (see History of the Parliament of Normandy). A century later Richard de Tournebu more usefully employed his vigour to support a heroic siege against the captains of the invader Henry V. His capitulation on 7 August 1417 was devised on condition that showed the Norman barons, despite the lack of organization where the invasion had landed, had not made a capable resistance that could be respected. The text of the capitulation was published in the volume entitled rotuli normanniae printed in London in 1835 on page 285 and by the Society of Antiquaries of Normandy, Volume XV, page 263 of his memoirs.

Just as the castle was to be evacuated Henry hastened to donate it to the Earl of Salisbury, his cousin, to be sure of its conservation (25 September 1417).

At the time of death of Guillemette de Tournebu in 1485 Jean de Harcourt, his great-grandson, inherited and he added to his other titles that of lord and chatelain of Auvillars. In 1558, Auvillars was in the hands of a family named Salcede: Nicolas Salcede, the owner in 1582, was at that time involved in a conspiracy formed, it is said, by the Guises against the Duke of Alençon and King Henry III, his brother. He was tried by the Parliament of Paris, convicted of the crime of treason, and as such condemned to be quartered. This execution, the memory of which is still preserved in Auvillars, must have taken place around 1588. In 1600 Mme Charlotte Duquesnel d'Aussebost was Dowager of Auvillars. After her death in 1617 the lordship passed to a family named Miou. The head of this family was one of the principal officers of the Duke of Lorraine and his daughter, Louise Marie de Miou, married Pierre Dauvet of Tréguy.

The Dauvet family were nobility from Picardy who were allied to Breze, Montmorency, Saint-Simon, Bethune, Chabannes, etc.

Several of its members took to the sword. Benoit Dauvet and Louis-Nicolas Dauvet distinguished themselves in the battles of Louis XIV and Louis XV.

There is information on this house in the History of the great officers of the Crown by P Anselm. Its door was lined with gold and silver in 6 pieces: the first charged with a black lion passant in bend. A Marquisate crown; supported by two savages (see Waroquier, Vol. VII).

Thus one sees the arms on the funeral litre (Note: A Litre funéraire or Funeral litre was a black band along the wall of the church to commemorate a prominent person who had died.) in the Chapel of Saint Jean d'Auvillars.

In 1700 Sir Peter Dauvet de Tréguy gave grassland to the poor of Auvillars which was located at Druval and Rumesnil. They still enjoy. The same lords from the Dauvet family founded a school for girls and from their private income. The children of the two parishes of Auvillars and Repentigny were educated there free by a sister of Providence from the Lisieux house. The income was lost through a faulty title. The house was sold by the revolutionaries and was bought by a resident who gave it back to its original purpose.

The presbytery, which had been confiscated, was bought by the commune around 1806.

There were 3 privileged fires and 80 taxable fires at Auvillars.

The small parish of Repentigny has always been a kind of dependency to that of Auvillars. The Lords of Auvillars were patrons, as for Repentigny, and they constantly showed benevolence. The parish had first been removed and reunited with Rumesnil but at the beginning of the reign of Charles X it was reunited with Auvillars as an independent vicariate".

== Administration ==
List of successive mayors

| From | To | Name |
|---|---|---|
| 1800 | 1806 | Jean Pierre Conard |
| 1806 | 1808 | Jean Baptiste Ménard |
| 1808 | 1815 | Jean Baptiste Martin |
| 1816 | 1817 | Jacques Constant Fosse |
| 1817 | 1825 | Jean Baptiste Martin |
| 1825 | 1831 | Robert Baril |
| 1832 | 1834 | Jean Baptiste Desfontaines |
| 1835 | 1837 | Pierre Augustin Ruelle |
| 1837 | 1843 | Jean Pierre de la Morinière |
| 1843 | 1851 | Auguste Baudouin |
| 1851 | 1872 | Jacques Alexandre Cavelier |
| 1872 | 1873 | Jean Pierre Questel |
| 1874 | 1879 | Jacques Amand Duval |
| 1879 | 1883 | Hyacinthe Suzanne |
| 1883 | 1902 | Frédéric Marguerite |
| 1933 | 1953 | Alexandre Leprévost |
| 1953 | 1981 | René Colard |
| 1981 | 1995 | Louis Sandret |
| 1995 | 2020 | Pascal Laleman |
| 2020 | 2026 | Sébastien Maheut |

== Demography ==
The inhabitants of the commune are known as Auvillargeois or Auvillargeoises in French.

Historical population

| Year | Pop. | ±% p.a. |
|---|---|---|
| 1793 | 530 | — |
| 1821 | 503 | −0.19% |
| 1846 | 446 | −0.48% |
| 1872 | 346 | −0.97% |
| 1901 | 306 | −0.42% |
| 1926 | 278 | −0.38% |
| 1946 | 237 | −0.79% |
| 1962 | 224 | −0.35% |
| 1968 | 185 | −3.14% |

| Year | Pop. | ±% p.a. |
|---|---|---|
| 1975 | 177 | −0.63% |
| 1982 | 158 | −1.61% |
| 1990 | 178 | +1.50% |
| 1999 | 178 | +0.00% |
| 2007 | 209 | +2.03% |
| 2012 | 230 | +1.93% |
| 2017 | 227 | −0.26% |
| 2023 | 238 | +0.79% |

Source: EHESS and INSEE

== Culture and heritage ==
=== Civil heritage ===
The commune has a number of buildings that are registered as historical monuments:

- La Bruyère Manor (15th century)
- La Bruyère Manor Garden (1972)
- A Brickworks (1879)

=== Religious heritage ===
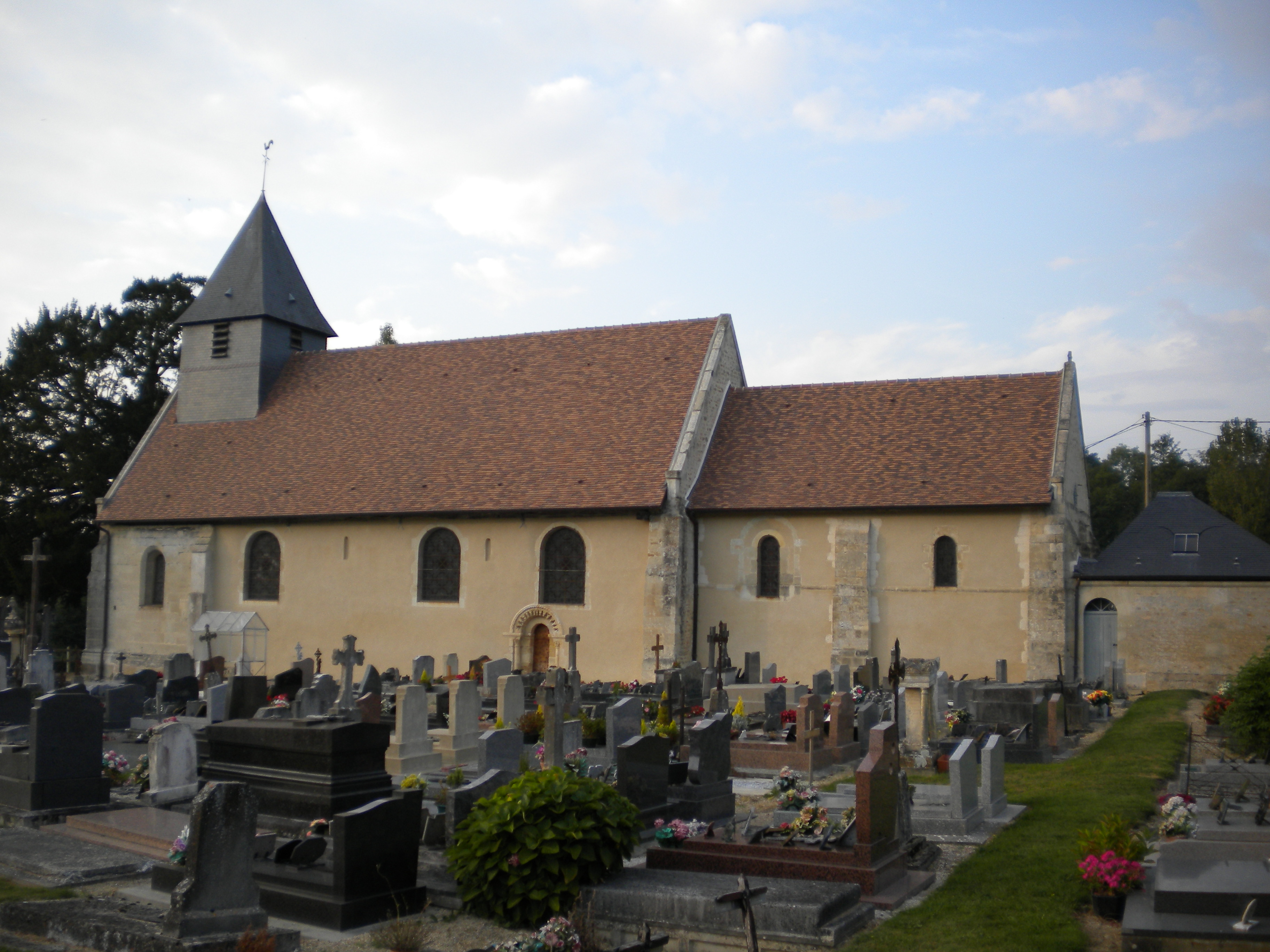
The Church of Saint Germain

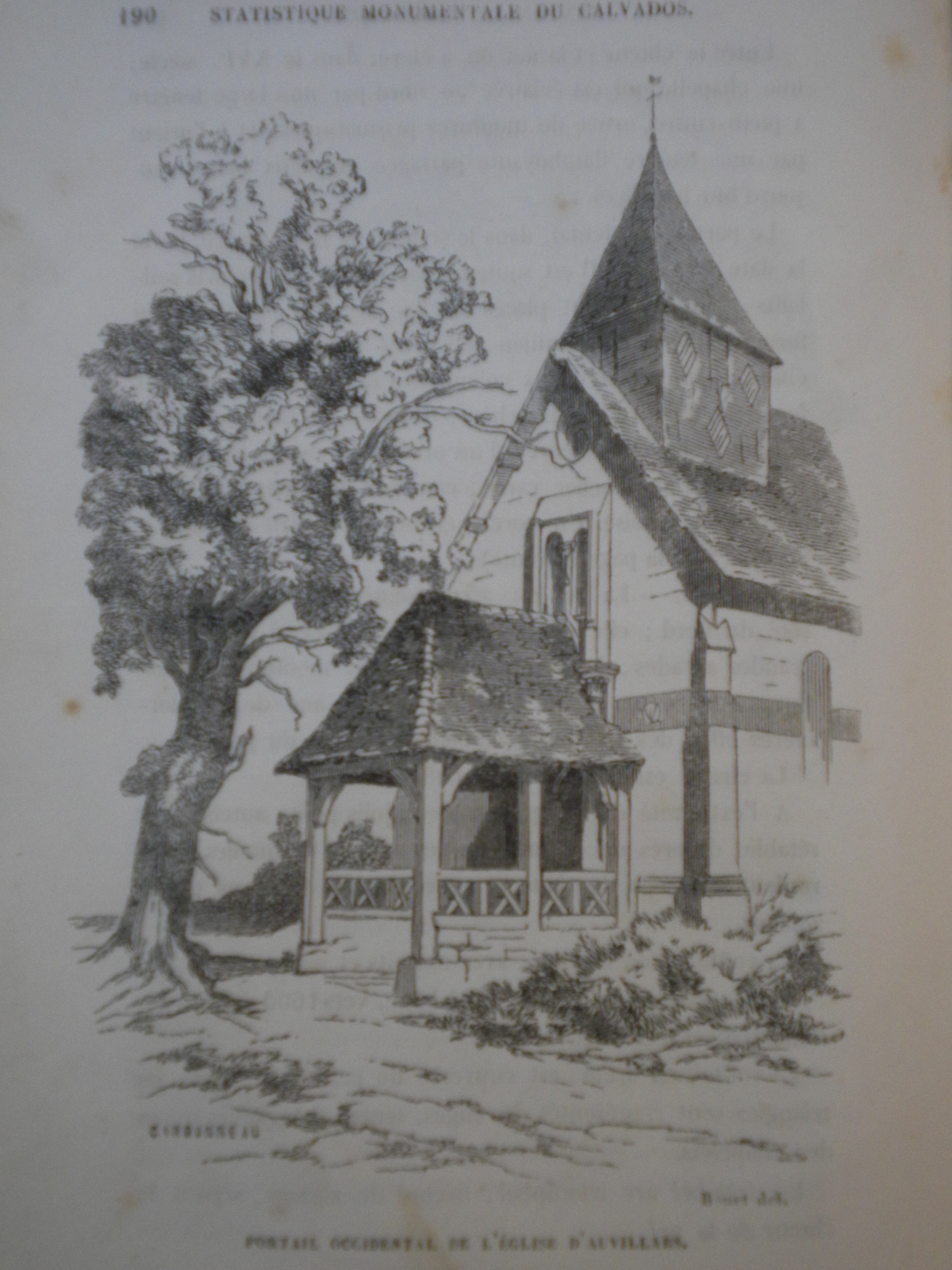
Drawing of the western portal of the church

The commune has one religious building that is registered as an historical monument:

- The Church of Saint Germain (12th century)

==== The Church of Saint Germain ====
The church is built in a valley about 1 km from the town of Bonnebosq.

===== The choir =====
The whole choir dates back to the 12th century. It is lit on the north side by two narrow arched windows devoid of any ornament and very splayed on the inside; to the south is a similar window, enlarged a little on the outside, and a large modern semicircular window. The side walls each have two flat buttresses inside which is a newly built gallery leading to the sacristy placed behind the choir. The choir ends on the eastern side by a right chevet supported by three flat buttresses. There were originally two narrow semicircular windows that have been blocked. The gable is surmounted by an antefix cross.

===== The nave =====
The southern wall of the nave, without buttresses, shows a device of fern leaves. It is pierced by a semicircular door whose lintel is decorated with zigzags based on the columns. The arch is topped with grimacing heads of fantastic animals whose tongues are wrapped around a Torus that lines the underside of the arch (see photo). The nave is lit on this side by four very large semicircular windows, three of which are modern. The fourth is a little less wide and lined with a simple bevel and dates from first half of the 16th century when the nave was extended by one bay.

The northern wall was erected in the 16th century. It is flanked by projecting buttresses and pierced by three windows, one flamboyant and divided by a mullion, another a low arch ornamented with prismatic mouldings, and the other a modern window without character. This wall has the remains of a funeral litre.

===== The chapel =====
A chapel was built between the choir and the nave in the 16th century. The chapel is illuminated on the north side by a large semicircular window ornamented with prismatic mouldings and to the east by a flamboyant window divided into two bays which are today blocked.

===== The west portal =====
The western portal is in a renaissance style and is dated 1538. It is supported by four projecting buttresses, two of which are placed on the corners. The portal, which protrudes toward the middle, is pierced by a semi-circular door flanked by two columns and topped with two windows, now blocked, and decorated with prismatic mouldings. The curved form is pierced at the same time by an oculus and surmounted by a square tower built in timber and covered with slate. A wooden porch was previously in front of portal.

===== Inside =====
- The nave is separated from the aisle by four large arches including two of ogival form with prismatic mouldings and the other two semicircular. One of them has features similar to those of the door.
- The pulpit is in Louis XV style.
- At the end of the nave are two little altars with the altarpiece decorated with twisted columns around which are wound vines and crowned with trapezoidal pediments.
- The vault is in wood with tie beams and hallmarks.
- The Chapel of the Virgin was built around 1600 by the Dauvet d'Auvillars family.
- The roof of the vault is covered with paintings. In the triangles there are angels holding rosaries in their hands.
- A triumphal arch decorated with zigzags separates the chancel from the nave.
- One of the windows that illuminate the choir, to the north has remnants of stained glass. A head of the Virgin can still be seen adorned with a ducal crown and there are two religious figures, one of which is holding a chalice. The bottom of this window reads: De tournebu cure
- The altar is decorated in the Louis XV style. The tabernacle is decorated with angels and caryatids.
- There is a large Romanesque credenza on the side of the Epistle.
- The two church bells in Auvillars predate the French Revolution. It is not known how they came to be in this tower as they were part of the bells of Saint Germain in Lisieux. Here are the inscriptions they bear:
  - The year 1738 has been named Magdalaine Françoise by François Mignot, counsellor to the king, elected president of this town and noble lady Mary Magdalaine Moucel, the wife of Sir Alexander le Maignen, knight, lord of Houlbec and Castillon.
  - The year 1738 has been named Louise Nicolase by Nicolas Riquier de la Rosiere, adviser to the king in the election and by damsel Louise Gennevievre Dosmont, daughter of Sir Louis Dosmont, squire to Lord Malicorne of Mesnil-Poisson.

===== The cemetery =====
When the sanctuary was repaved in 1853, when the old tiles were removed a tombstone from the 15th or 16th century was discovered. This stone is topped by a statue of a priest holding an old chasuble, turned up at the shoulders with amict turned down. The head rests on a cushion with tassels held by angels. At the character's feet lies a dog gnawing a bone. Several parts of this tombstone have been mutilated but the statue is well preserved and perfectly sculpted, it was once under an arched arcade on the southern wall.

There are the remains of an old halo cross in the cemetery dating from the 17th century or perhaps as late as the end of the 16th century. On one side is represented Christ and on the other the Virgin Mary holding in her arms the Child Jesus. The lattice work is decorated with palm leaves.

Near the gate stands an old yew tree which is 4.1 metres in girth.

When the foundations of the sacristy were dug a sword was found at a depth of 2.5 metres that appears to date back to ancient times.

===== History =====
The church is under the patronage of Saint Germain. The parish was divided into two portions which were united around 1708 with provision for two priests: the two priests were both nominated by the Lord. The pouillé (Ecclesiastical register) of Lisieux shows that the Lord in the 14th century was dominus Robertus de Tournebut. There are many items in the church that are registered as historical objects:

- A tombstone of a cleric of Tournevu (14th century)
- A stained glass window (1890)
- A stained glass window of Saint Germain blessing Saint Genevieve (19th century)
- A baptismal font (18th century)
- An antependium (18th century)
- A processional cross (18th century)
- A cross (18th century)
- A processional banner (1887)
- A statue of the virgin called Sainte Apolline (17th century)
- A lectern (18th century)
- An altar candle (18th century)
- A pulpit (18th century)
- Two stained glass windows of the nativity and baptism of Christ (19th century)
- An antependium (1709)
- A monumental painting in the choir (19th century)
- A monumental painting of the crucifixion (19th century)
- A monumental painting in the chapel of angels (19th century)
- A group of mural paintings (19th century)
- A statue of the Virgin and Child (19th century)
- An altar tomb in the chapel (18th century)
- Two altars, retables, two antepedia, two statues: Saint Germain and Saint Bonaventure (17th century)
- Two statues: Saint Germain and Saint Exupère (17th century)
- The main altar (19th century)
- The main altar: tabernacle, retable (18th century)
- A stained glass window of the Virgin and Child, Saint John, Saint Jacques (14th century)

==== Chapel of Saint-Jean ====
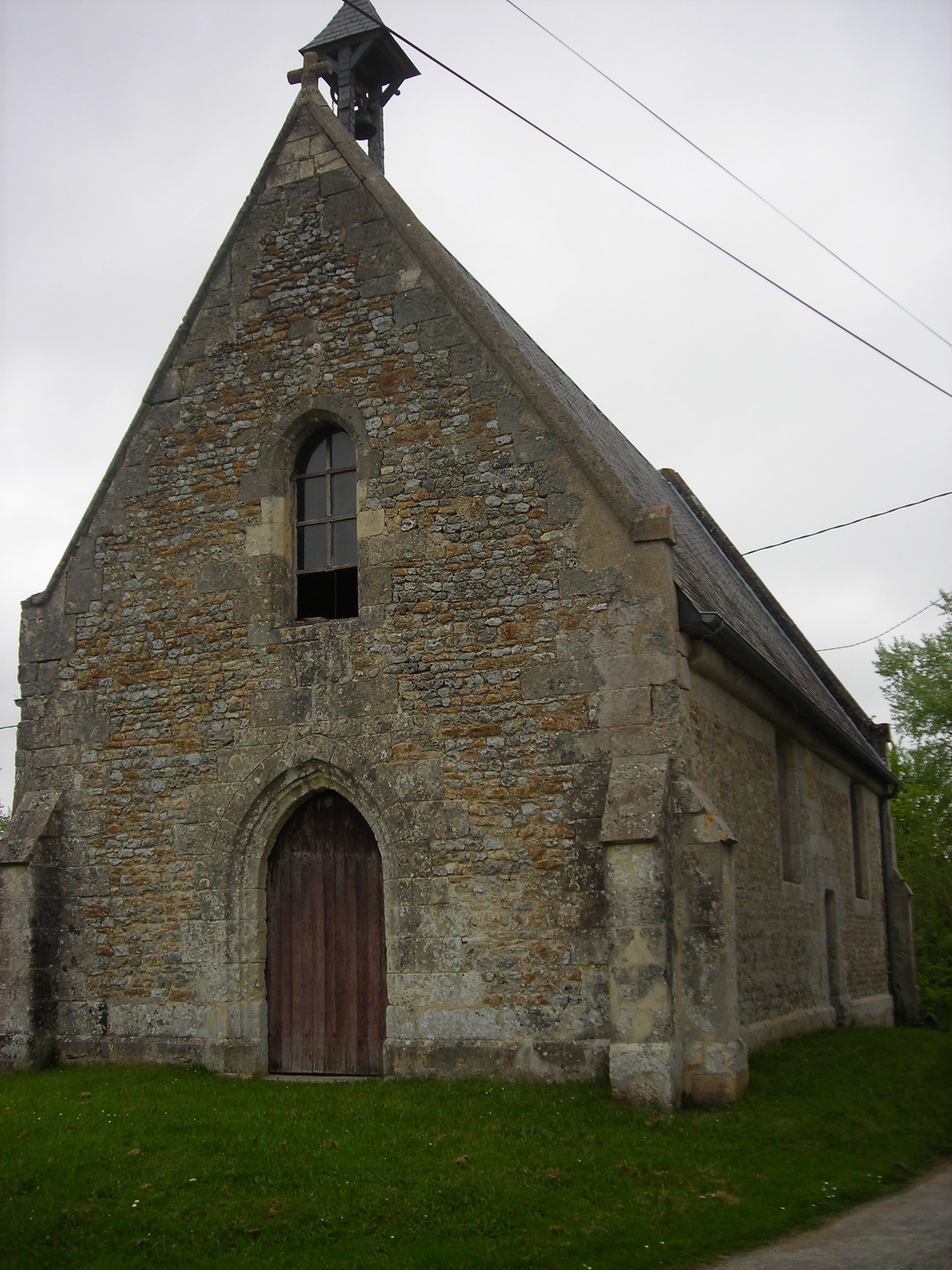
The Chapel of Saint-Jean

The Chapel of Saint-Jean stands on a hill 2 kilometres south of the Church of Auvillars. It dates to the last Flamboyant Gothic period and is about 30 feet long by 15 wide. The western gate, flanked by two buttresses, finishes with a very sharp curve which supports a very steep roof. The ogival doorway is decorated with prismatic mouldings and surmounted by a window from the same era. In front of the chapel there are two large poplar trees at the entrance.

The nave is lit by four windows: two full-arched with chamfer and the other two segmented arch. The walls are flanked by protruding buttresses and terminate in a quarter-round cornice.

The chevet on the right is flanked by two buttresses and finishes, as with the portal, with a very sloping curve surmounted by an antefix cross. On the southern wall are the remains of a funeral litre. The heraldic emblems painted on the liter are reproduced inside the chapel. On the side of the epistle there is an ogival pool.

Behind the altar are three niches containing old statues supported by corbels.

The vault of the chapel is paneled with tie beams.

There are several items in the chapel that are registered as historical objects:

- Three altar candlesticks (18th century)
- Three statues of Saint Mark, the Education of the Virgin, and the Virgin and Child (18th century)
- A statue of Saint John the Baptist (16th century)
- Two bas-reliefs of Saint John the Baptist and a priest praying (16th century)

==== The Parish Church of Saint-Philbert ====
The Parish Church of Saint-Philbert contains one item that is registered as an historical object:

- A stained glass window of the Virgin and Child (13th century)

== See also ==
- Communes of the Calvados department
