= Notre-Dame-d'Estrées =

Commune in Calvados, France

- Part of Notre-Dame-d'Estrées-Corbon
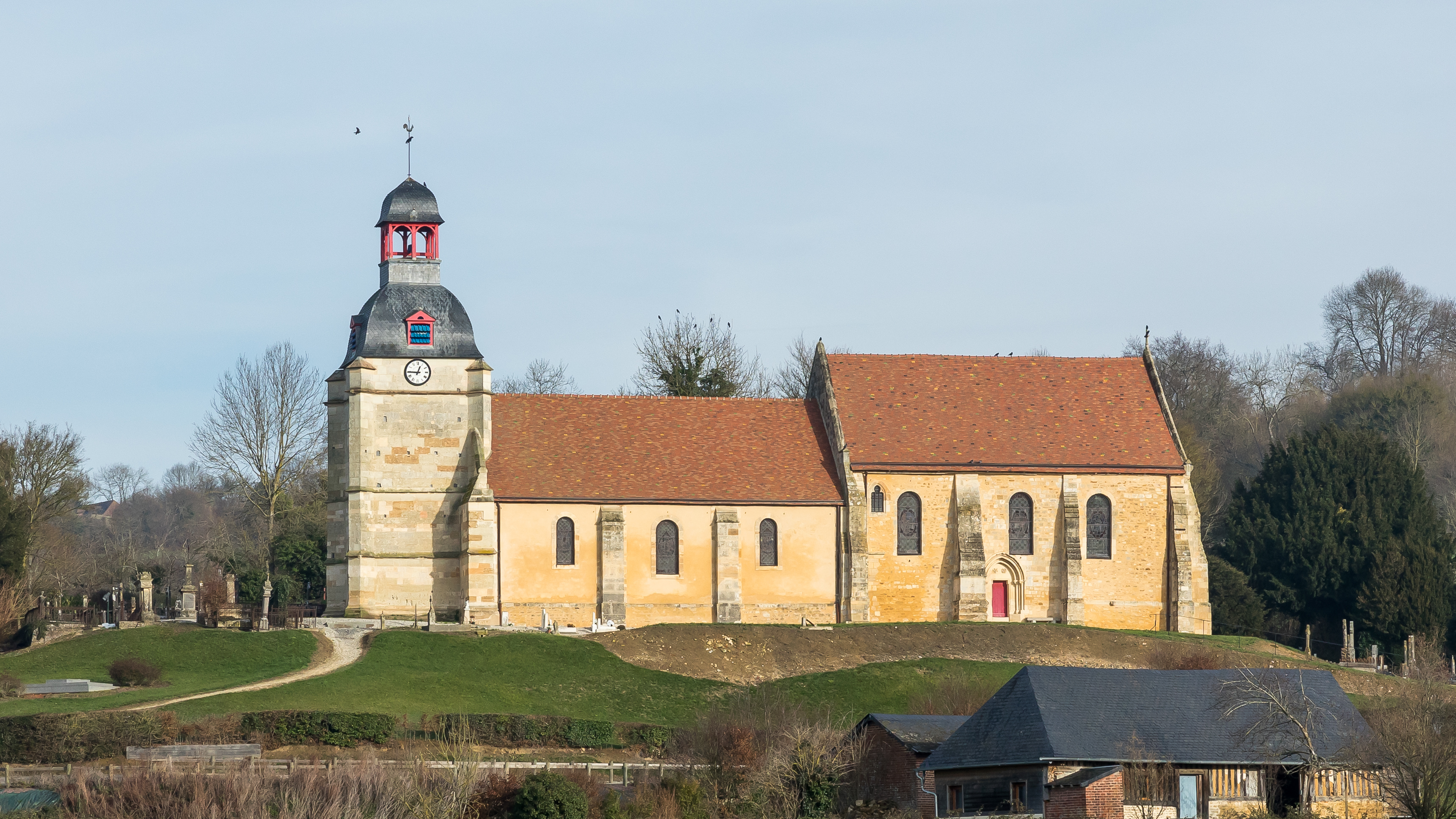
- The church
- Location of Notre-Dame-d'Estrées
- Location within France Location within Normandy
- Coordinates: 49°08′50″N 0°00′28″W
- Country: France
- Region: Normandy
- Department: Calvados
- Arrondissement: Lisieux
- Canton: Mézidon Vallée d'Auge
- Commune: Notre-Dame-d'Estrées-Corbon
- Area^{1}: 7.43 km^{2} (2.87 sq mi)
- Elevation: 40 m (130 ft)
- Highest elevation: 110 m (360 ft)
- Lowest elevation: 5 m (16 ft)
- Population (2019): 136
  - Density: 18.3/km^{2} (47.4/sq mi)
- Time zone: UTC+01:00 (CET)
  - Summer (DST): UTC+02:00 (CEST)
- Postal code: 14340
- ^{1} French Land Register data, which excludes lakes, ponds, glaciers > 1 km^{2} (0.386 sq mi or 247 acres) and river estuaries.

Notre-Dame-d'Estrées is a former commune in the department of Calvados in the Normandy region in northwestern France. In January 2015 it merged with the commune of Corbon to the new commune Notre-Dame-d'Estrées-Corbon.

== See also ==
- Communes of the Calvados department
