= Corbon =

Corbon may refer to:

- Corbon, Calvados, in the Calvados département, France
- Corbon, Orne, in the Orne département, France
- Cor-Bon/Glaser, an American manufacturer of small arms ammunition

== See also ==
- Carbon, an element in the periodic table
- Corbin (disambiguation)
