= Repentigny (disambiguation) =

Repentigny is an off-island suburb of Montreal, Quebec, Canada.

Repentigny may also refer to:

- Repentigny (federal electoral district), a Canadian electoral district taking in the Repentigny, Quebec area
- Repentigny (provincial electoral district), a Quebec electoral district taking in the Repentigny, Quebec area
- Repentigny, Calvados, a commune of the département of Calvados, in France
