= Bissières =

Commune in Calvados, France

- Part of Méry-Bissières-en-Auge
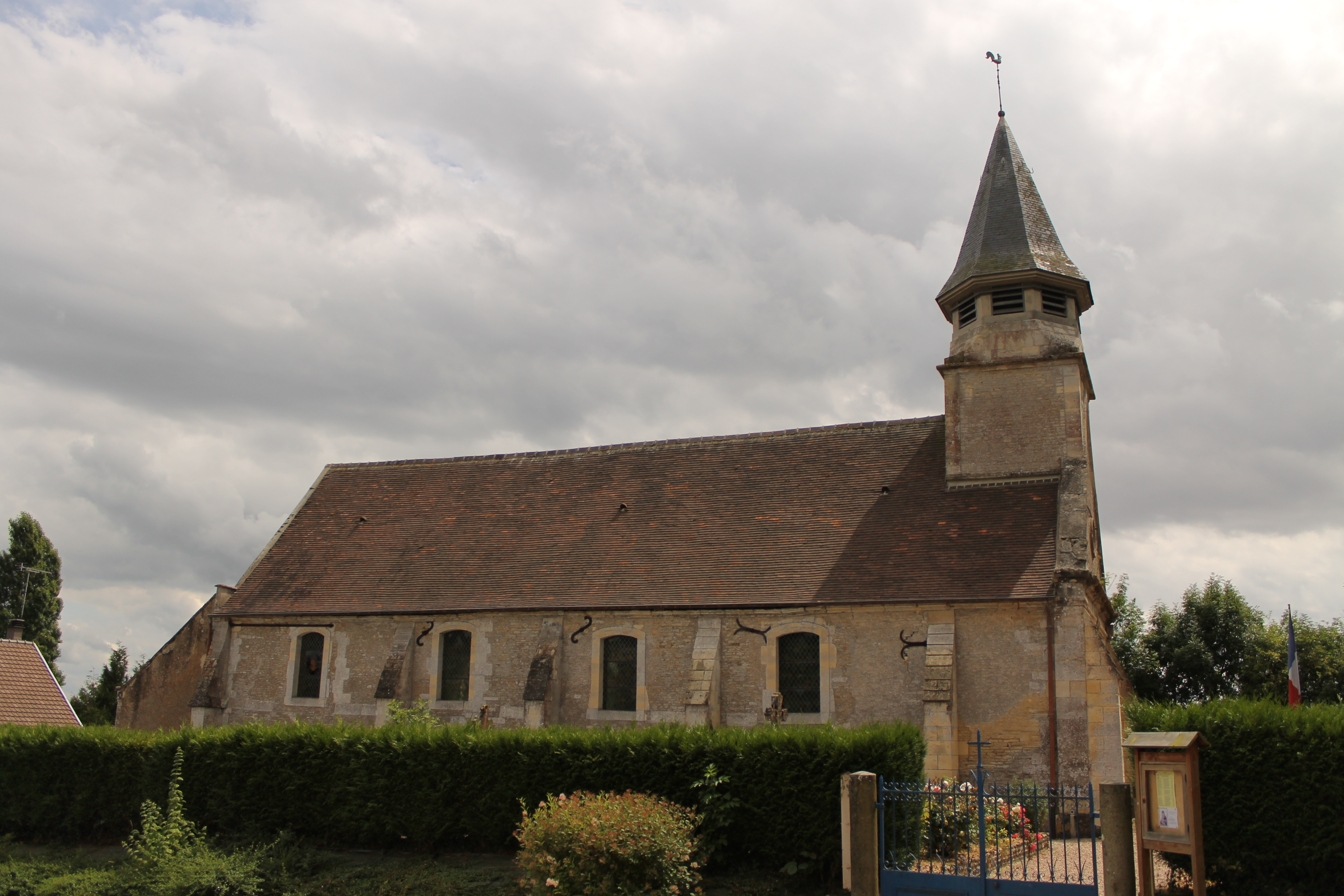

- Coat of arms
- Location of Bissières
- Location within France Location within Normandy
- Coordinates: 49°06′49″N 0°05′35″W
- Country: France
- Region: Normandy
- Department: Calvados
- Arrondissement: Lisieux
- Canton: Mézidon Vallée d'Auge
- Commune: Méry-Bissières-en-Auge
- Area^{1}: 1.55 km^{2} (0.60 sq mi)
- Elevation: 15 m (49 ft)
- Highest elevation: 50 m (160 ft)
- Lowest elevation: 13 m (43 ft)
- Population (2019): 175
  - Density: 113/km^{2} (292/sq mi)
- Time zone: UTC+01:00 (CET)
  - Summer (DST): UTC+02:00 (CEST)
- Postal code: 14370
- ^{1} French Land Register data, which excludes lakes, ponds, glaciers > 1 km^{2} (0.386 sq mi or 247 acres) and river estuaries.

Bissières (French pronunciation: [bisjɛʁ]) is a former commune in the Calvados department in the Normandy region in northwestern France. On 1 January 2017, it was merged into the new commune Méry-Bissières-en-Auge.

== See also ==
- Communes of the Calvados department
