= Victot-Pontfol =

- Part of Victot-en-Auge
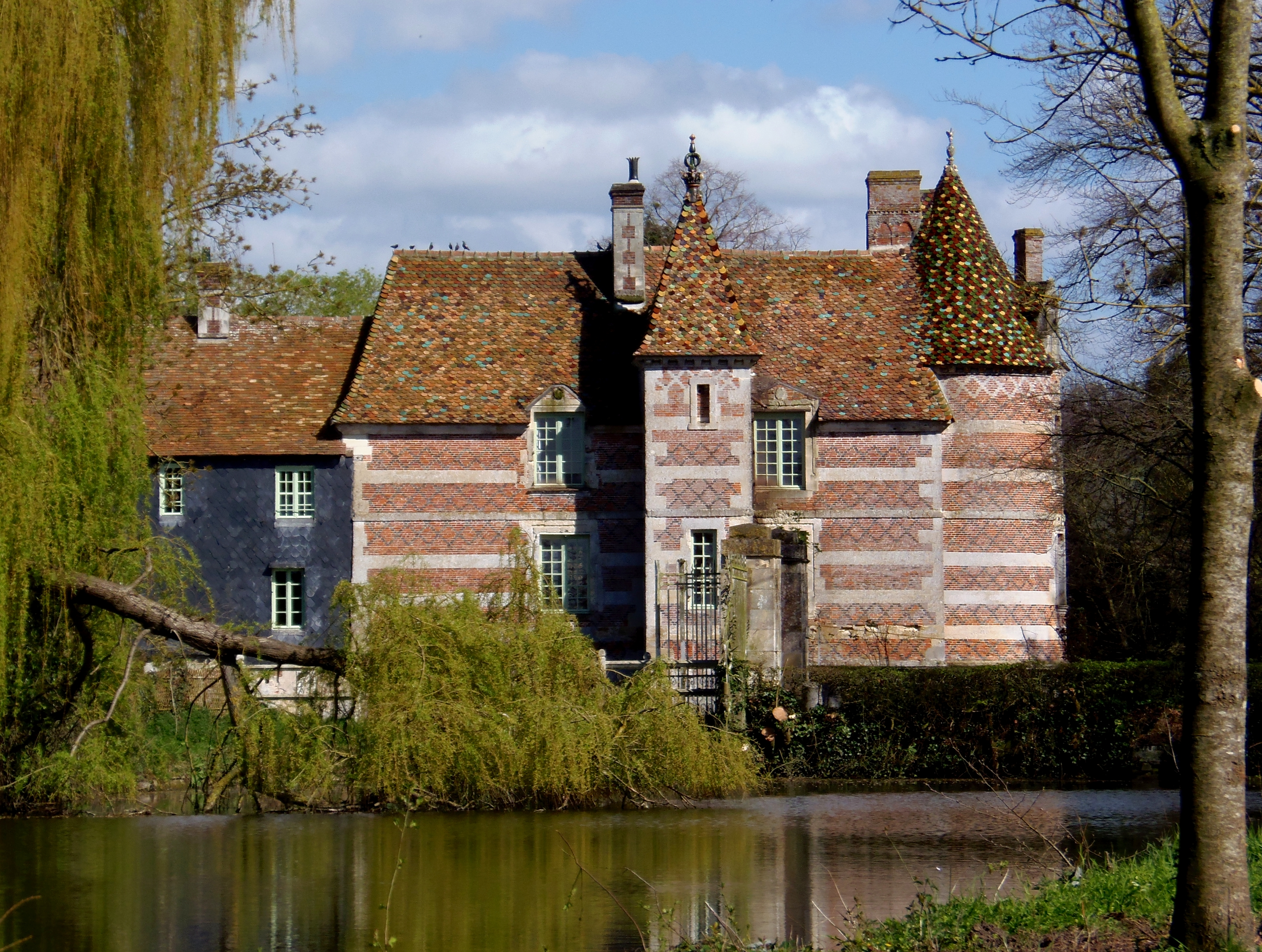
- The chateau in Victot
- Location of Victot-Pontfol
- Location within France Location within Normandy
- Coordinates: 49°09′50″N 0°00′55″W
- Country: France
- Region: Normandy
- Department: Calvados
- Arrondissement: Lisieux
- Canton: Mézidon Vallée d'Auge
- Commune: Victot-en-Auge
- Area^{1}: 10.66 km^{2} (4.12 sq mi)
- Elevation: 50 m (160 ft)
- Highest elevation: 127 m (417 ft)
- Lowest elevation: 7 m (23 ft)
- Population (2023): 94
  - Density: 8.8/km^{2} (23/sq mi)
- Time zone: UTC+01:00 (CET)
  - Summer (DST): UTC+02:00 (CEST)
- Postal code: 14430
- ^{1} French Land Register data, which excludes lakes, ponds, glaciers > 1 km^{2} (0.386 sq mi or 247 acres) and river estuaries.

Victot-Pontfol (French pronunciation: [vikto pɔ̃fɔl]) is a former commune in the Calvados department in the Normandy region in northwestern France. It was merged with Gerrots to form Victot-en-Auge on 1 January 2025.

== See also ==
- Communes of the Calvados department
