= Gerrots =

- Part of Victot-en-Auge
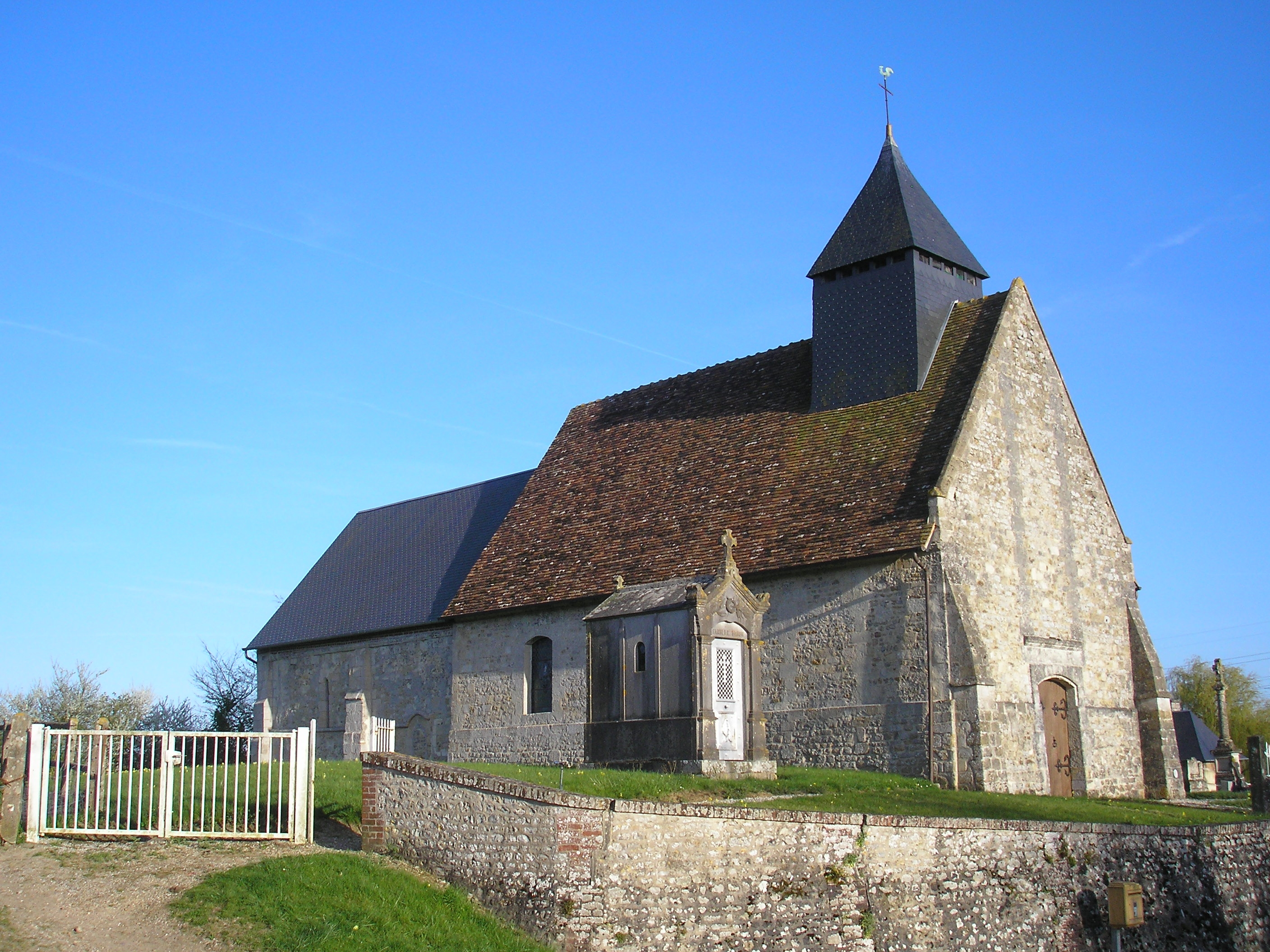
- The church in Gerrots
- Location of Gerrots
- Location within France Location within Normandy
- Coordinates: 49°11′37″N 0°00′14″W
- Country: France
- Region: Normandy
- Department: Calvados
- Arrondissement: Lisieux
- Canton: Mézidon Vallée d'Auge
- Commune: Victot-en-Auge
- Area^{1}: 3.48 km^{2} (1.34 sq mi)
- Elevation: 32 m (105 ft)
- Highest elevation: 123 m (404 ft)
- Lowest elevation: 16 m (52 ft)
- Population (2022): 51
  - Density: 15/km^{2} (38/sq mi)
- Time zone: UTC+01:00 (CET)
  - Summer (DST): UTC+02:00 (CEST)
- Postal code: 14430
- ^{1} French Land Register data, which excludes lakes, ponds, glaciers > 1 km^{2} (0.386 sq mi or 247 acres) and river estuaries.

Gerrots (French pronunciation: [ʒɛʁo]) is a former commune in the Calvados department in the Normandy region in northwestern France. It was merged with Victot-Pontfol to form Victot-en-Auge on 1 January 2025.

== Population ==
Historical population
Year	Pop.	±% p.a.
1968	38	—
1975	40	+0.74%
1982	45	+1.70%
1990	44	−0.28%
1999	37	−1.91%
2009	55	+4.04%
2014	54	−0.37%
2020	51	−0.95%
Source: INSEE

== See also ==
- Communes of the Calvados department
