= Saint-Laurent-du-Mont =

- Part of Cambremer
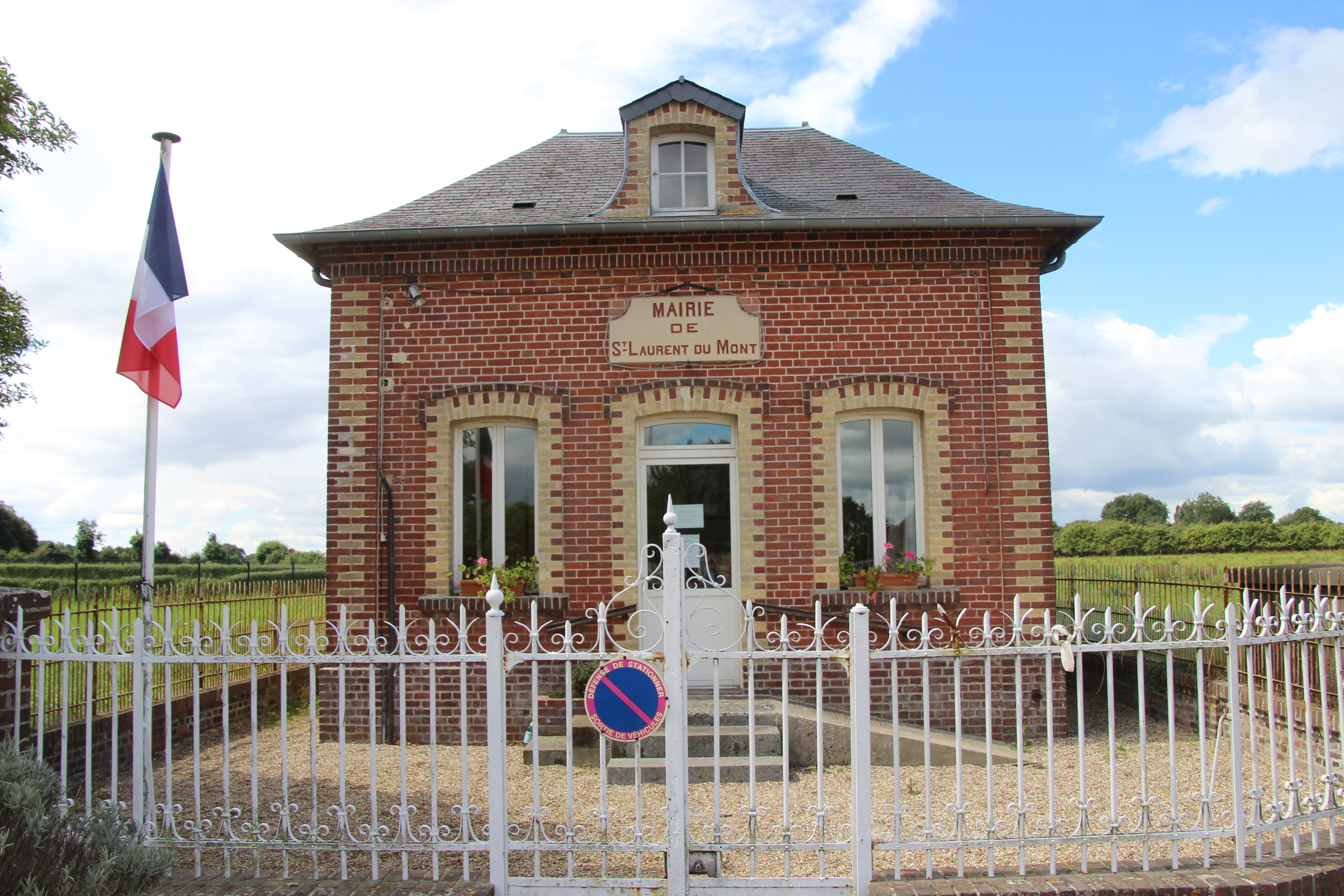
- The town hall in Saint-Laurent-du-Mont

- Coat of arms
- Location of Saint-Laurent-du-Mont
- Location within France Location within Normandy
- Coordinates: 49°08′29″N 0°02′14″E
- Country: France
- Region: Normandy
- Department: Calvados
- Arrondissement: Lisieux
- Canton: Mézidon Vallée d'Auge
- Commune: Cambremer
- Area^{1}: 3.48 km^{2} (1.34 sq mi)
- Elevation: 145 m (476 ft)
- Highest elevation: 149 m (489 ft)
- Lowest elevation: 20 m (66 ft)
- Population (2016): 189
  - Density: 54.3/km^{2} (141/sq mi)
- Time zone: UTC+01:00 (CET)
  - Summer (DST): UTC+02:00 (CEST)
- Postal code: 14340
- ^{1} French Land Register data, which excludes lakes, ponds, glaciers > 1 km^{2} (0.386 sq mi or 247 acres) and river estuaries.

Saint-Laurent-du-Mont (French pronunciation: [sɛ̃ loʁɑ̃ dy mɔ̃]) is a former commune in the Calvados department in the Normandy region in northwestern France. On 1 January 2019, it was merged into the commune Cambremer.

== See also ==
- Communes of the Calvados department
