= Le Fournet =

- Commune
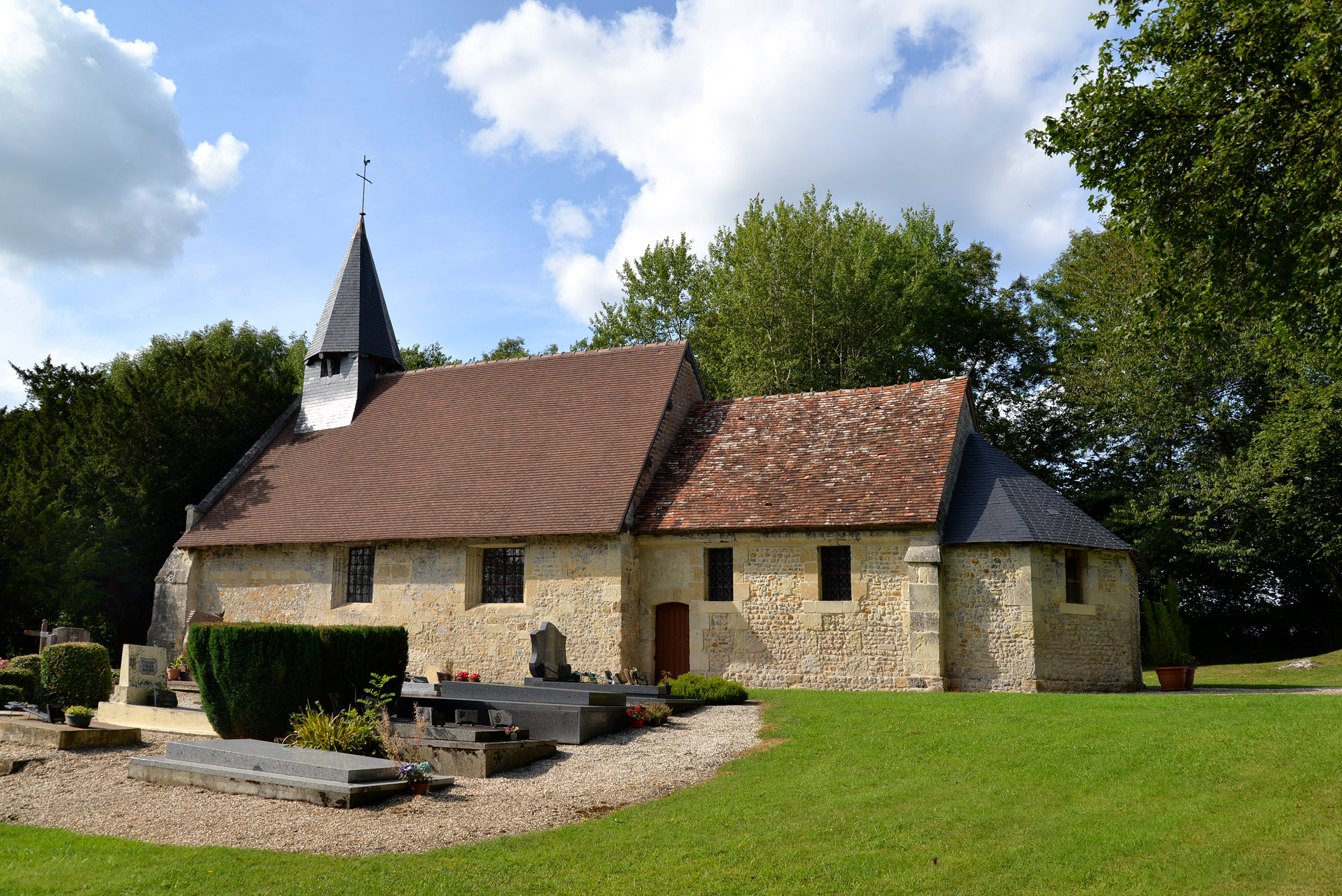
- The church in Le Fournet

- Coat of arms
- Location of Le Fournet
- Location within France Location within Normandy
- Coordinates: 49°12′15″N 0°06′34″E
- Country: France
- Region: Normandy
- Department: Calvados
- Arrondissement: Lisieux
- Canton: Mézidon Vallée d'Auge
- Intercommunality: CC Terre d'Auge

Government
  - Mayor (2020–2026): Céline Maheut
- Area^{1}: 2.99 km^{2} (1.15 sq mi)
- Elevation: 150 m (490 ft)
- Highest elevation: 154 m (505 ft)
- Lowest elevation: 85 m (279 ft)
- Population (2023): 77
  - Density: 26/km^{2} (67/sq mi)
- Time zone: UTC+01:00 (CET)
  - Summer (DST): UTC+02:00 (CEST)
- INSEE/Postal code: 14285 /14340
- ^{1} French Land Register data, which excludes lakes, ponds, glaciers > 1 km^{2} (0.386 sq mi or 247 acres) and river estuaries.

Le Fournet (French pronunciation: [lə fuʁnɛ]) is a commune in the Calvados department in the Normandy region in northwestern France.

== Population ==
Historical population
Year	Pop.	±% p.a.
1968	38	—
1975	38	+0.00%
1982	31	−2.87%
1990	43	+4.17%
1999	43	+0.00%
2007	50	+1.90%
2012	56	+2.29%
2017	62	+2.06%
2023	77	+3.68%
Source: INSEE

== See also ==
- Communes of the Calvados department
