= Castillon-en-Auge =

- Commune
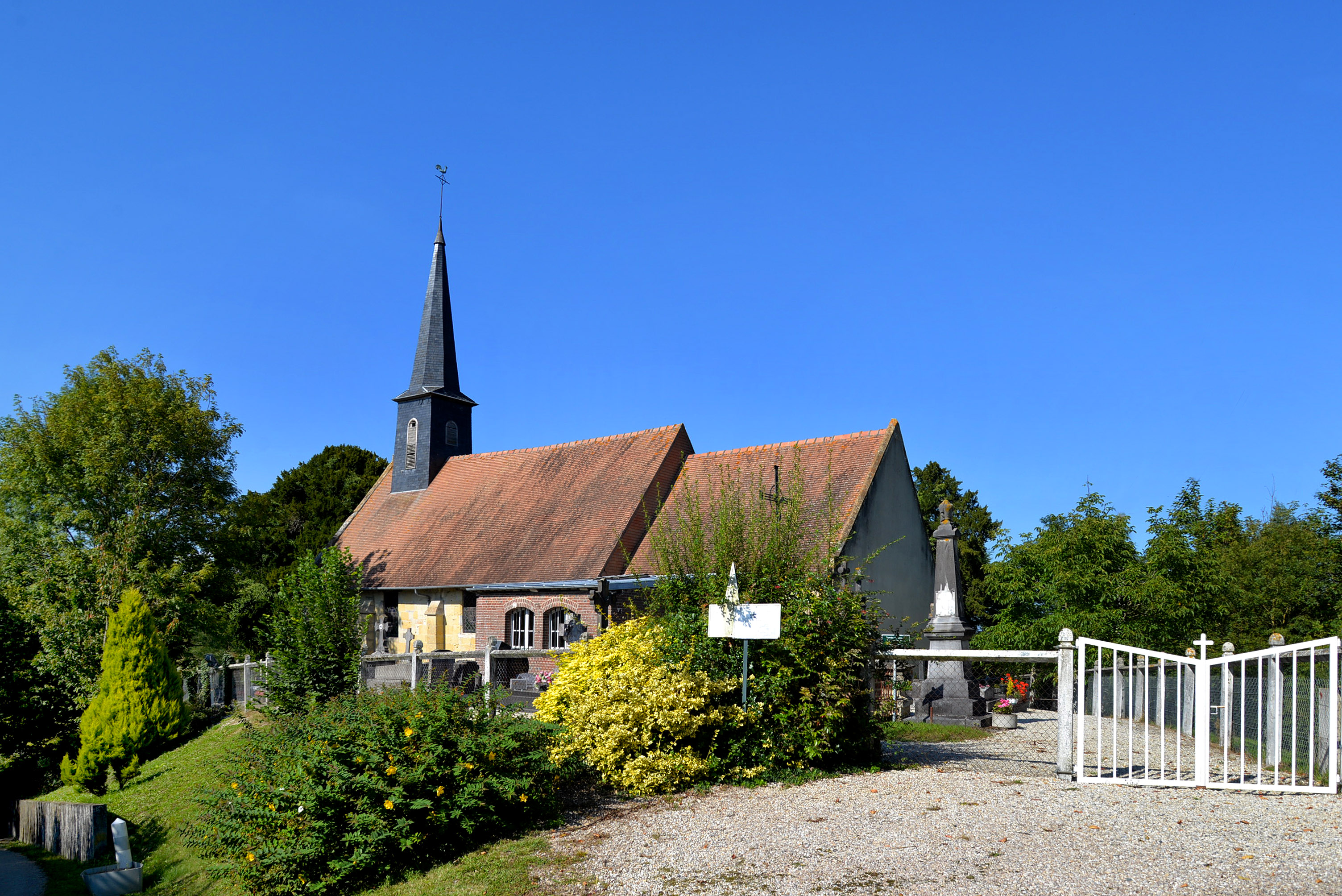
- The church in Castillon-en-Auge
- Location of Castillon-en-Auge
- Location within France Location within Normandy
- Coordinates: 49°01′52″N 0°05′42″E
- Country: France
- Region: Normandy
- Department: Calvados
- Arrondissement: Lisieux
- Canton: Mézidon Vallée d'Auge
- Intercommunality: CA Lisieux Normandie

Government
  - Mayor (2020–2026): Gérard Vacquerel
- Area^{1}: 7.23 km^{2} (2.79 sq mi)
- Elevation: 155 m (509 ft)
- Highest elevation: 170 m (560 ft)
- Lowest elevation: 49 m (161 ft)
- Population (2023): 166
  - Density: 23.0/km^{2} (59.5/sq mi)
- Time zone: UTC+01:00 (CET)
  - Summer (DST): UTC+02:00 (CEST)
- INSEE/Postal code: 14141 /14140
- ^{1} French Land Register data, which excludes lakes, ponds, glaciers > 1 km^{2} (0.386 sq mi or 247 acres) and river estuaries.

Castillon-en-Auge (French pronunciation: [kastijɔ̃ ɑ̃.n‿oʒ], literally Castillon in Auge) is a commune in the Calvados department and Normandy region of north-western France.

== Geography ==
=== Climate ===
In 2010, the climate of the commune was a Type 5, according to a CNRS study based on a series of data covering the period 1971–2000. In 2020, Météo-France published a typology of the climates of metropolitan France in which the commune is exposed to an oceanic climate and is in the Normandy (Cotentin, Orne) climatic region, characterized by relatively high rainfall (850 mm/a) and a cool (15.5 °C) and windy summer.

For 1971–2000, the mean annual temperature is 10.3 °C, with an annual temperature range of 13 °C. The average annual rainfall total is 806 mm, with 12.2 days of precipitation in January and 8.1 days in July. For 1991–2020, the average annual temperature observed at the nearest weather station, located in the commune of Saint-Pierre-en-Auge, 9 km away per great circle navigation, is 11.3 °C and the mean annual total precipitation is 677.1 mm. For the future, the municipality's climate parameters estimated for 2050 according to different greenhouse gas emission scenarios can be consulted on a dedicated website published by Météo-France in November 2022.

== Urban planning ==
=== Typology ===
As of 1 January 2024, Castillon-en-Auge is categorised as a rural commune with a widely dispersed population, according to the new 7-level municipal density grid defined by INSEE in 2022. It is located outside the urban unit. In addition, the commune is part of the Lisieux catchment area, of which it is a crown commune. (Note: In October 2020, the concept of functional areas replaced the old concept of urban areas, to allow consistent comparisons with other countries of the European Union.) This area, which includes 57 municipalities, is categorized as an area of 50,000 to less than 200,000 inhabitants.

=== Land use ===
The land use of the municipality, as shown by the European biophysical land cover database Corine Land Cover, is marked by the importance of agricultural land (93.8% in 2018), a proportion identical to that of 1990 (93.8%). The detailed breakdown in 2018 is as follows: grassland (80.4%), arable land (13.4%), forests (6.2%). The evolution of the land use of the commune and its infrastructures can be observed on the various cartographic representations of the territory: the Cassini map (18th century), the staff map (1820-1866) and the IGN maps or aerial photos for the current period (1950 to today).

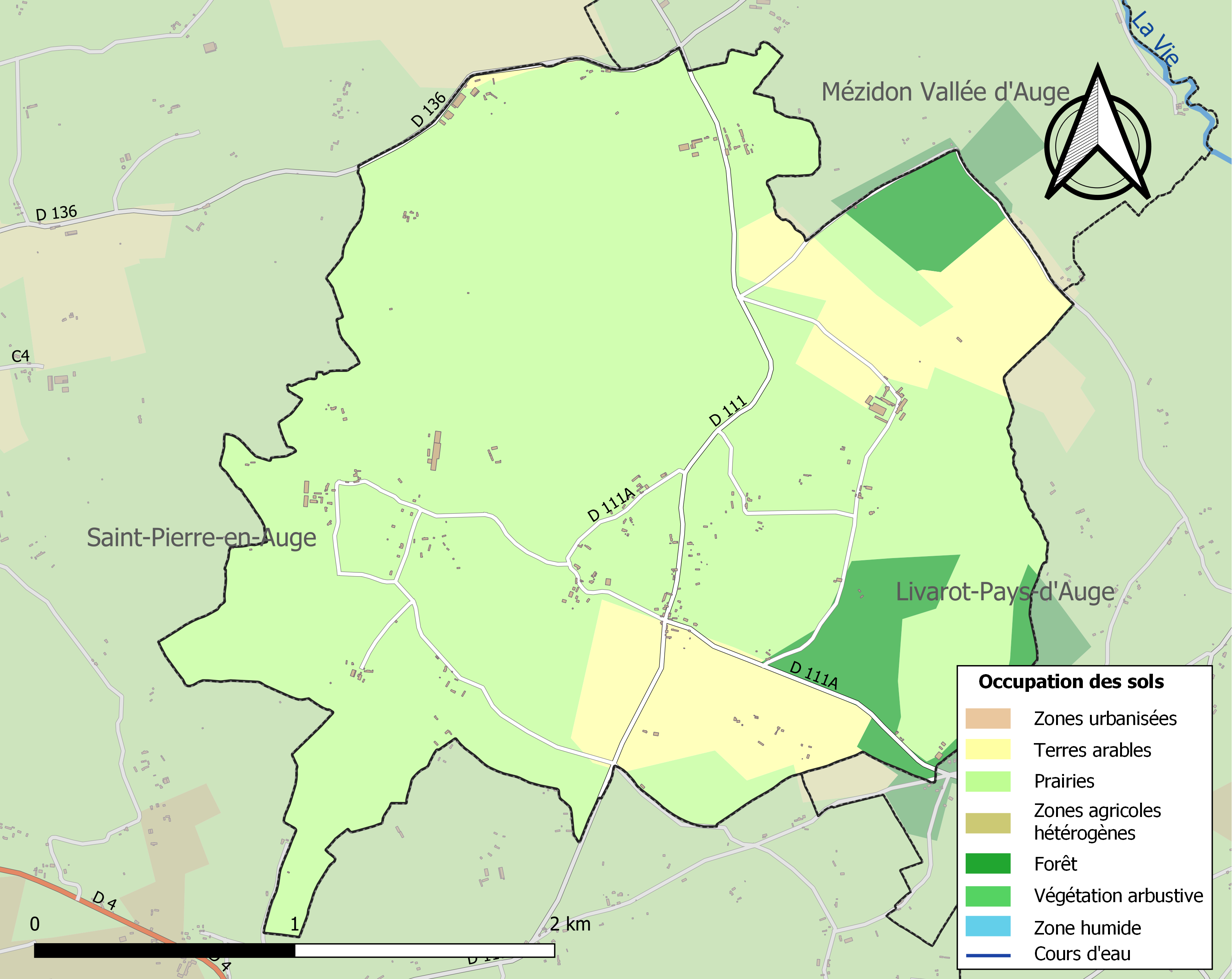
Map of the municipality's infrastructure and land use in 2018 (CLC).

== Population ==
Historical population
Year	Pop.	±% p.a.
1968	119	—
1975	120	+0.12%
1982	101	−2.43%
1990	101	+0.00%
1999	130	+2.84%
2007	141	+1.02%
2012	166	+3.32%
2017	166	+0.00%
2023	166	+0.00%
Source: INSEE

== See also ==
- Communes of the Calvados department
