= Méry-Corbon =

- Part of Méry-Bissières-en-Auge
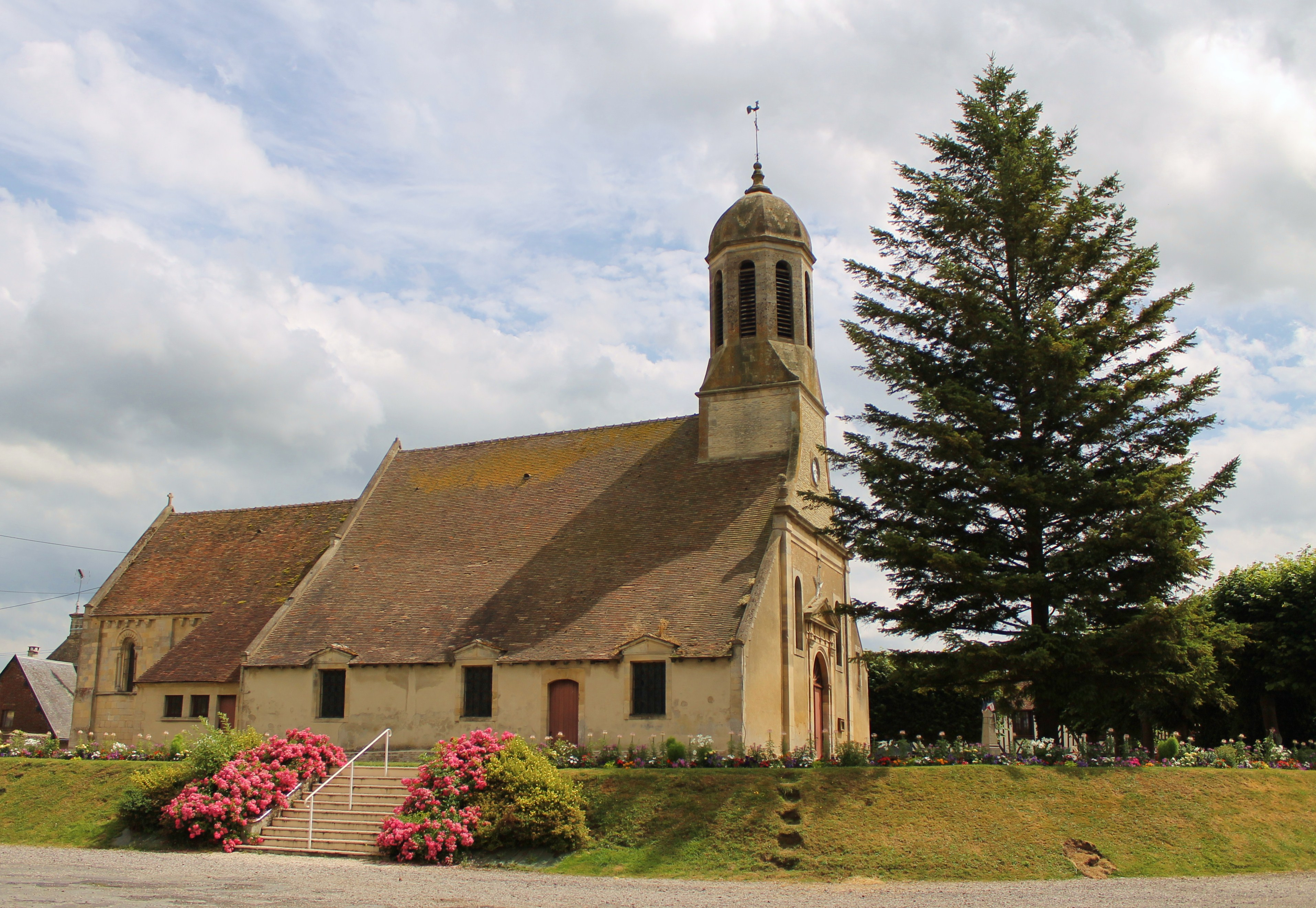

- Coat of arms
- Location of Méry-Corbon
- Location within France Location within Normandy
- Coordinates: 49°08′09″N 0°04′57″W
- Country: France
- Region: Normandy
- Department: Calvados
- Arrondissement: Lisieux
- Canton: Mézidon Vallée d'Auge
- Commune: Méry-Bissières-en-Auge
- Area^{1}: 7.57 km^{2} (2.92 sq mi)
- Elevation: 10 m (33 ft)
- Highest elevation: 37 m (121 ft)
- Lowest elevation: 4 m (13 ft)
- Population (2019): 905
  - Density: 120/km^{2} (310/sq mi)
- Time zone: UTC+01:00 (CET)
  - Summer (DST): UTC+02:00 (CEST)
- Postal code: 14370
- ^{1} French Land Register data, which excludes lakes, ponds, glaciers > 1 km^{2} (0.386 sq mi or 247 acres) and river estuaries.

Méry-Corbon (French pronunciation: [meʁi kɔʁbɔ̃]) is a former commune in the Calvados department in the Normandy region in northwestern France. On 1 January 2017, it was merged into the new commune Méry-Bissières-en-Auge.

== Population ==
Historical population
Year	Pop.	±% p.a.
1962	551	—
1968	556	+0.15%
1975	587	+0.78%
1982	621	+0.81%
1990	873	+4.35%
1999	835	−0.49%
2008	814	−0.28%
2019	905	+0.97%
Source: EHESS and INSEE

== See also ==
- Communes of the Calvados department
