= Valsemé =

- Commune
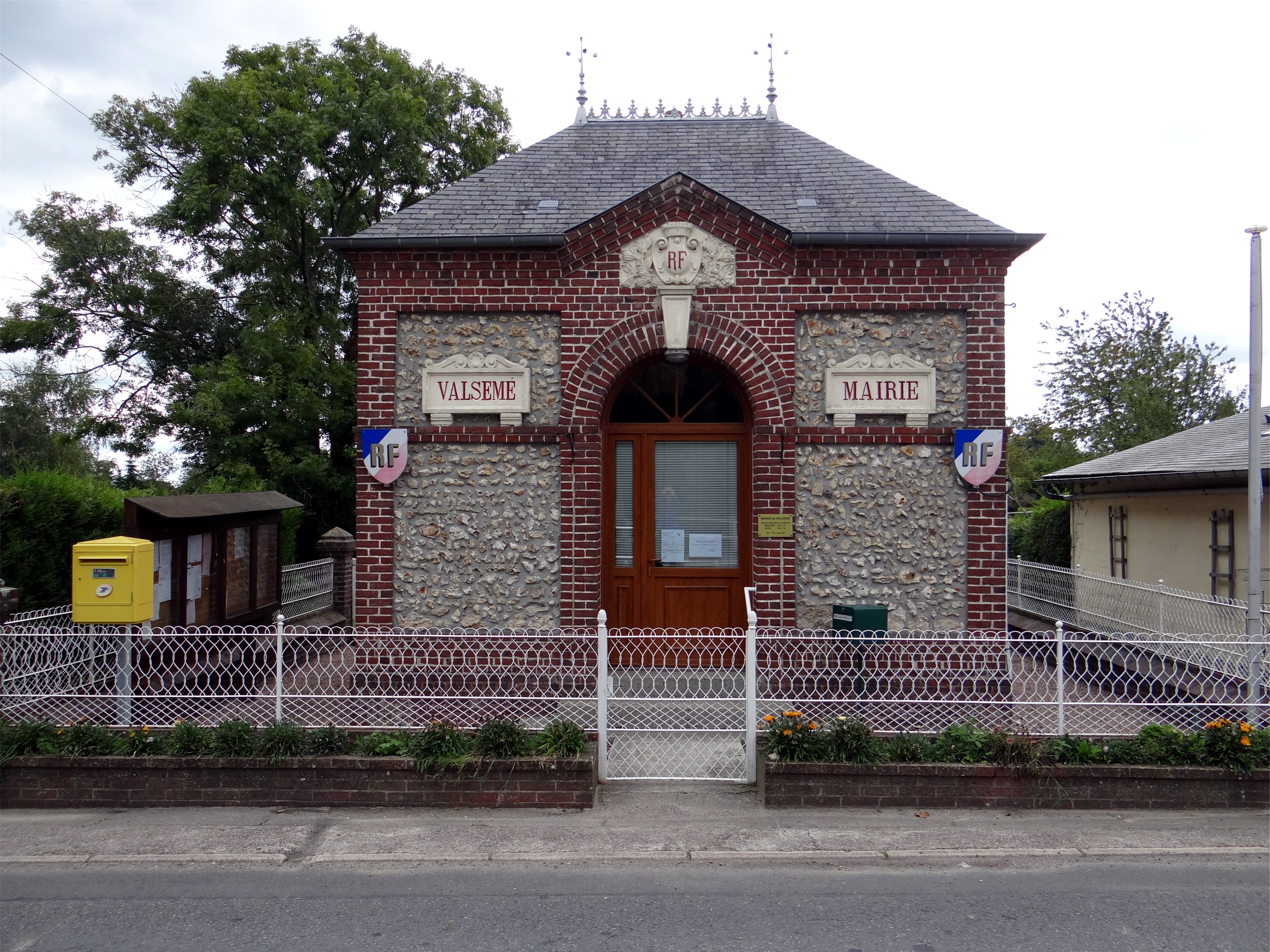
- The town hall in Valsemé
- Location of Valsemé
- Location within France Location within Normandy
- Coordinates: 49°14′10″N 0°05′54″E
- Country: France
- Region: Normandy
- Department: Calvados
- Arrondissement: Lisieux
- Canton: Mézidon Vallée d'Auge
- Intercommunality: CC Terre d'Auge

Government
  - Mayor (2020–2026): Thierry Langlois
- Area^{1}: 5.62 km^{2} (2.17 sq mi)
- Elevation: 150 m (490 ft)
- Highest elevation: 156 m (512 ft)
- Lowest elevation: 75 m (246 ft)
- Population (2023): 261
  - Density: 46.4/km^{2} (120/sq mi)
- Time zone: UTC+01:00 (CET)
  - Summer (DST): UTC+02:00 (CEST)
- INSEE/Postal code: 14723 /14340
- ^{1} French Land Register data, which excludes lakes, ponds, glaciers > 1 km^{2} (0.386 sq mi or 247 acres) and river estuaries.

Valsemé (French pronunciation: [valsəme]) is a commune in the Calvados department in the Normandy region in northwestern France.

== Population ==
Historical population
Year	Pop.	±% p.a.
1968	143	—
1975	121	−2.36%
1982	129	+0.92%
1990	184	+4.54%
1999	247	+3.33%
2007	271	+1.17%
2012	282	+0.80%
2017	276	−0.43%
2023	261	−0.93%
Source: INSEE

== See also ==
- Communes of the Calvados department
