= Notre-Dame-d'Estrées-Corbon =

- Commune
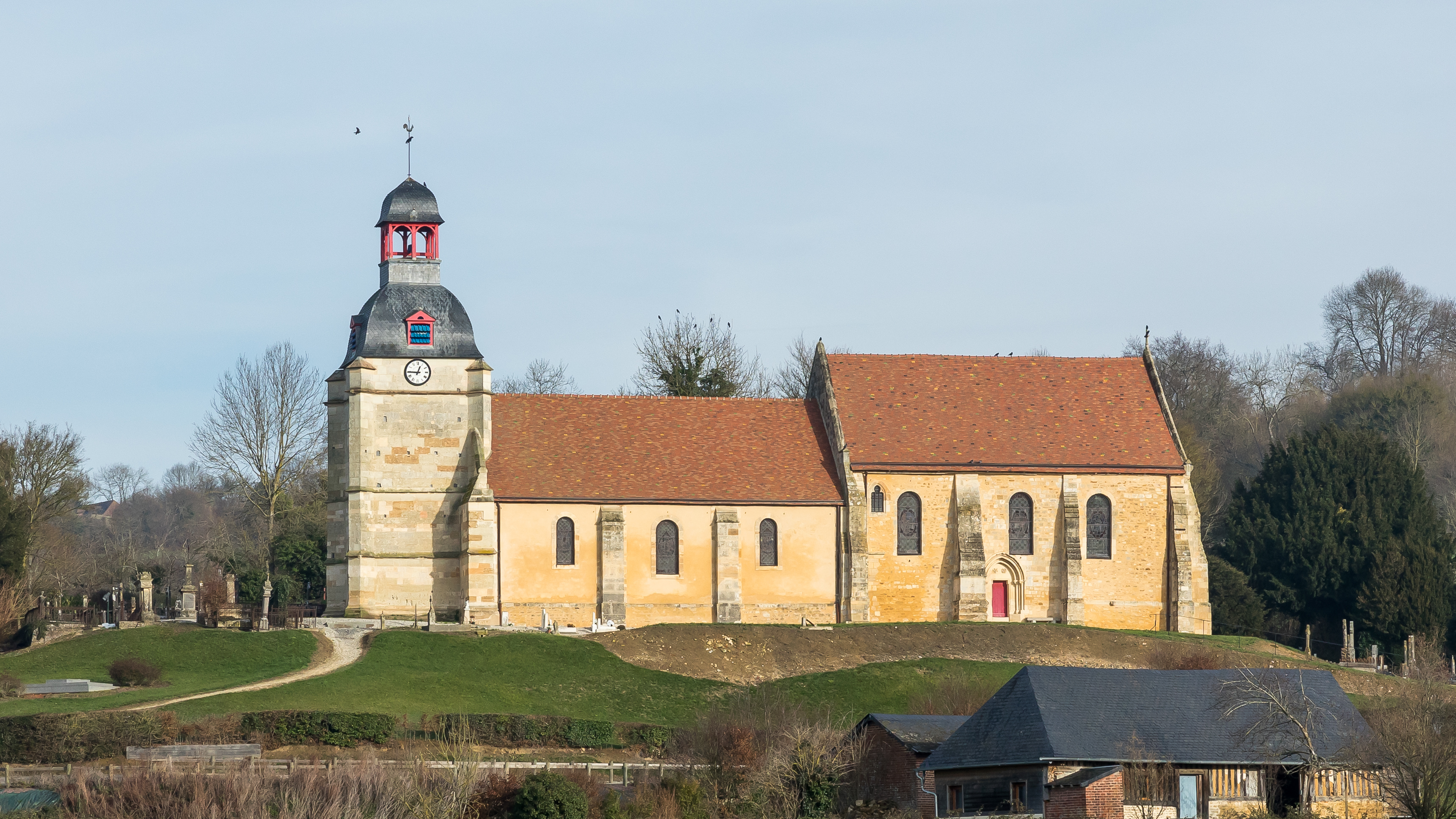
- The church in Notre-Dame-d'Estrées
- Location of Notre-Dame-d'Estrées-Corbon
- Location within France Location within Normandy
- Coordinates: 49°08′50″N 0°00′28″W
- Country: France
- Region: Normandy
- Department: Calvados
- Arrondissement: Lisieux
- Canton: Mézidon Vallée d'Auge
- Intercommunality: CA Lisieux Normandie
- Area^{1}: 11.52 km^{2} (4.45 sq mi)
- Elevation: 40 m (130 ft)
- Highest elevation: 110 m (360 ft)
- Lowest elevation: 5 m (16 ft)
- Population (2023): 185
  - Density: 16.1/km^{2} (41.6/sq mi)
- Time zone: UTC+01:00 (CET)
  - Summer (DST): UTC+02:00 (CEST)
- INSEE/Postal code: 14474 /14340
- ^{1} French Land Register data, which excludes lakes, ponds, glaciers > 1 km^{2} (0.386 sq mi or 247 acres) and river estuaries.

Notre-Dame-d'Estrées-Corbon is a commune in the department of Calvados in the Normandy region in northwestern France. It was formed in January 2015 by the merger of the communes of Corbon and Notre-Dame-d'Estrées.

== See also ==
- Communes of the Calvados department
