= La Roque-Baignard =

- Commune
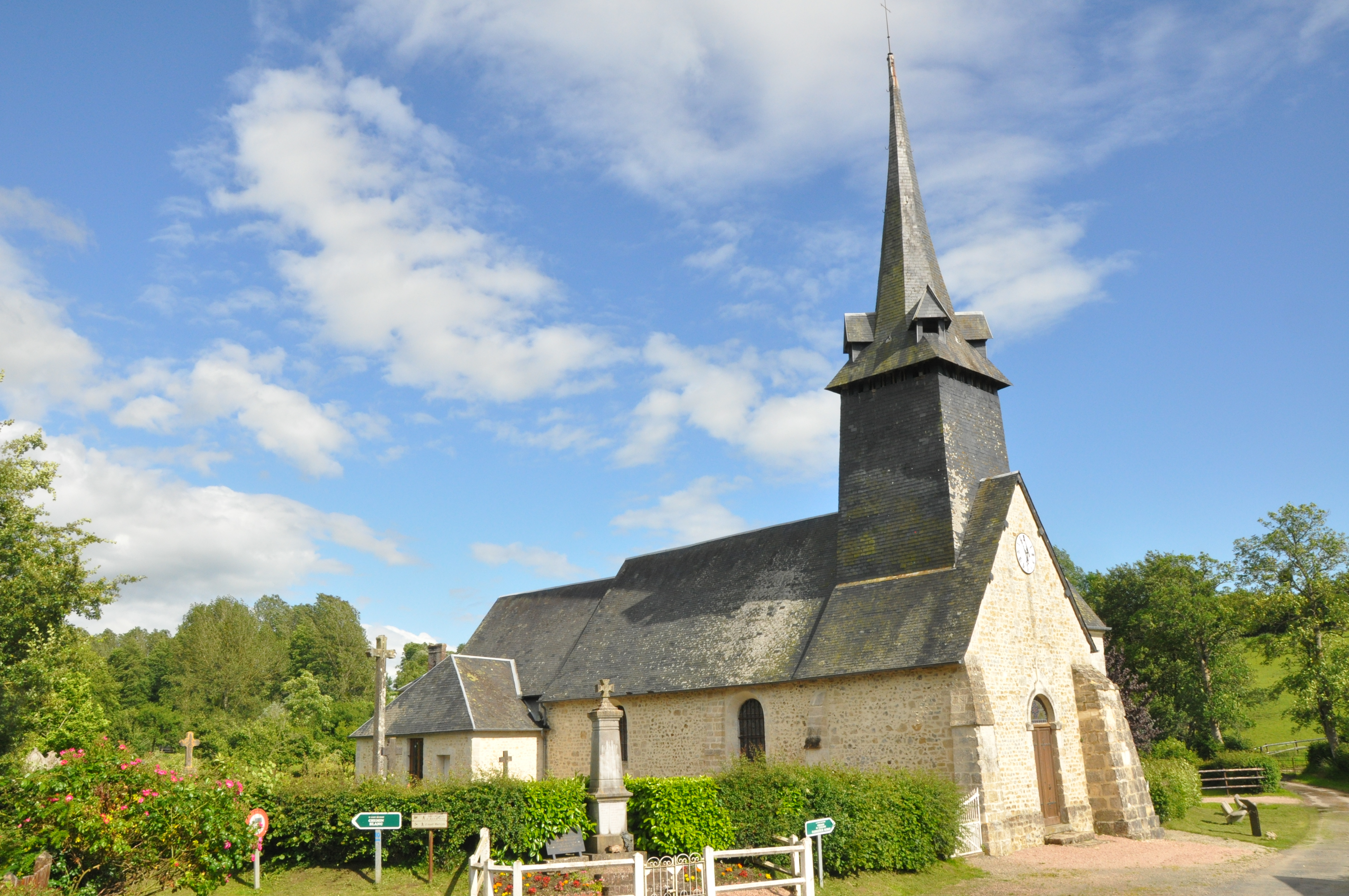
- The church in La Roque-Baignard
- Location of La Roque-Baignard
- Location within France Location within Normandy
- Coordinates: 49°10′47″N 0°06′00″E
- Country: France
- Region: Normandy
- Department: Calvados
- Arrondissement: Lisieux
- Canton: Mézidon Vallée d'Auge
- Intercommunality: CC Terre d'Auge

Government
  - Mayor (2020–2026): Edwige Anquetil
- Area^{1}: 4.64 km^{2} (1.79 sq mi)
- Elevation: 60 m (200 ft)
- Highest elevation: 156 m (512 ft)
- Lowest elevation: 51 m (167 ft)
- Population (2023): 104
  - Density: 22.4/km^{2} (58.1/sq mi)
- Time zone: UTC+01:00 (CET)
  - Summer (DST): UTC+02:00 (CEST)
- INSEE/Postal code: 14541 /14340
- ^{1} French Land Register data, which excludes lakes, ponds, glaciers > 1 km^{2} (0.386 sq mi or 247 acres) and river estuaries.

La Roque-Baignard (French pronunciation: [la ʁɔk bɛɲaʁ]) is a commune in the Calvados department in the Normandy region in northwestern France.

== Population ==
Historical population
Year	Pop.	±% p.a.
1968	87	—
1975	67	−3.66%
1982	57	−2.28%
1990	93	+6.31%
1999	116	+2.49%
2007	129	+1.34%
2012	108	−3.49%
2017	118	+1.79%
2023	104	−2.08%
Source: INSEE

== Personalities ==
André Gide was mayor of La Roque-Baignard in 1896.

== See also ==
- Communes of the Calvados department
