= Victot-en-Auge =

- Commune
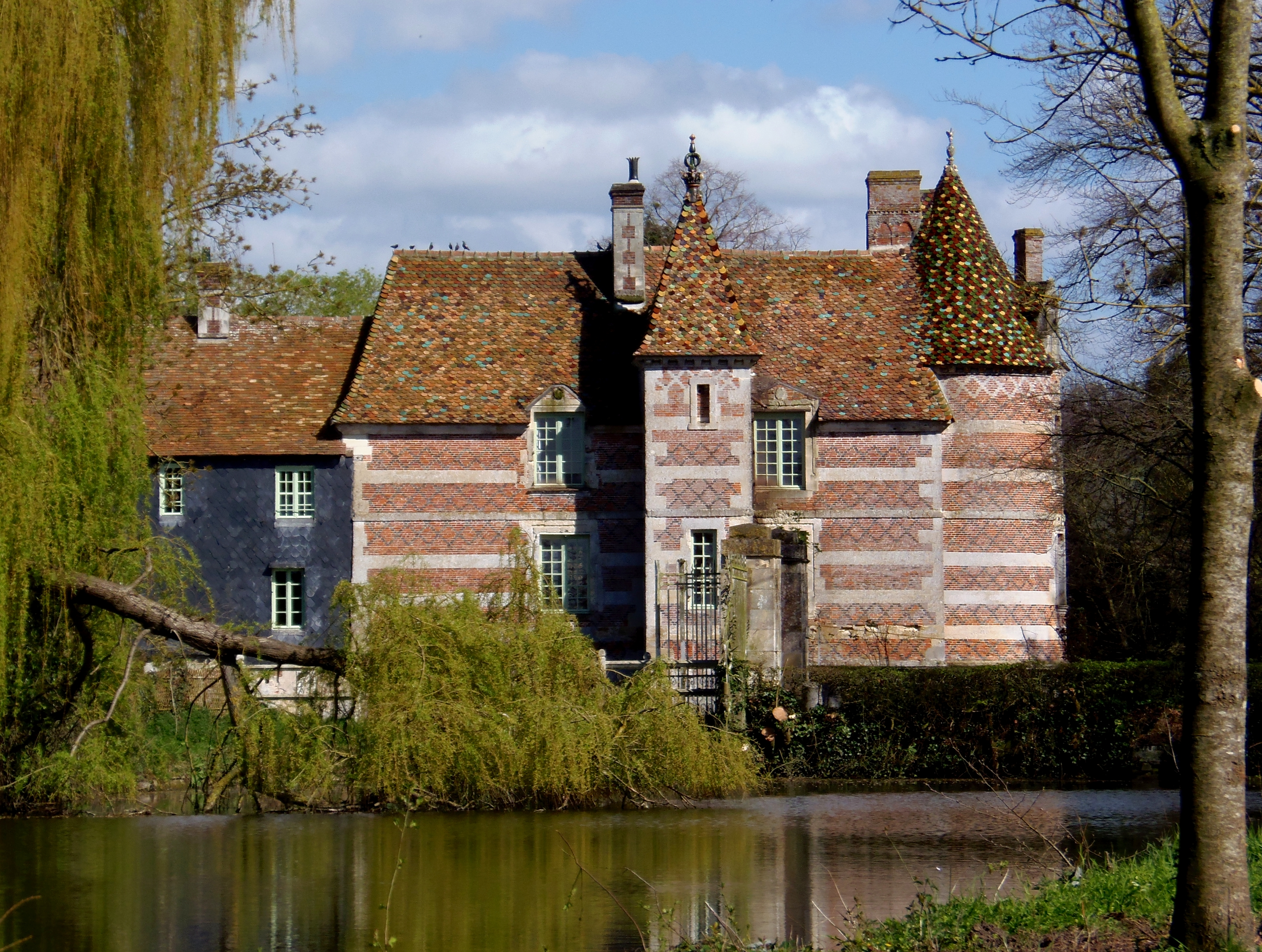
- The chateau in Victot
- Location of Victot-en-Auge
- Location within France Location within Normandy
- Coordinates: 49°09′50″N 0°00′55″W
- Country: France
- Region: Normandy
- Department: Calvados
- Arrondissement: Lisieux
- Canton: Mézidon Vallée d'Auge
- Intercommunality: CC Normandie-Cabourg-Pays d'Auge

Government
  - Mayor (2025–2026): Alexandre Bouillon
- Area^{1}: 14.14 km^{2} (5.46 sq mi)
- Highest elevation: 127 m (417 ft)
- Lowest elevation: 7 m (23 ft)
- Population (2023): 145
  - Density: 10.3/km^{2} (26.6/sq mi)
- Time zone: UTC+01:00 (CET)
  - Summer (DST): UTC+02:00 (CEST)
- INSEE/Postal code: 14743 /14430
- ^{1} French Land Register data, which excludes lakes, ponds, glaciers > 1 km^{2} (0.386 sq mi or 247 acres) and river estuaries.

Victot-en-Auge (French pronunciation: [vikto ɑ̃.n‿oʒ], lit. 'Victot in Auge') is a commune in the Calvados department in the Normandy region in northwestern France. It was formed on 1 January 2025, with the merger of Victot-Pontfol and Gerrots.

== See also ==
- Communes of the Calvados department
