= Méry-Bissières-en-Auge =

- Commune
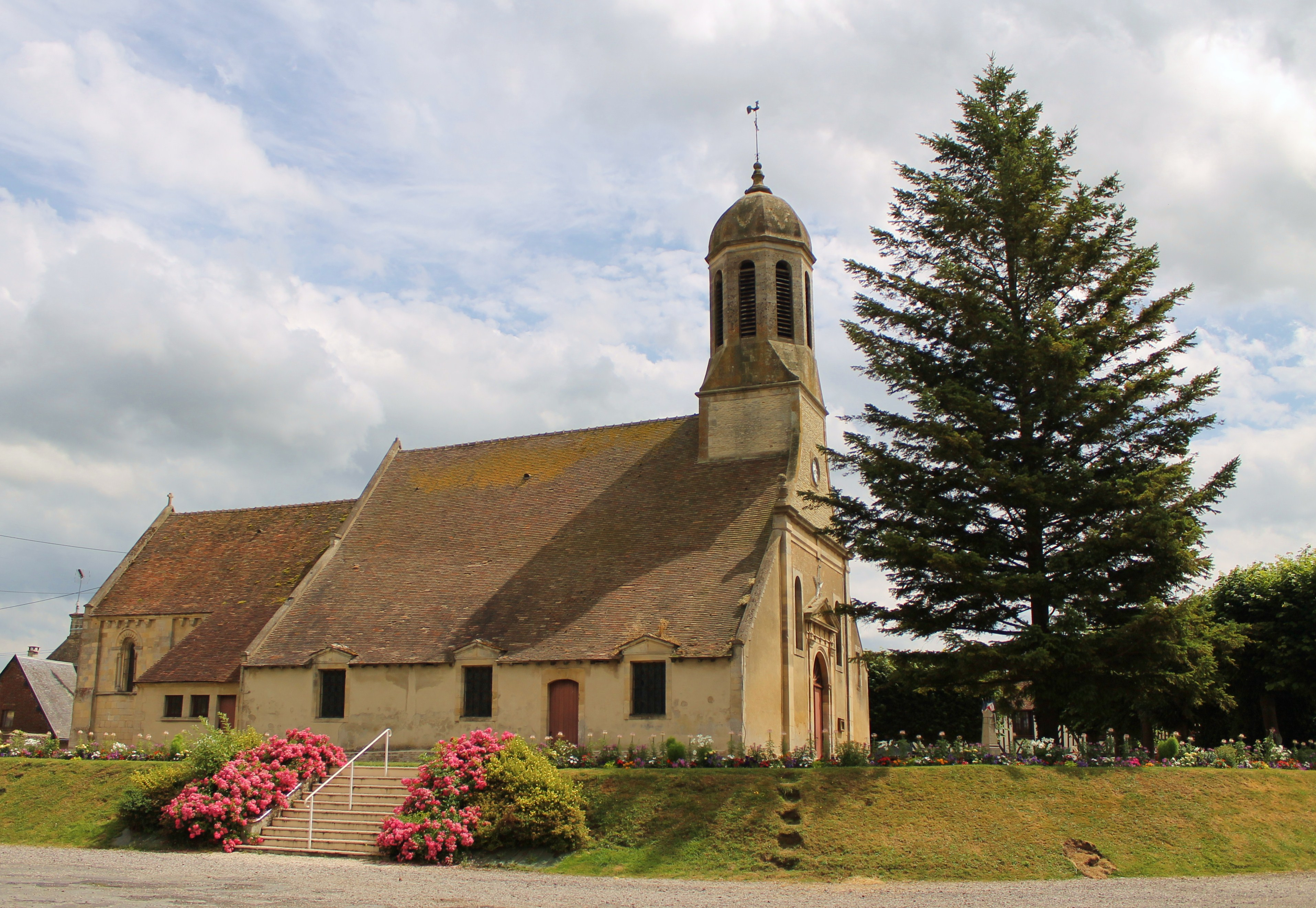
- The church in Méry-Corbon

- Coat of arms
- Location of Méry-Bissières-en-Auge
- Location within France Location within Normandy
- Coordinates: 49°08′10″N 0°04′59″W
- Country: France
- Region: Normandy
- Department: Calvados
- Arrondissement: Lisieux
- Canton: Mézidon Vallée d'Auge
- Intercommunality: CA Lisieux Normandie

Government
  - Mayor (2020–2026): Christophe Petit
- Area^{1}: 9.12 km^{2} (3.52 sq mi)
- Population (2023): 1,082
  - Density: 119/km^{2} (307/sq mi)
- Time zone: UTC+01:00 (CET)
  - Summer (DST): UTC+02:00 (CEST)
- INSEE/Postal code: 14410 /14370
- ^{1} French Land Register data, which excludes lakes, ponds, glaciers > 1 km^{2} (0.386 sq mi or 247 acres) and river estuaries.

Méry-Bissières-en-Auge (French pronunciation: [meʁi bisjɛʁ ɑ̃.n‿oʒ], literally Méry Bissières in Auge) is a commune in the department of Calvados, northwestern France. The municipality was established on 1 January 2017 by merger of the former communes of Méry-Corbon (the seat) and Bissières.

== See also ==
- Communes of the Calvados department
