= Manerbe =

- Commune
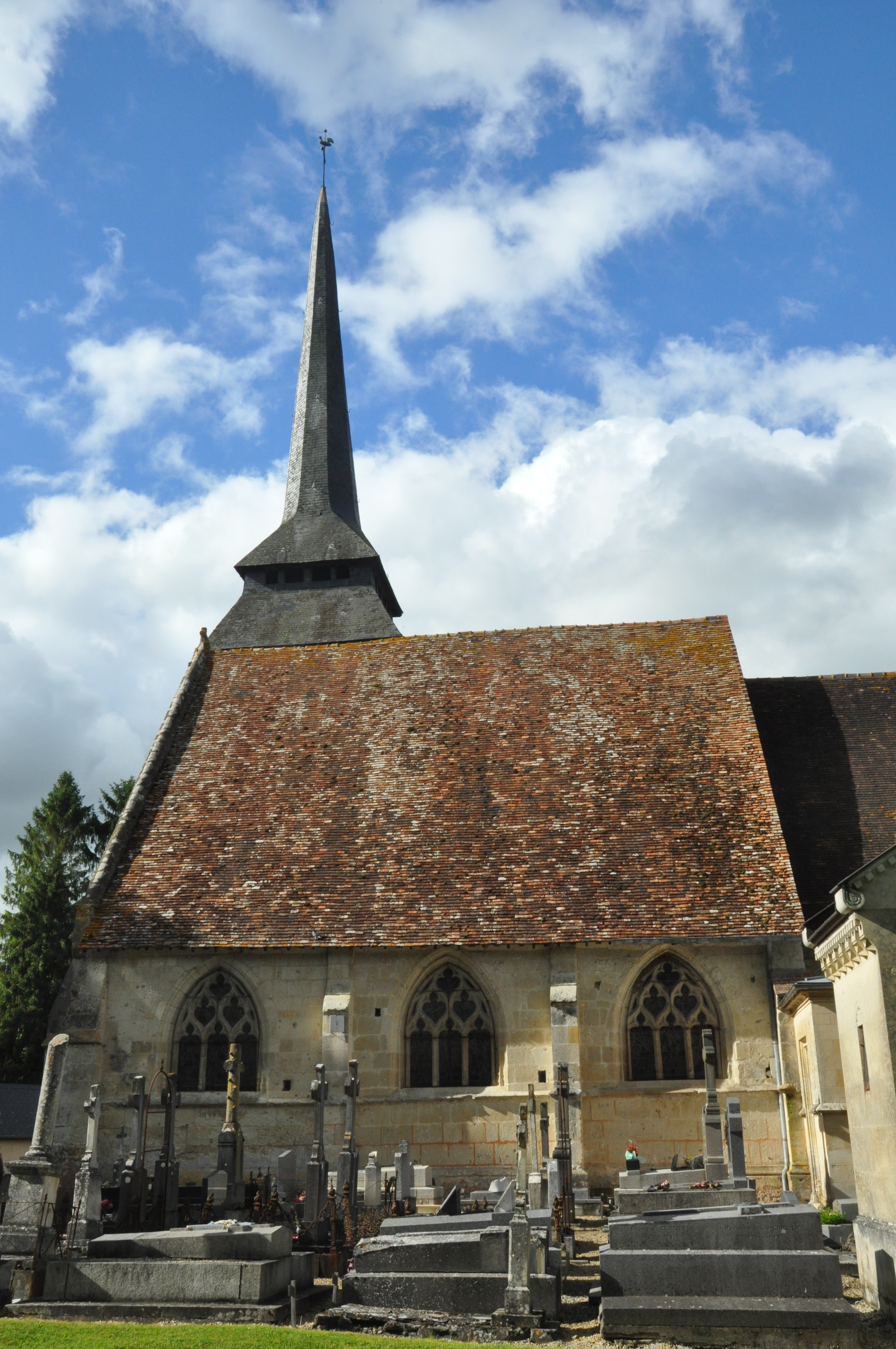
- The church in Manerbe
- Location of Manerbe
- Location within France Location within Normandy
- Coordinates: 49°11′09″N 0°10′32″E
- Country: France
- Region: Normandy
- Department: Calvados
- Arrondissement: Lisieux
- Canton: Mézidon Vallée d'Auge
- Intercommunality: CC Terre d'Auge

Government
  - Mayor (2020–2026): Laurent Mayeux
- Area^{1}: 18.27 km^{2} (7.05 sq mi)
- Elevation: 80 m (260 ft)
- Highest elevation: 171 m (561 ft)
- Lowest elevation: 50 m (160 ft)
- Population (2023): 544
  - Density: 29.8/km^{2} (77.1/sq mi)
- Time zone: UTC+01:00 (CET)
  - Summer (DST): UTC+02:00 (CEST)
- INSEE/Postal code: 14398 /14340
- ^{1} French Land Register data, which excludes lakes, ponds, glaciers > 1 km^{2} (0.386 sq mi or 247 acres) and river estuaries.

Manerbe (French pronunciation: [manɛʁb]) is a commune in the Calvados department in the Normandy region in northwestern France.

== Population ==
Historical population
Year	Pop.	±% p.a.
1968	301	—
1975	271	−1.49%
1982	332	+2.94%
1990	498	+5.20%
1999	500	+0.04%
2007	465	−0.90%
2012	545	+3.23%
2017	555	+0.36%
2023	544	−0.33%
Source: INSEE

== See also ==
- Communes of the Calvados department
