= Formentin =

- Commune
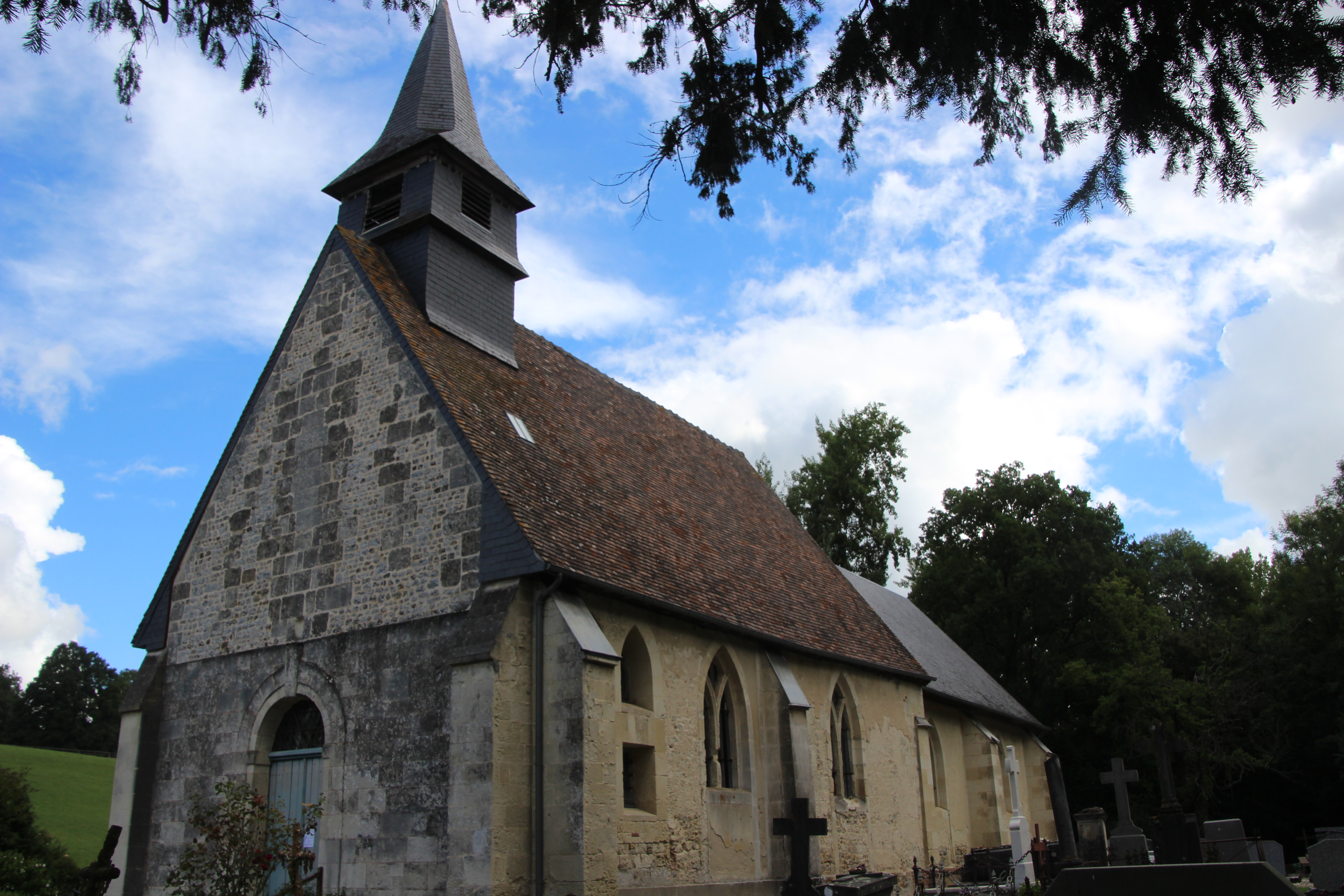
- The church in Formentin
- Location of Formentin
- Location within France Location within Normandy
- Coordinates: 49°11′55″N 0°08′32″E
- Country: France
- Region: Normandy
- Department: Calvados
- Arrondissement: Lisieux
- Canton: Mézidon Vallée d'Auge
- Intercommunality: CC Terre d'Auge

Government
  - Mayor (2020–2026): Marie-Thérèse Lesquerbault
- Area^{1}: 5.93 km^{2} (2.29 sq mi)
- Elevation: 100 m (330 ft)
- Highest elevation: 154 m (505 ft)
- Lowest elevation: 74 m (243 ft)
- Population (2023): 269
  - Density: 45.4/km^{2} (117/sq mi)
- Time zone: UTC+01:00 (CET)
  - Summer (DST): UTC+02:00 (CEST)
- INSEE/Postal code: 14280 /14340
- ^{1} French Land Register data, which excludes lakes, ponds, glaciers > 1 km^{2} (0.386 sq mi or 247 acres) and river estuaries.

Formentin (French pronunciation: [fɔʁmɑ̃tɛ̃]) is a commune in the Calvados department in the Normandy region in northwestern France.

== Population ==
Historical population
Year	Pop.	±% p.a.
1968	151	—
1975	133	−1.80%
1982	151	+1.83%
1990	191	+2.98%
1999	206	+0.84%
2007	224	+1.05%
2012	212	−1.10%
2017	250	+3.35%
2023	269	+1.23%
Source: INSEE

== See also ==
- Communes of the Calvados department
