= Drubec =

- Commune
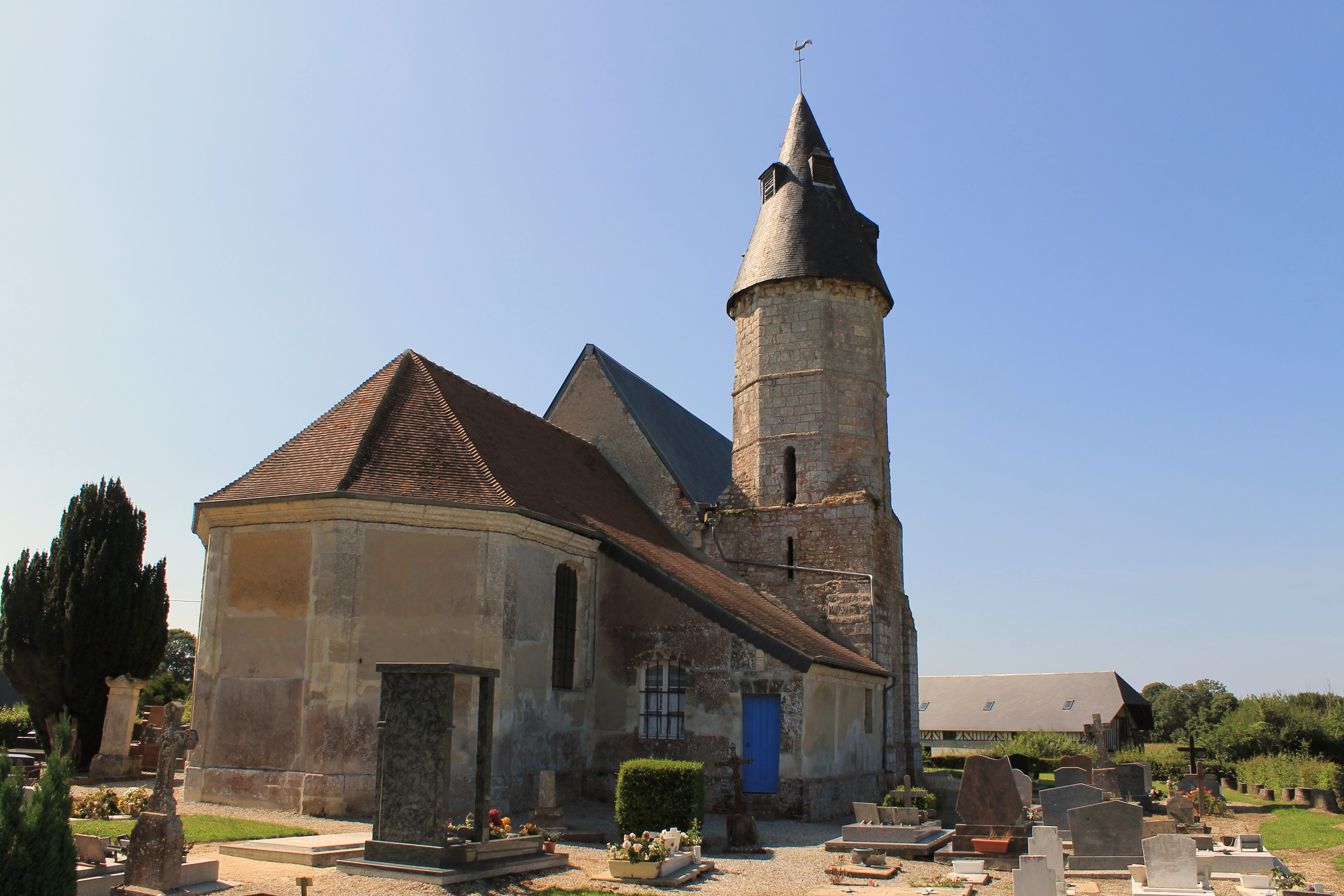
- The church in Drubec
- Location of Drubec
- Location within France Location within Normandy
- Coordinates: 49°15′41″N 0°06′32″E
- Country: France
- Region: Normandy
- Department: Calvados
- Arrondissement: Lisieux
- Canton: Mézidon Vallée d'Auge
- Intercommunality: CC Terre d'Auge

Government
  - Mayor (2020–2026): Antoine Vilars
- Area^{1}: 3.14 km^{2} (1.21 sq mi)
- Elevation: 125 m (410 ft)
- Highest elevation: 145 m (476 ft)
- Lowest elevation: 80 m (260 ft)
- Population (2023): 111
  - Density: 35.4/km^{2} (91.6/sq mi)
- Time zone: UTC+01:00 (CET)
  - Summer (DST): UTC+02:00 (CEST)
- INSEE/Postal code: 14230 /14130
- ^{1} French Land Register data, which excludes lakes, ponds, glaciers > 1 km^{2} (0.386 sq mi or 247 acres) and river estuaries.

Drubec (French pronunciation: [dʁybɛk]) is a commune in the Calvados department in the Normandy region in northwestern France.

== Population ==
Historical population
Year	Pop.	±% p.a.
1968	109	—
1975	84	−3.65%
1982	85	+0.17%
1990	95	+1.40%
1999	112	+1.85%
2007	112	+0.00%
2012	110	−0.36%
2017	118	+1.41%
2023	111	−1.01%
Source: INSEE

== See also ==
- Communes of the Calvados department
