= Bonnebosq =

- Commune
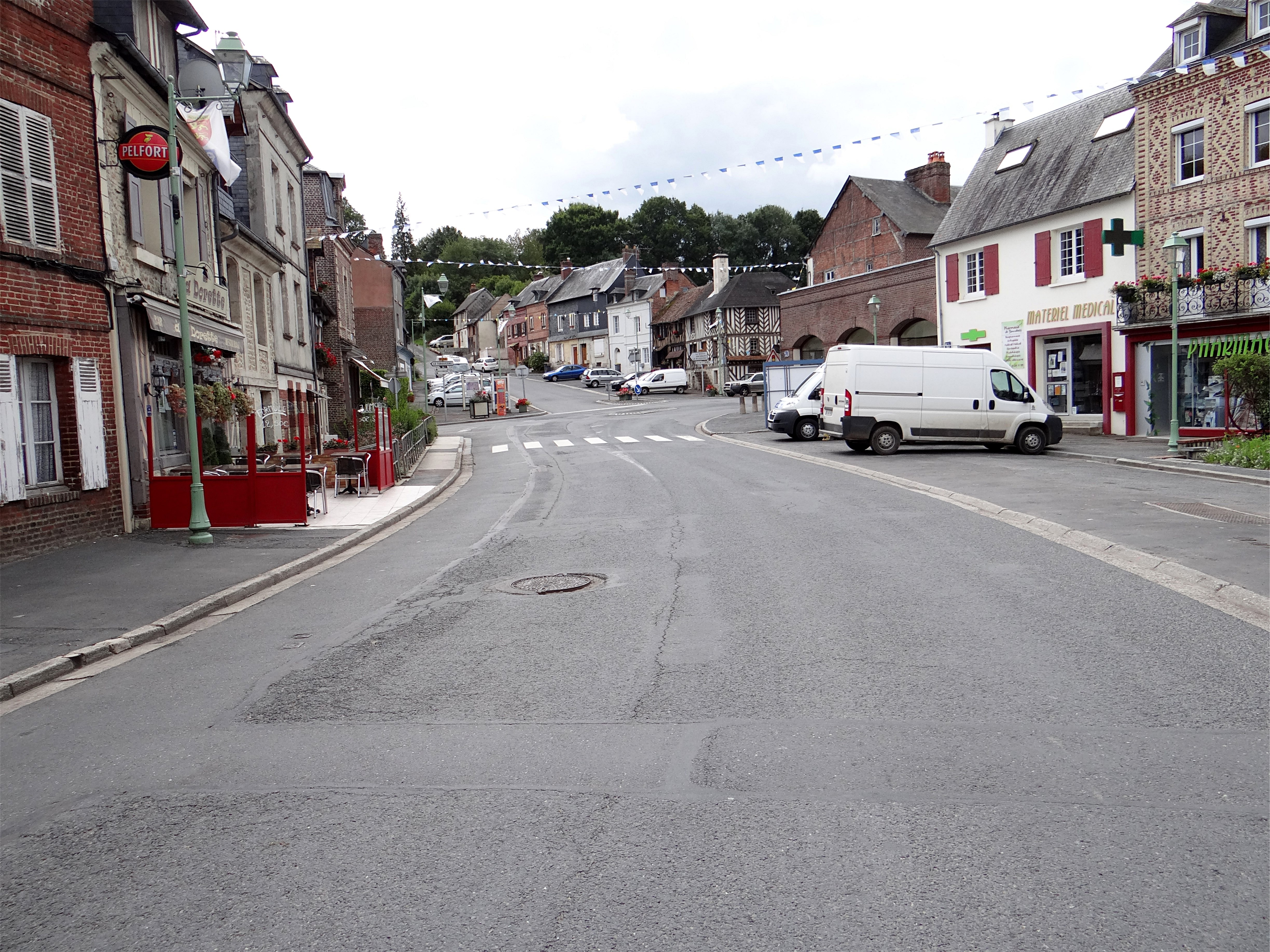
- The main street in Bonnebosq

- Coat of arms
- Location of Bonnebosq
- Location within France Location within Normandy
- Coordinates: 49°12′20″N 0°04′43″E
- Country: France
- Region: Normandy
- Department: Calvados
- Arrondissement: Lisieux
- Canton: Mézidon Vallée d'Auge
- Intercommunality: CC Terre d'Auge

Government
  - Mayor (2020–2026): Anne Varin
- Area^{1}: 12.17 km^{2} (4.70 sq mi)
- Elevation: 150 m (490 ft)
- Highest elevation: 159 m (522 ft)
- Lowest elevation: 51 m (167 ft)
- Population (2023): 649
  - Density: 53.3/km^{2} (138/sq mi)
- Time zone: UTC+01:00 (CET)
  - Summer (DST): UTC+02:00 (CEST)
- INSEE/Postal code: 14083 /14340
- ^{1} French Land Register data, which excludes lakes, ponds, glaciers > 1 km^{2} (0.386 sq mi or 247 acres) and river estuaries.

Bonnebosq (French pronunciation: [bɔnbo]) is a commune in the Calvados department in the Normandy region in northwestern France.

== Population ==
Historical population
Year	Pop.	±% p.a.
1968	636	—
1975	594	−0.97%
1982	650	+1.30%
1990	599	−1.02%
1999	654	+0.98%
2007	702	+0.89%
2012	709	+0.20%
2017	677	−0.92%
2023	649	−0.70%
Source: INSEE

== See also ==
- Communes of the Calvados department
