= Léaupartie =

- Commune
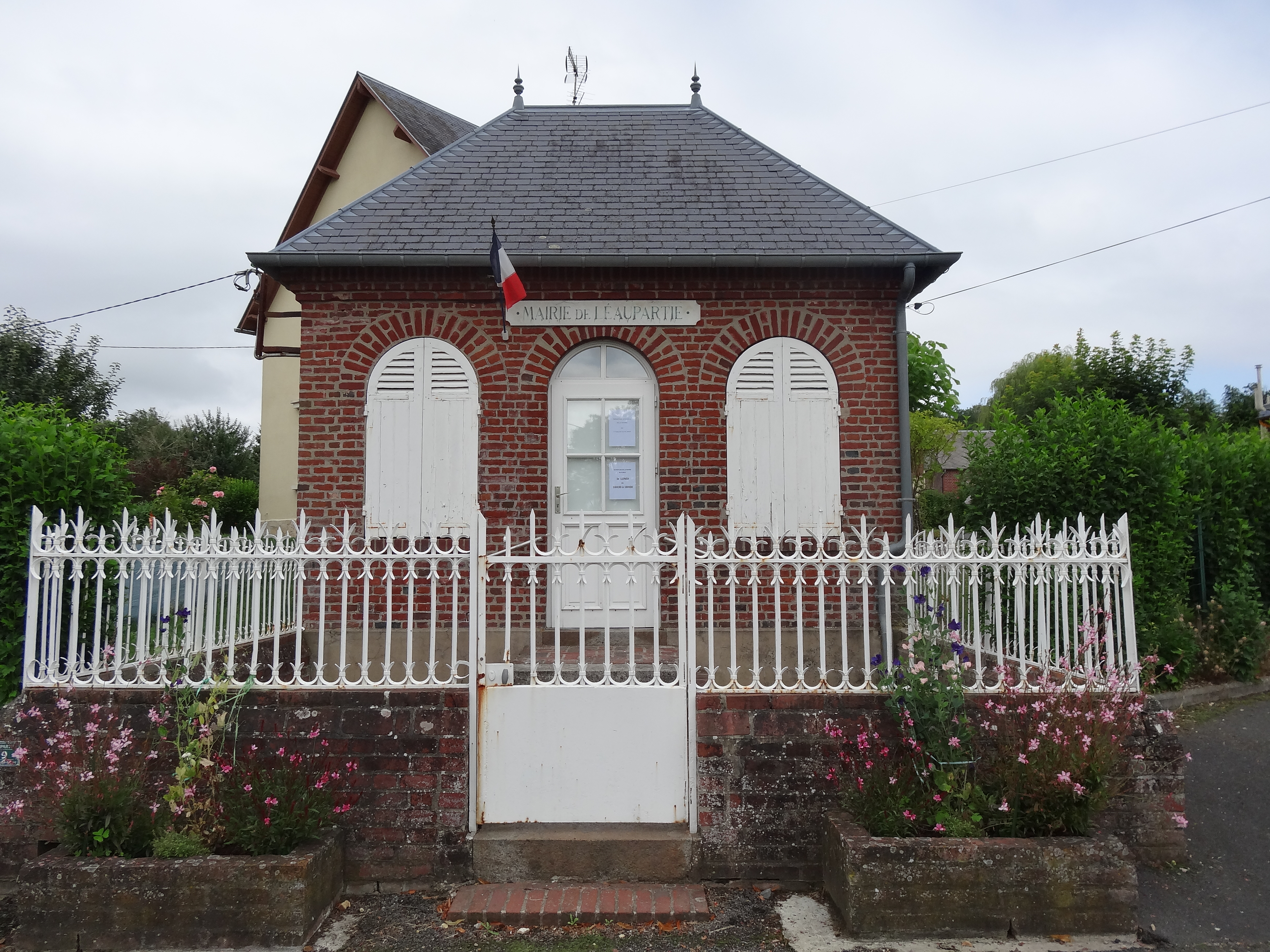
- The town hall in Léaupartie
- Location of Léaupartie
- Location within France Location within Normandy
- Coordinates: 49°11′05″N 0°02′33″E
- Country: France
- Region: Normandy
- Department: Calvados
- Arrondissement: Lisieux
- Canton: Mézidon Vallée d'Auge
- Intercommunality: CC Terre d'Auge

Government
  - Mayor (2020–2026): Jean-François Marin
- Area^{1}: 3.20 km^{2} (1.24 sq mi)
- Elevation: 80 m (260 ft)
- Highest elevation: 133 m (436 ft)
- Lowest elevation: 25 m (82 ft)
- Population (2023): 86
  - Density: 27/km^{2} (70/sq mi)
- Time zone: UTC+01:00 (CET)
  - Summer (DST): UTC+02:00 (CEST)
- INSEE/Postal code: 14358 /14340
- ^{1} French Land Register data, which excludes lakes, ponds, glaciers > 1 km^{2} (0.386 sq mi or 247 acres) and river estuaries.

Léaupartie (French pronunciation: [leopaʁti]) is a commune in the Calvados department in the Normandy region in northwestern France.

== Population ==
Historical population
Year	Pop.	±% p.a.
1968	55	—
1975	47	−2.22%
1982	48	+0.30%
1990	47	−0.26%
1999	62	+3.13%
2007	68	+1.16%
2012	90	+5.77%
2017	88	−0.45%
2023	86	−0.38%
Source: INSEE

== See also ==
- Communes of the Calvados department
