= La Boissière, Calvados =

La Boissière
- Commune
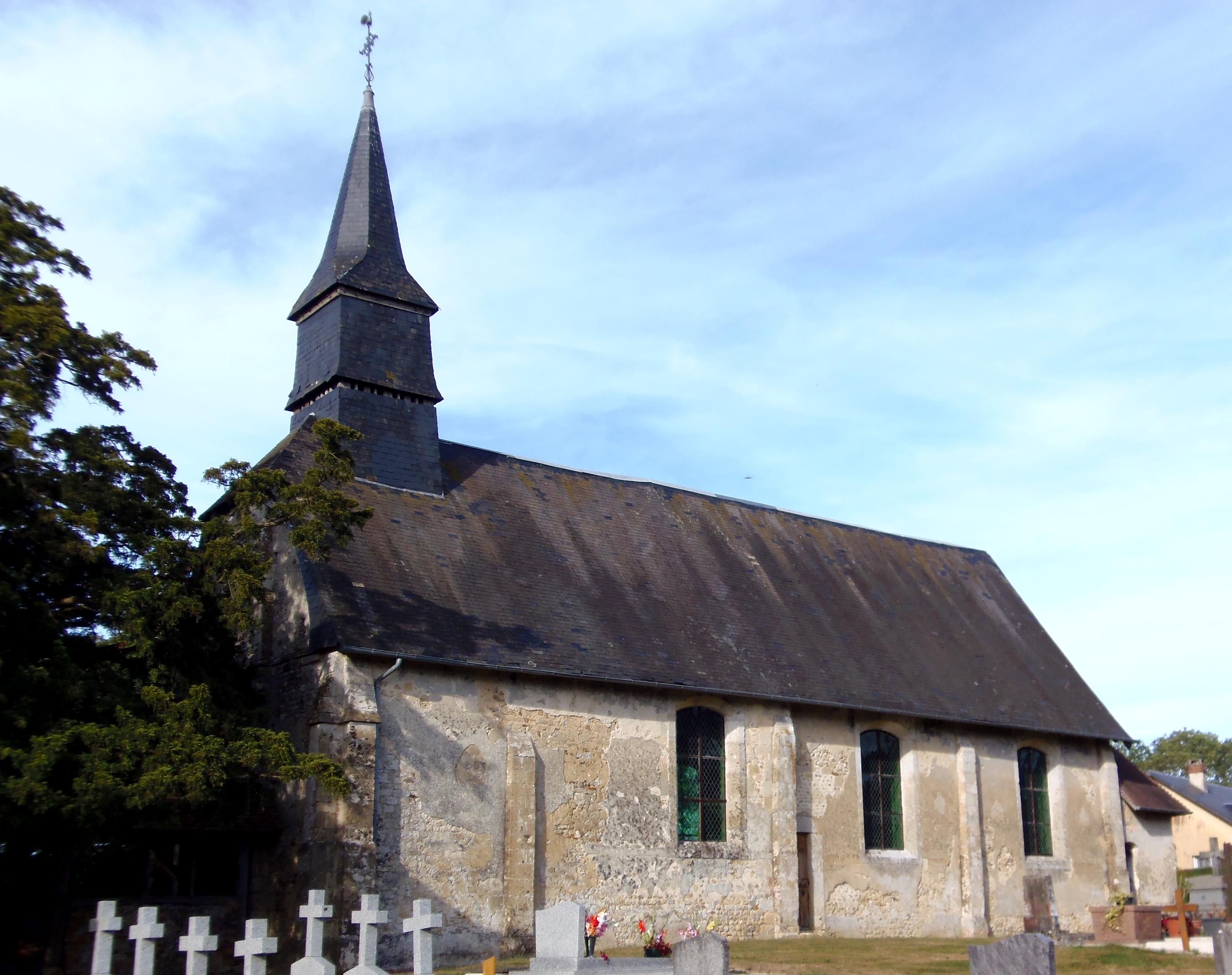
- The church in La Boissière
- Location of La Boissière
- Location within France Location within Normandy
- Coordinates: 49°08′12″N 0°07′55″E
- Country: France
- Region: Normandy
- Department: Calvados
- Arrondissement: Lisieux
- Canton: Mézidon Vallée d'Auge
- Intercommunality: CA Lisieux Normandie

Government
  - Mayor (2020–2026): Laurent Caffiaux
- Area^{1}: 2.02 km^{2} (0.78 sq mi)
- Elevation: 168 m (551 ft)
- Highest elevation: 176 m (577 ft)
- Lowest elevation: 115 m (377 ft)
- Population (2023): 187
  - Density: 92.6/km^{2} (240/sq mi)
- Time zone: UTC+01:00 (CET)
  - Summer (DST): UTC+02:00 (CEST)
- INSEE/Postal code: 14082 /14340
- ^{1} French Land Register data, which excludes lakes, ponds, glaciers > 1 km^{2} (0.386 sq mi or 247 acres) and river estuaries.

La Boissière (French pronunciation: [la bwasjɛʁ]) is a commune in the Calvados department in the Normandy region in northwestern France.

== Population ==
Historical population
Year	Pop.	±% p.a.
1968	85	—
1975	98	+2.05%
1982	111	+1.80%
1990	118	+0.77%
1999	121	+0.28%
2007	144	+2.20%
2012	210	+7.84%
2017	189	−2.09%
2023	187	−0.18%
Source: INSEE

== Personalities ==
- Pierre Lambert de la Motte

== See also ==
- Communes of the Calvados department
