= Cambremer =

- Commune
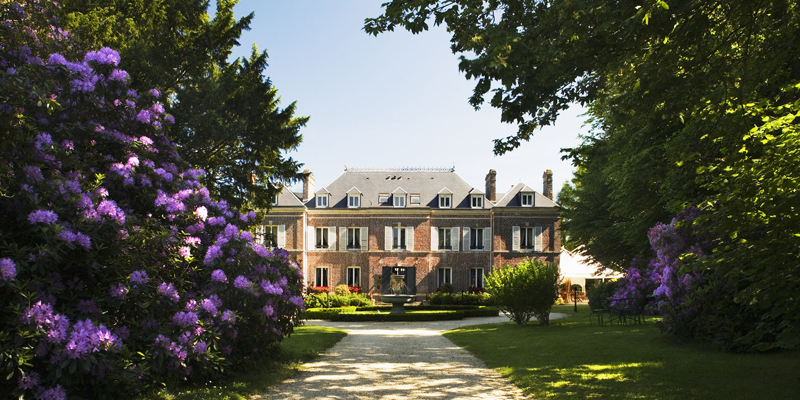
- Chateau Les Bruyères

- Coat of arms
- Location of Cambremer
- Location within France Location within Normandy
- Coordinates: 49°09′10″N 0°02′54″E
- Country: France
- Region: Normandy
- Department: Calvados
- Arrondissement: Lisieux
- Canton: Mézidon Vallée d'Auge
- Intercommunality: CA Lisieux Normandie

Government
  - Mayor (2020–2026): Sylvie Feremans
- Area^{1}: 27.05 km^{2} (10.44 sq mi)
- Elevation: 96 m (315 ft)
- Highest elevation: 162 m (531 ft)
- Lowest elevation: 20 m (66 ft)
- Population (2023): 1,294
  - Density: 47.84/km^{2} (123.9/sq mi)
- Time zone: UTC+01:00 (CET)
  - Summer (DST): UTC+02:00 (CEST)
- INSEE/Postal code: 14126 /14340
- ^{1} French Land Register data, which excludes lakes, ponds, glaciers > 1 km^{2} (0.386 sq mi or 247 acres) and river estuaries.

Cambremer (French pronunciation: [kɑ̃bʁəmɛʁ]) is a commune in the Calvados department in the Normandy region in northwestern France. Cambremer is located in the heart of the Pays d'Auge, between Lisieux and Caen. The village is twinned with Witheridge, UK, and the two villages have annual exchange trips (although not solely for students).

== Etymology ==
The exact etymology of the name of the town is unknown. The village is mentioned, however, from the seventh century under the Latinized form of Cambrimaro.

The second element is probably the Germanic meaning lake or pond (see Old English meri: lake, pond, now in place names -Mère). Common in the north of France (see Mortemer).

== History ==
In 1973, the former communes of Grandouet, Saint-Aubin-sur-Algot and Saint-Pair-du-Mont were incorporated in Cambremer. On 1 January 2019, the former commune of Saint-Laurent-du-Mont was merged into Cambremer.

== Heraldry ==
The arms of the town of Cambremer are: Gules the two-headed eagle displayed gold.

== Population ==
Historical population
| Year | Pop. | ±% p.a. |
|---|---|---|
| 1968 | 1,146 | — |
| 1975 | 1,013 | −1.75% |
| 1982 | 1,012 | −0.01% |
| 1990 | 1,118 | +1.25% |
| 1999 | 1,229 | +1.06% |
| 2007 | 1,270 | +0.41% |
| 2012 | 1,334 | +0.99% |
| 2017 | 1,359 | +0.37% |
| 2023 | 1,294 | −0.81% |
Source: INSEE

== See also ==
- Communes of the Calvados department
