= Repentigny, Calvados =

Repentigny
- Commune
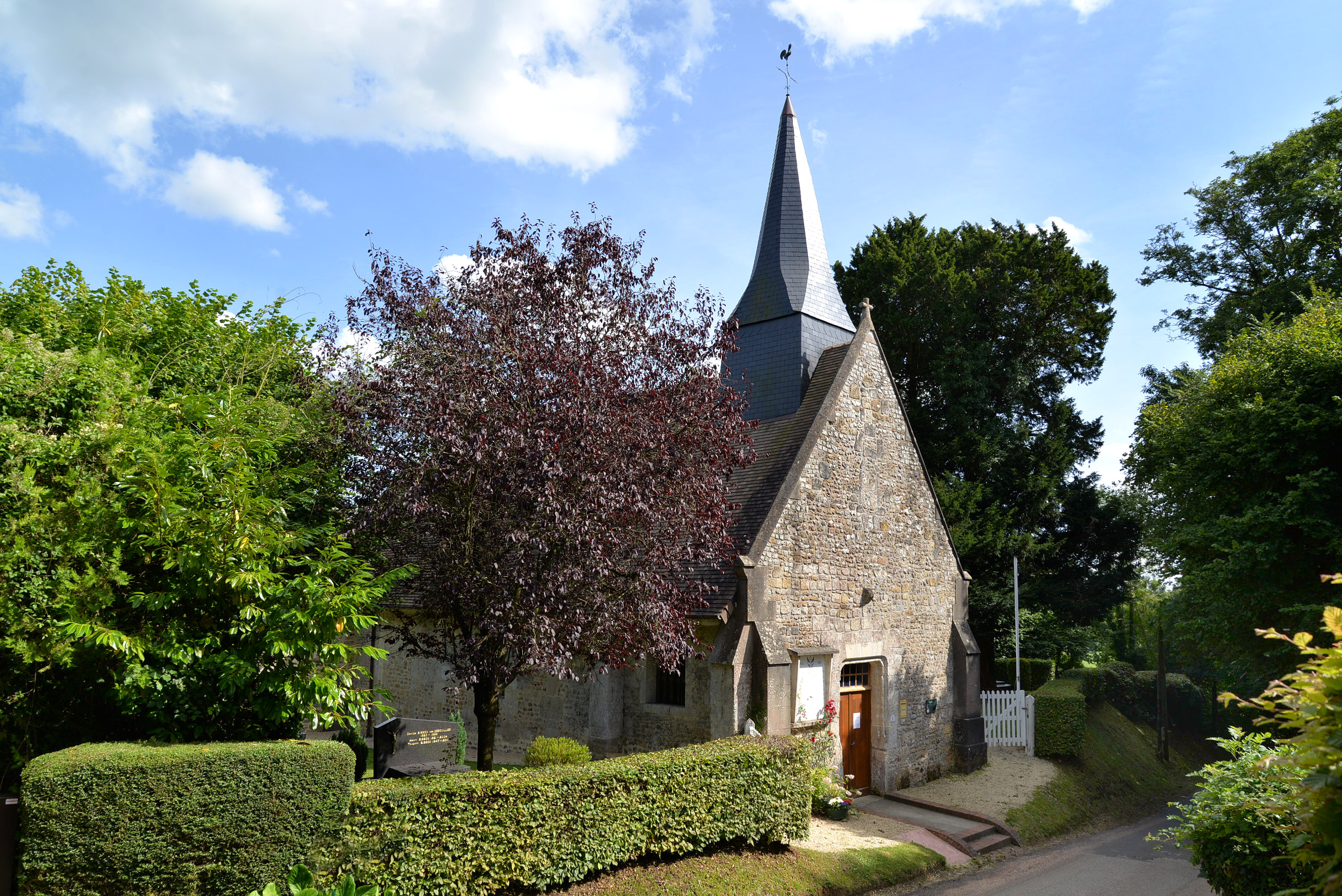
- The church in Repentigny
- Location of Repentigny
- Location within France Location within Normandy
- Coordinates: 49°12′21″N 0°02′48″E
- Country: France
- Region: Normandy
- Department: Calvados
- Arrondissement: Lisieux
- Canton: Mézidon Vallée d'Auge
- Intercommunality: CC Terre d'Auge

Government
  - Mayor (2020–2026): Claude Lemonnier
- Area^{1}: 2.13 km^{2} (0.82 sq mi)
- Elevation: 43 m (141 ft)
- Highest elevation: 135 m (443 ft)
- Lowest elevation: 37 m (121 ft)
- Population (2023): 102
  - Density: 47.9/km^{2} (124/sq mi)
- Time zone: UTC+01:00 (CET)
  - Summer (DST): UTC+02:00 (CEST)
- INSEE/Postal code: 14533 /14340
- ^{1} French Land Register data, which excludes lakes, ponds, glaciers > 1 km^{2} (0.386 sq mi or 247 acres) and river estuaries.

Repentigny (French pronunciation: [ʁəpɑ̃tiɲi]) is a commune in the Calvados department in the Normandy region in northwestern France.

== Population ==
Historical population
Year	Pop.	±% p.a.
1968	56	—
1975	51	−1.33%
1982	52	+0.28%
1990	69	+3.60%
1999	91	+3.12%
2007	89	−0.28%
2012	89	+0.00%
2017	89	+0.00%
2023	102	+2.30%
Source: INSEE

== See also ==
- Communes of the Calvados department
