= Canton of Mézidon Vallée d'Auge =

Coordinates: 49°05′34″N 0°00′27″E

Mézidon Vallée d'Auge
- Canton
- Country: France
- Region: Normandy
- Department: Calvados
- No. of communes: {{{nbcomm}}}
- Area: 459.36 km^{2} (177.36 sq mi)
- Population (2023): 24,188
  - Density: 52.656/km^{2} (136.38/sq mi)
- INSEE code: 14 19

The canton of Mézidon Vallée d'Auge (before 2021: Mézidon-Canon) is a canton of France, located in the Calvados department, in the Normandy region.

== Geography ==
This canton is organized around Mézidon Vallée d'Auge. Its altitude varies from 4 m (Méry-Corbon) to 170 m (Castillon-en-Auge) with an average altitude of 42 m.

== Communes ==
Since the French canton reorganisation which came into effect in March 2015, the communes of the canton of Mézidon Vallée d'Auge are:

- Auvillars
- Beaufour-Druval
- Belle Vie en Auge
- Beuvron-en-Auge
- La Boissière
- Bonnebosq
- Cambremer
- Castillon-en-Auge
- Condé-sur-Ifs
- Drubec
- Formentin
- Le Fournet
- Hotot-en-Auge
- La Houblonnière
- Léaupartie
- Lessard-et-le-Chêne
- Manerbe
- Méry-Bissières-en-Auge
- Le Mesnil-Eudes
- Le Mesnil-Simon
- Mézidon Vallée d'Auge
- Les Monceaux
- Montreuil-en-Auge
- Notre-Dame-d'Estrées-Corbon
- Notre-Dame-de-Livaye
- Le Pré-d'Auge
- Prêtreville
- Repentigny
- La Roque-Baignard
- Rumesnil
- Saint-Désir
- Saint-Germain-de-Livet
- Saint-Jean-de-Livet
- Saint-Martin-de-Mailloc
- Saint-Ouen-le-Pin
- Saint-Pierre-des-Ifs
- Valsemé
- Victot-en-Auge

== Demography ==
Historical population
Year	Pop.	±% p.a.
2013	24,489	—
2018	24,118	−0.30%
Source: INSEE

== See also ==
- Cantons of the Calvados department
