= Conder (surname) =

Conder is a surname, and may refer to:

- Charles Conder (1868–1909), English-born Australian artist
- Claude Reignier Conder (1848–1910) of the Palestine Exploration Fund; grandson of editor and author Josiah Conder
- Eustace Rogers Conder (1820–1892), English pastor, author; son of editor and author Josiah Conder
- Georgina Conder, New Zealand film producer
- James Conder (1761–1823), English businessman and numismatist after whom Conder tokens are named; son of John Conder, uncle of editor and author Josiah Conder
- John Conder (1714–1781), nonconformist minister and college head
- Josiah Conder (architect) (1852–1920), architect of European buildings in Japan; grandson of editor and author Josiah Conder
- Josiah Conder (editor and author) (1789–1855), English editor and author; grandson of John Conder
- Katrina Conder, Australian television presenter
- Marston Conder (born 1955), New Zealand mathematician
- Maxine Conder (1926–2021), United States Navy rear admiral
- Peter Conder (1919–1993), British ornithologist and conservationist
- Walter Conder (1888–1974), Australian radio executive
- Whitney Conder (born 1988), American freestyle wrestler
- William Morgan Conder (1897–1947), American politician

== See also ==
- Conde (surname)
- Condé (surname)
