= Condé =

Condé is a French place name and personal name. It is ultimately derived from a Celtic word, "Condate", meaning "confluence" (of two rivers) - from which was derived the Romanised form "Condatum", in use during the Roman period, and thence to the French "Condé" found at various locations.

It may refer to:

== People ==
- Condé Montrose Nast (1873–1942), American publisher
- Condé Benoist Pallen (1858–1929), American Catholic editor and author
- Condé (surname)

== Places ==
- Château de Condé, a private estate in Condé-en-Brie, Aisne, France

=== Places in France that contain the element Condé ===
- Condé, Indre, in the Indre département
- Condé-en-Brie, in the Aisne département
- Condé-Folie, in the Somme département
- Condé-lès-Autry, in the Ardennes département
- Condé-lès-Herpy, in the Ardennes département
- Condé-Northen, in the Moselle département
- Condé-Sainte-Libiaire, in the Seine-et-Marne département
- Condé-sur-Aisne, in the Aisne département
- Condé-sur-Huisne, in the Orne département
- Condé-sur-Ifs, in the Calvados département
- Condé-sur-Iton, in the Eure département
- Condé-sur-l'Escaut, in the Nord département
  - Siege of Condé (1793)
- Condé-sur-Marne, in the Marne département
- Condé-sur-Noireau, in the Calvados département
- Condé-sur-Risle, in the Eure département
- Condé-sur-Sarthe, in the Orne département
- Condé-sur-Seulles, in the Calvados département
- Condé-sur-Suippe, in the Aisne département
- Condé-sur-Vesgre, in the Yvelines département
- Condé-sur-Vire, in the Manche département
- Celles-lès-Condé, in the Aisne département
- La Celle-Condé, in the Cher département
- Montigny-lès-Condé, in the Aisne département
- Rochy-Condé, in the Oise département
- Saint-Christophe-sur-Condé, in the Eure département
- Vieux-Condé, in the Nord département

== Titles ==
- Louis, Grand Condé (1621–1686), French general
- Prince of Condé, a title in the peerage of France, including:
  - Henri II, Prince of Condé (1588–1646)
  - Louis I, Prince of Condé (1530–1569)
  - Louis III, Prince of Condé (1668–1710)
  - Louis Joseph, Prince of Condé (1736–1818)
- Princess of Condé, a title in the peerage of France

== Other ==
- Army of Condé, opposing the French Revolution
- Condé Nast Publications, an American publisher of periodicals
  - Condé Nast Traveler, a lifestyle magazine
- French cruiser Condé, an armored cruiser named for the general
- Condé, a famous pink diamond

== See also ==
Conde is a title of Spanish and Portuguese nobility
