= Condé (surname) =

Condé, Condeh or Kondeh is a common surname among the Mandinka people of West Africa, prevalently Guinea and may refer to:

- Alpha Condé (born 1938), Guinean politician
- Ibrahim Jaffa Condeh, Sierra Leonean journalist and president of the Sierra Leone Journalist Association
- Ibrahima Aminata Condé, Guinean footballer
- J. M. Condé, early 20th-century illustrator
- Mamady Condé, Former Guinean foreign minister
- Maryse Condé (1937–2024), Guadeloupean author
- Miguel Condé (born 1939), Mexican painter
- Sékou Condé (born 1993), Guinean footballer
- Sona Tata Condé, Guinean musician

== See also ==
- Conde (surname)
- Condé (disambiguation)
