= James Conder =

English antiquarian

- Born: 1761; Mile End, London
- Died: 1823 (aged 61–62); Ipswich
- Occupation: Draper
- Parent: Rev John Conder

James Conder (1761–1823) was an English businessman and numismatist. He is known for giving his name to Conder Tokens and because of the coincidence of an ancient hoard of coins being found ten feet under his doorstep when his house was demolished.

== Biography ==
=== Early life ===
James Conder was the seventh and youngest son of a dissenting pastor, John Conder and his wife. He was born at Mile End in London and was educated at Ware in Hertfordshire and later by a Mr French, a Unitarian minister.

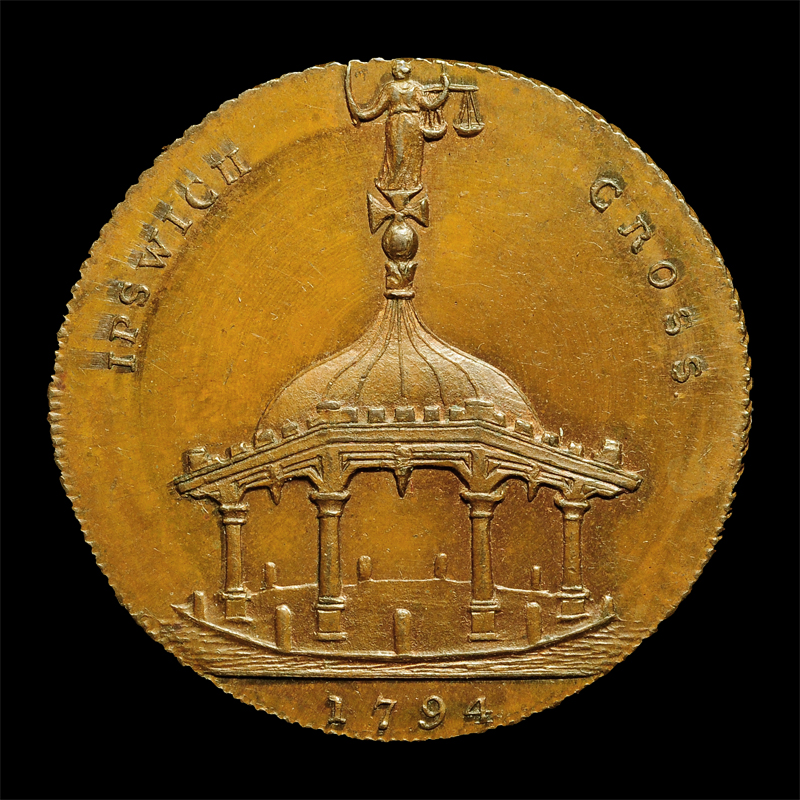
Token issued by James Conder, obverse

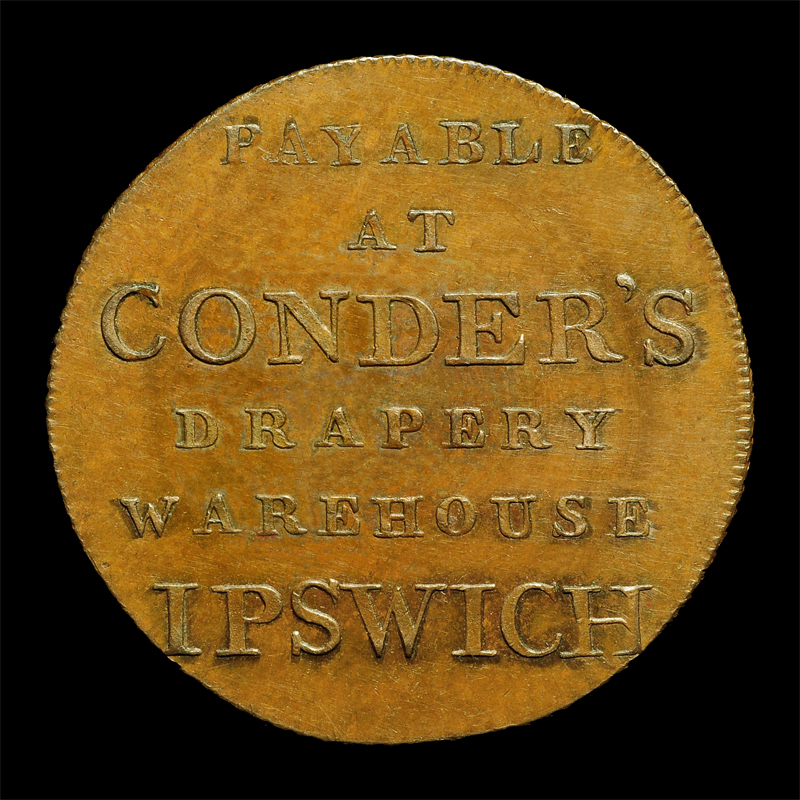
Token issued by James Conder, reverse

=== Businessman and numismatist ===
Conder ran a drapery business in Ipswich. He was one of the first people to catalogue the 18th-century independently minted copper trade coinage that now often bears his name as a category of token coins known as Conder Tokens. He published the first catalogue that would remain the definitive source concerning these coins for almost 100 years. The catalogue was titled, An arrangement of Provincial Coins, tokens, and medalets issued in Great Britain, Ireland, and the colonies, within the last twenty years, from the farthing to the penny size and it was published in 1798.

Conder did not simply study the Tokens; he also issued his own tokens to advertise his own drapery business. At the time the British Government did not issue low value coins as they had not been required. However the changes in the way the population worked was changing and there was a large demand throughout the country for low value coins. Many businesses were encouraged to create their own coins. The token illustrated was a provincial token issued by Conder's own business. The token carries the message Payable at Conder's Drapery Warehouse Ipswich and on the other side Ipswich Cross. That side shows Ipswich Cross and is dated 1794.

=== Church historian ===
Conder was also known for his knowledge of the history of dissenting churches and meeting houses and had contemplated writing on that subject. As it was he was a major contributor to a work by a Mr Wilson on the history and antiquities of churches in the London area.

=== Conder family genealogist ===
James is also credited with completing a book on genealogy called The Conder Family which had been started by his father, John Conder. James completed the work, added details of his own father's life, and had it published in his father's name.

=== Death ===
Conder died after an internal abscess ruptured and caused him twelve hours of severe pain. He was buried in the meeting house in Tacket Street in Ipswich.

== Ipswich Hoard ==
Forty years after his death, his house at the corner of Old Buttermarket and White Hart Lane was demolished, and a hoard of Anglo-Saxon coins was discovered buried ten feet beneath the doorstep.

== Conder family ==
The Conder family, stemming from his father, John Conder, has produced many prominent individuals.

Conder's nephew was Josiah Conder, a leading author, editor and abolitionist.

== Bibliography ==
- Conder, James. An arrangement of Provincial Coins, tokens, and medalets issued in Great Britain, Ireland, and the colonies, within the last twenty years, from the farthing to the penny size. Ipswich: G. Jermyn, 1798.
