= Saint-Christophe-sur-Condé =

- Commune
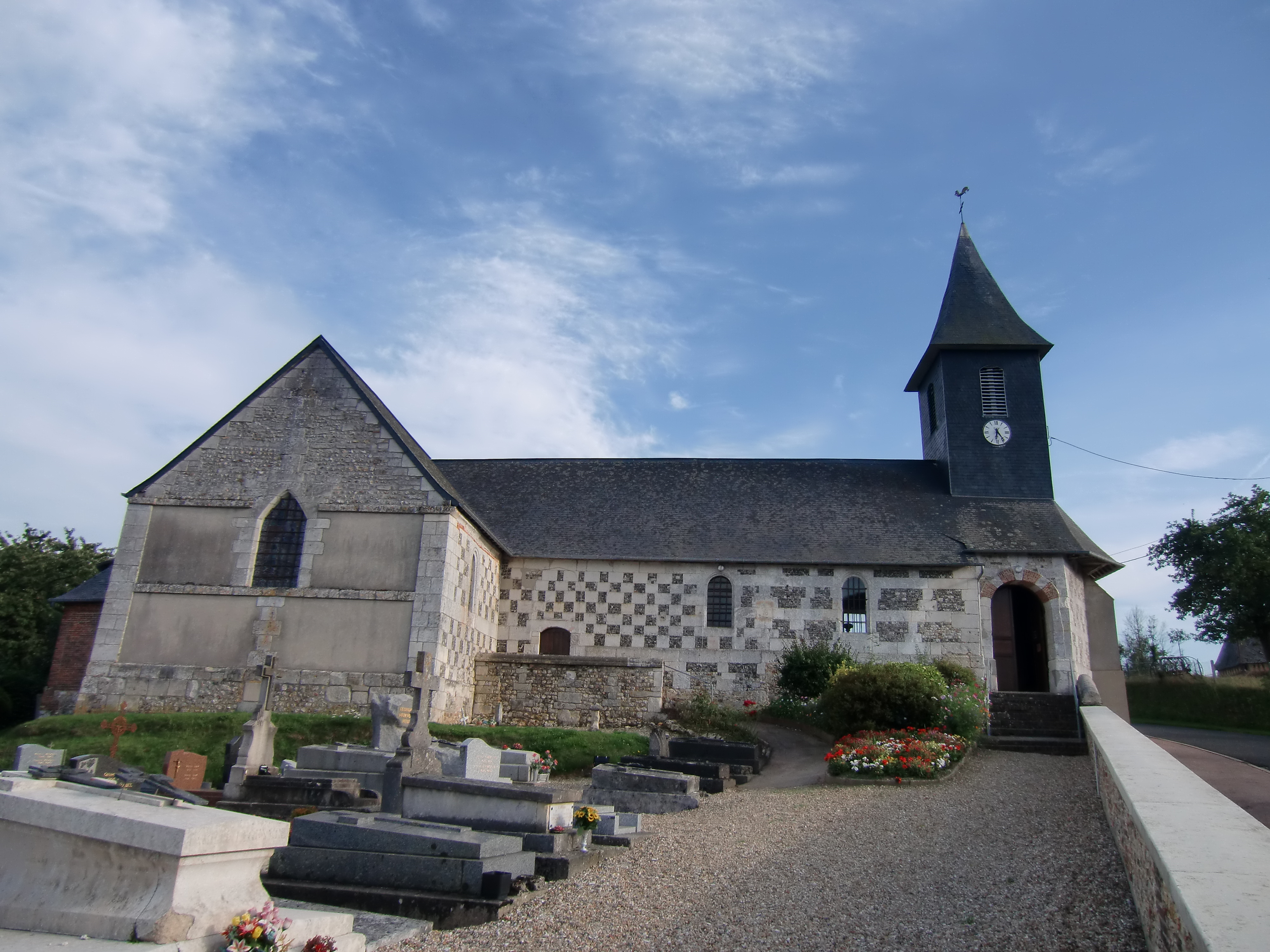
- The church in Saint-Christophe-sur-Condé

- Coat of arms
- Location of Saint-Christophe-sur-Condé
- Location within France Location within Normandy
- Coordinates: 49°17′17″N 0°36′02″E
- Country: France
- Region: Normandy
- Department: Eure
- Arrondissement: Bernay
- Canton: Beuzeville

Government
  - Mayor (2020–2026): Julien Garancher
- Area^{1}: 9 km^{2} (3.5 sq mi)
- Elevation: 134 m (440 ft)
- Highest elevation: 144 m (472 ft)
- Lowest elevation: 70 m (230 ft)
- Population (2023): 440
  - Density: 49/km^{2} (130/sq mi)
- Time zone: UTC+01:00 (CET)
  - Summer (DST): UTC+02:00 (CEST)
- INSEE/Postal code: 27522 /27450
- ^{1} French Land Register data, which excludes lakes, ponds, glaciers > 1 km^{2} (0.386 sq mi or 247 acres) and river estuaries.

Saint-Christophe-sur-Condé (French pronunciation: [sɛ̃ kʁistɔf syʁ kɔ̃de], literally Saint-Christophe on Condé) is a commune in the Eure department in Normandy in northern France.

== Geography ==
The commune along with another 69 communes shares part of a 4,747 hectare, Natura 2000 conservation area, called Risle, Guiel, Charentonne.

== Population ==
Historical population
Year	Pop.	±% p.a.
1968	304	—
1975	270	−1.68%
1982	281	+0.57%
1990	290	+0.39%
1999	297	+0.27%
2007	377	+3.03%
2012	442	+3.23%
2017	481	+1.71%
2023	440	−1.47%
Source: INSEE

== See also ==
- Communes of the Eure department
