= Conder =

A conder, in fishing, was someone who stood on the shore – usually on high ground – and signalled fishing boats as to the direction and location of shoals of fish, such as herrings, mackerel and pilchards.

== People ==
- Conder (surname)

== Places ==
- Conder, Australian Capital Territory
- Conder Green, Lancashire, England
- River Conder, Lancashire, England
- Conder is also a residential apartment building in Melbourne Docklands by architect Nonda Katsalidis
