= Condé-sur-Seulles =

- Commune
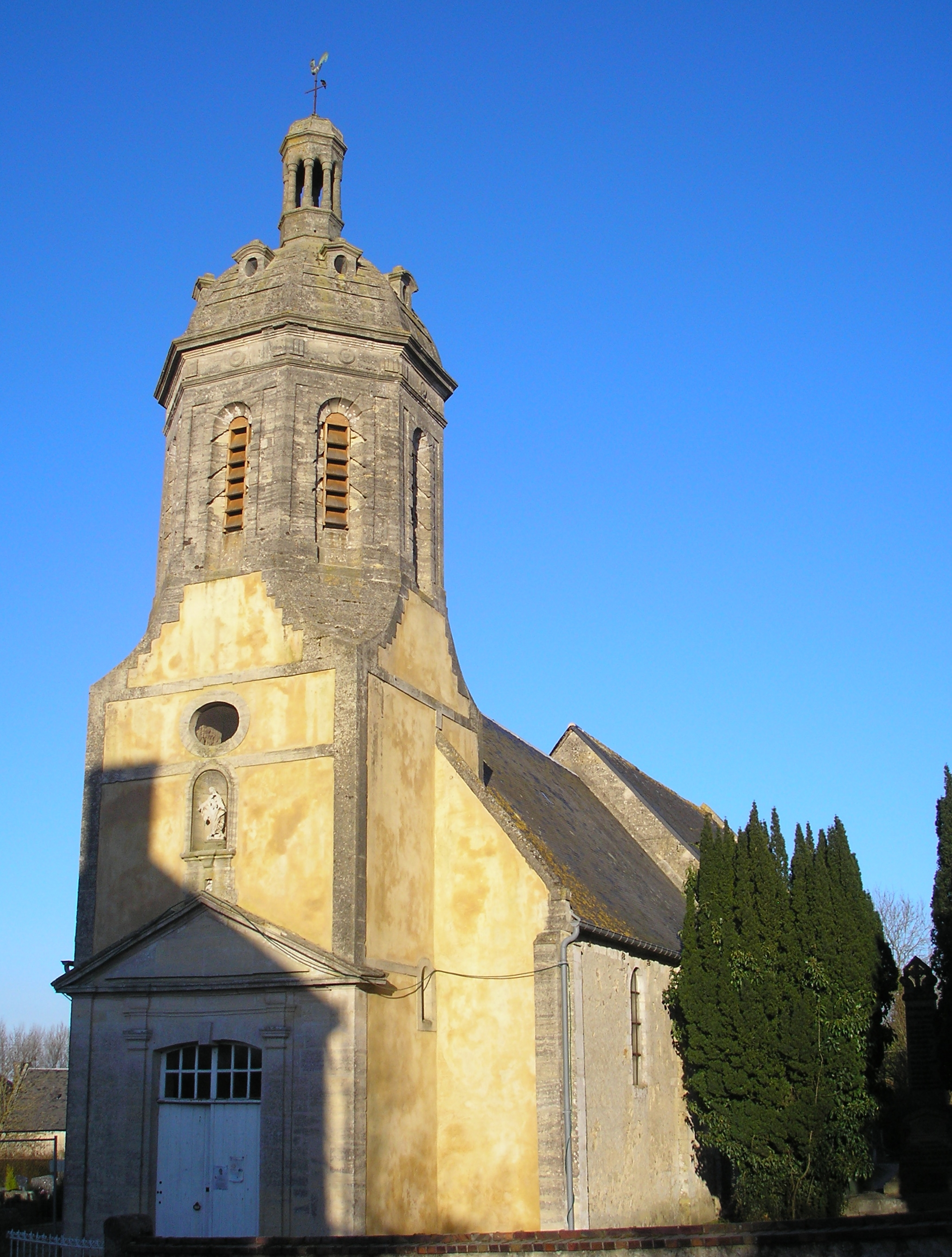
- The church in Condé-sur-Seulles
- Location of Condé-sur-Seulles
- Location within France Location within Normandy
- Coordinates: 49°13′32″N 0°38′02″W
- Country: France
- Region: Normandy
- Department: Calvados
- Arrondissement: Bayeux
- Canton: Bayeux
- Intercommunality: CC Bayeux Intercom

Government
  - Mayor (2020–2026): Émile Touffaire
- Area^{1}: 2.44 km^{2} (0.94 sq mi)
- Elevation: 79 m (259 ft)
- Highest elevation: 90 m (300 ft)
- Lowest elevation: 35 m (115 ft)
- Population (2023): 302
  - Density: 124/km^{2} (321/sq mi)
- Time zone: UTC+01:00 (CET)
  - Summer (DST): UTC+02:00 (CEST)
- INSEE/Postal code: 14175 /14400
- ^{1} French Land Register data, which excludes lakes, ponds, glaciers > 1 km^{2} (0.386 sq mi or 247 acres) and river estuaries.

Condé-sur-Seulles (French pronunciation: [kɔ̃de syʁ sœl]) is a commune in the Calvados department in the Normandy region in northwestern France.

It is situated on the river Seulles.

== Population ==
Historical population
Year	Pop.	±% p.a.
1968	137	—
1975	141	+0.41%
1982	146	+0.50%
1990	162	+1.31%
1999	206	+2.71%
2007	231	+1.44%
2012	266	+2.86%
2017	293	+1.95%
2023	302	+0.51%
Source: INSEE

== See also ==
- Condé-sur-Ifs
- Condé-sur-Noireau
- Communes of the Calvados department
