= Conde (surname) =

Conde (count in the Spanish and Portuguese languages) is a surname. Notable people with the surname include:

- Abdoulaye Conde (born 2002), Guinean footballer
- Anabel Conde (born 1975), Spanish singer
- Chiquinho Conde (born 1965), Mozambican football manager
- Diego Conde (born 1998), Spanish footballer
- Fernando Ponte Conde (1907–1978), Spanish sports leader
- Gonzalo Julián Conde (born 1998), Argentine DJ and record producer known as Bizarrap
- Javier Conde (born 1975), Spanish bullfighter
- John A. Conde (1918–2008), American automotive executive and historian
- José Luis Conde (1911–1992), Spanish footballer and manager
- Julio Conde (1915–1995), Spanish luthier
- Maite Conde, Brazilian academic
- María Conde (born 1997), Spanish basketball player
- Mario Conde (born 1948), Spanish businessman and politician
- Martín Conde (born 1971), Argentine beach volleyball player
- Ninel Conde (born 1970), Mexican singer and actress
- Norberto Conde (1931–2014), Argentine footballer
- Patricia Conde (Mexican actress) (born 1945), Mexican actress
- Patricia Conde (Spanish actress) (born 1979), Spanish actress
- Pia Conde (born 1970), Swedish journalist
- Pedro Conde (1785–1821), Argentine colonel
- Ramón Conde (1934–2020), Puerto Rican baseball player
- Rosina Conde (born 1954), Mexican narrator, playwright, and poet
- Tonín Conde (1909–1984), Spanish footballer and manager
- Wilman Conde (born 1982), Colombian retired footballer

== See also ==
- Condé (surname)
