= Maite Conde =

British Scholar

Maite Conde is Professor of Brazilian Studies and visual culture at the University of Cambridge and fellow of Jesus College, Cambridge. Educated in England and the United States, she has taught at UCLA, Oxford University, Columbia University in New York, and King’s College London as well as Cambridge. She has held visiting professorships at the Universidade de Sao Paulo, and Universidade Federal Fluminense in Brazil.

== Research ==
Maite Conde writes on cinema and culture in Brazil as well as on cultural theory. Her book, Foundational Films, Early Cinema and Modernity in Brazil, was awarded the Katherine Singer Kovacs Prize by the MLA for most outstanding book in the fields of Latin American and Spanish literatures and cultures. It received an honourable mention for Best Book in the Humanities by the Latin American Studies Association and was a finalist for the Richard Wall Memorial Award for Film and Theatre Studies. Her book Consuming Visions. Cinema, Writing and Modernity in Rio de Janeiro was awarded a PMLA prize for first time authors.

== Selected publications ==
- Between Conformity and Resistance. Essays on Culture, Politics and the State by Marilena Chaui (2011)
- Consuming Visions, Cinema, Writing and Modernity in Rio de Janeiro (2012)
- Foundational Films, Early Cinema and Modernity in Brazil (2018)
- On Global Cinema and Brazil by Paulo Emilio Salles Gomes (2018)
- Manifesting Democracy, Urban Protest and the Politics of Representation in Brazil Post 2013 (2022)
- The Oxford Handbook of Brazilian Cinema (2026)

== Personal Life ==
Maite Conde is the granddaughter of Antonio Conde Asperot, a teacher and key militant in Spain's Popular Front, an electoral alliance formed in 1936 of various left wing political organisations during Spain's second Republic, which was led by Manuel Azaña. Asperot was imprisoned and sentenced to be executed in 1936. His sentence was commuted in 1941 to life in prison. He was released in 1957. His qualifications were annulled and he was unable to teach, part of a purge on left wing educators by the Franco regime.
