= Condé-sur-Ifs =

- Commune
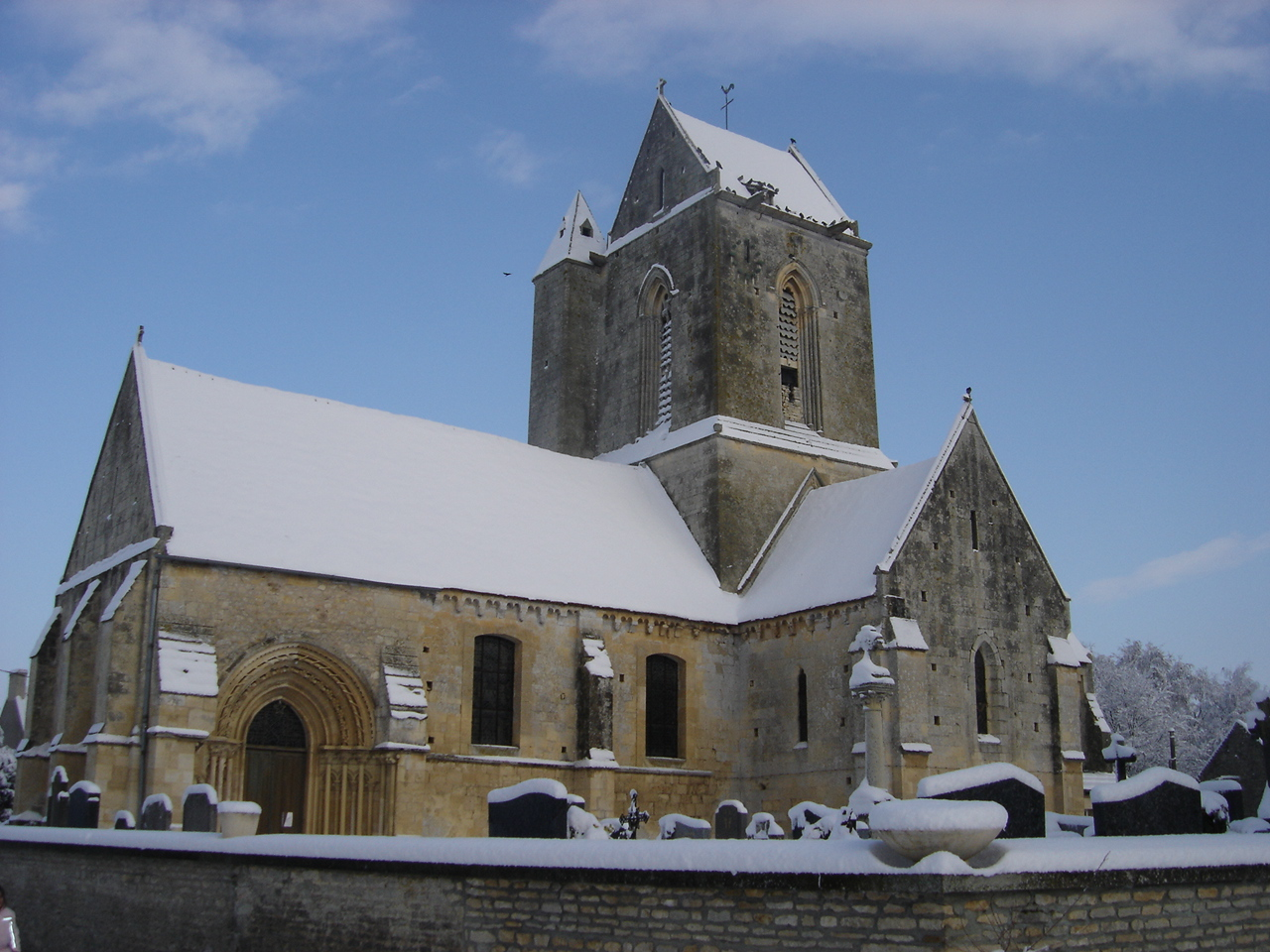
- The church in Condé-sur-Ifs
- Location of Condé-sur-Ifs
- Location within France Location within Normandy
- Coordinates: 49°02′37″N 0°07′32″W
- Country: France
- Region: Normandy
- Department: Calvados
- Arrondissement: Caen
- Canton: Mézidon Vallée d'Auge
- Intercommunality: CC Val ès Dunes

Government
  - Mayor (2020–2026): Laurent Declerck
- Area^{1}: 12 km^{2} (4.6 sq mi)
- Highest elevation: 81 m (266 ft)
- Lowest elevation: 28 m (92 ft)
- Population (2023): 454
  - Density: 38/km^{2} (98/sq mi)
- Time zone: UTC+01:00 (CET)
  - Summer (DST): UTC+02:00 (CEST)
- INSEE/Postal code: 14173 /14610
- ^{1} French Land Register data, which excludes lakes, ponds, glaciers > 1 km^{2} (0.386 sq mi or 247 acres) and river estuaries.

Condé-sur-Ifs (French pronunciation: [kɔ̃de syʁ if]) is a commune in the Calvados department, in the Normandy region in northwestern France.

== Geography ==
The commune is made up of the following collection of villages and hamlets, Glatigny, Le Bas de Condé, Ifs sur Laizon, Le Vey d'Ifs and Condé-sur-Ifs.

A single watercourse, the river Laizon flows through the commune.

== Population ==
Historical population
Year	Pop.	±% p.a.
1968	361	—
1975	324	−1.53%
1982	350	+1.11%
1990	368	+0.63%
1999	351	−0.52%
2007	399	+1.62%
2012	481	+3.81%
2017	445	−1.54%
2023	454	+0.33%
Source: INSEE

== Points of Interest ==
=== National Heritage sites ===
The Commune has three buildings and areas listed as a Monument historique

- Eglise Saint-Pierre et Saint-Martin twelfth century church listed as a monument in 1910.
- Menhir dit Pierre Cornue a Neolithic Menhir listed as a monument in 1889.
- Tumulus néolithique dit la Butte du Hu a Neolithic Tumulus that was classed as a Monument historique in 1974.

== See also ==
- Condé (disambiguation)
- Communes of the Calvados department
