= Sona Tata Condé =

Guinean musician

- Citizenship: Guinea
- Occupation: Musician

Sona Tata Condé is an internationally recognised Guinean musician. Sona Tata is a member of the Mandinka ethnic group. Sona Tata is widely popular in Guinea, especially in the capital Conakry. Sona Tata Condé recorded her afro-pop album Simbo which is named after her husband, in 2007. The title track, Simbo, is a love song to her husband and like many of her other songs, is not only sung in her native Malinke, but in other languages used in Guinea's capital, Conakry, including the Fula, Susu, French and English languages..
