= Josiah Conder (editor and author) =

British writer and abolitionist (1789–1855)

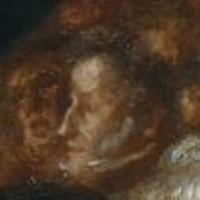
- Conder at the Anti-Slavery Convention, 1840
- Born: 1789; London, England
- Died: 1855 (aged 65–66); St John's Wood, Hampstead, England
- Occupation: Writer

Josiah Conder (17 September 1789 – 27 December 1855), was an abolitionist, author and hymn-writer from England. A correspondent of Robert Southey and well-connected to Romantic authors of his day, he was editor of the British literary magazine The Eclectic Review, the Nonconformist and abolitionist newspaper The Patriot, the author of romantic verses, poetry, and many popular hymns that survive to this day. His most ambitious non-fiction work was the thirty-volume worldwide geographical tome The Modern Traveller; and his best-selling compilation book The Congregational Hymn Book. Conder was a prominent London Congregationalist, an abolitionist, and took an active part in seeking to repeal British anti-Jewish laws.

== Early life ==
The fourth son of Thomas Conder, an active Nonconformist who worked in the City of London as an engraver and bookseller, Josiah was born on 17 September 1789 at his father's bookshop in Falcon Street. His grandfather, John Conder, was a Dissenting minister and President of Homerton College. His uncle was James Conder, a numismatist.

In his infancy, Josiah lost the vision in one eye due to smallpox. He was sent a few miles north of the City of London to the village of Hackney, for electrical treatment, a technique believed to be able to prevent the disease from spreading to also cause blindness in his other eye. He recovered, and continued to be educated at a dissenting academy in Hackney village, under the tutorship of Rev Mr Palmer.

At the age of ten his first essay were published in The Monthly Preceptor. At the age of fifteen, he began work as an assistant in his family's City bookshop. On reaching the age of 21 (in 1811), he took over the family business. A short time later, Josiah married Joan Elizabeth Thomas.

== Writing ==
Josiah Conder's work at the bookshop soon came to an end (c. 1819), after wider recognition of his literary talents had led to him being offered the editorship of The Eclectic Review, a prestigious literary journal that he continued to edit for twenty years (1814–37). With strong Congregational links, he was also invited to edit The Patriot, a newspaper that espoused nonconformist and evangelical causes, and for which he was editor for twenty-three years.

The Choir & The Oratory or Praise & Prayer, became noted for one poem, 'The Apocalypse', which earned him a place in English Romantic literature; its popularity prompted him to pen the commentary, The Harmony of History with Prophecy, and Explanation of the Apocalypse for the more interested of his readers.

In 1836 he edited the first hymnbook of the Congregationalist denomination, The Congregational Hymn Book, a Supplement to Dr. Watt's Psalms and Hymns; the book included 60 of his own texts, and four by his wife Joan.

Considered to reflect his evangelical and liberal, nondenominational, outlook, these hymns were widely adopted by churches and chapels throughout the western world. By the early twentieth century, some seventy years after his death, one biographer noted that more of Josiah Conder's hymns were in common use in Britain and the USA, than those of any other Congregational author except for the great Dr Isaac Watts and his friend Philip Doddridge.

== Political work for abolition ==
The painting which shows Allen at the 1840 Anti-Slavery Convention. Move your cursor to identify Conder who is a small figure near the speaker or click icon to enlarge

Josiah Conder's political work included a tract on the superior value of free labour over slave labour. In 1839, he became a founding Committee Member of the British and Foreign Anti-Slavery Society, which after a merge with the Aborigines' Protection Society and several changes of name is today known as Anti-Slavery International. In this role he was an organiser of, and delegate to, the world's first Anti-slavery convention, which was held in London in 1840 - an event depicted in a large painting by Benjamin Haydon that hangs in the National Portrait Gallery, London. His poem 'The Last Night of Slavery' dated 1 August 1834, evoking the horrors of the middle passage, was published in his collection, The Choir and the Oratory, or Praise and Prayer, 1837. It was republished in the anthology, Slavery, Abolition and Emancipation: writings in the British Romantic Period (London: Pickering & Chatto) in 1999. Josiah Conder's Biographical Sketch of the Late Thomas Pringle, the Secretary of the Anti-Slavery Society, was published in 1835, and widely sold bound together with Thomas Pringle's own Narrative of a Residence in South Africa (1834).

Shortly before his untimely death, Josiah Conder was prominent in the campaign to finance and make arrangements for Samuel Ringgold Ward, an African-American who escaped slavery in the US, to travel the length and breadth of Britain speaking to crowds to encourage support for the abolition of slavery in southern states of America, at a time when British foreign policy, as epitomised by Viscount Palmerston, was supportive of slavery in the US in marked contrast to its determined attempts to close down the supply and trade from West African chieftains, eventually isolating just the King of Dahomey and the Chief of Lagos. Samuel Ringgold Ward held a large meeting at Crosby Hall on 20 March 1854, to thank Josiah Conder and others in his close circle, mainly nonconformists such as Dr Thomas Binney and the Rev James Sherman who supported him in England in contrast to the double standards of government policy which prioritised cheap cotton from the southern slave states over African-American civil rights.

== Death and memorial ==
Josiah Conder died, aged 66, on 27 December 1855, at St John's Wood, Hampstead, following an attack of jaundice, and was buried at the Congregationalists' non-denominational garden cemetery, Abney Park Cemetery, Stoke Newington with a grey, polished granite, chest tomb as his monument.

His literary wife, Joan, died at age 91 in 1877; she is buried with him.

"He left five children, one of whom is a daughter. The four sons are, Mr. Francis R. Conder, a civil engineer and railway contractor; the Rev. Eustace R. Conder, Pastor of the Congregational Church at Poole; Mr. Josiah Conder of the Bank of England; and Mr Charles Conder, who is associated in professional pursuits with his eldest brother".

His son Eustace also wrote hymns.

== Works ==
=== The Modern Traveller ===
Although Josiah Conder never travelled abroad himself, he compiled all thirty volumes of The Modern Traveller, his non-fiction publishing epic covering the geography of many of the countries of the world. It sold well, but was outsold by his Congregational Hymn Book, some 90,000 copies of which were ordered in its first seven years.

=== Other books ===
- The Congregational Hymn Book, 1834
- The Withered Oak, 1805
- The Reverie, 1811
- The Star in the East, with Other Poems Chiefly Religious and Domestic, 1824
- Sacred Poems, Domestic Poems, and Miscellaneous Poems, 1824
- Josiah Conder (1834), Dictionary of Geography, Ancient and Modern, London: T. Tegg, OL 24340244M
- The Choir and the Oratory, 1836/7
- Analytical and Comparative View of All Religions Now Extant among Mankind, 1838 (Conder was the first European writer to distinguish between different traditions of non-European religion, in this work.)
- The Harmony of History with Prophecy, an explanation of the Apocalypse, 1849
- Hymns of Praise, Prayer, and Devout Meditation, 1856
- The Poet of the Sanctuary, I. Watts, 1851
- Pilgrim's Progress by John Bunyan, with a Life of the Author by Josiah Conder, 1838
- Narrative of a Residence in South Africa by Thomas Pringle, with a Life of the Author by Josiah Conder, 1835

=== Hymns ===
Among his hymns, the following are well-known:

- Baptised into our Saviour's death
- Be merciful, O God of Grace
- Beyond, beyond that boundless sea
- Blessed be God, He is not strict
- Bread of heaven, on Thee we feed
- Comrades of the heavenly calling
- Day by day the manna fell
- Followers of Christ of every name
- Forever will I bless the Lord
- Grant me, heavenly Lord, to feel
- The Lord is King! lift up thy voice
- Thou art the Everlasting Word
- 'Tis not that I did choose Thee
