= Ibrahim Jaffa Condeh =

Ibrahim Jaffa Condeh (born in Kabala, Sierra Leone) is a Sierra Leonean journalist and news anchor. He is the senior journalist for the Freetown based Concord Times newspaper. Although Condeh is primarily based in Freetown, he often report on location for breaking news stories throughout Sierra Leone. He is a graduate of Fourah Bay College with a master's degree in journalism (FBC). Condeh is a Muslim and a member of the Mandingo ethnic group.
