= Conder token =

18th-century token coinage in the British Isles

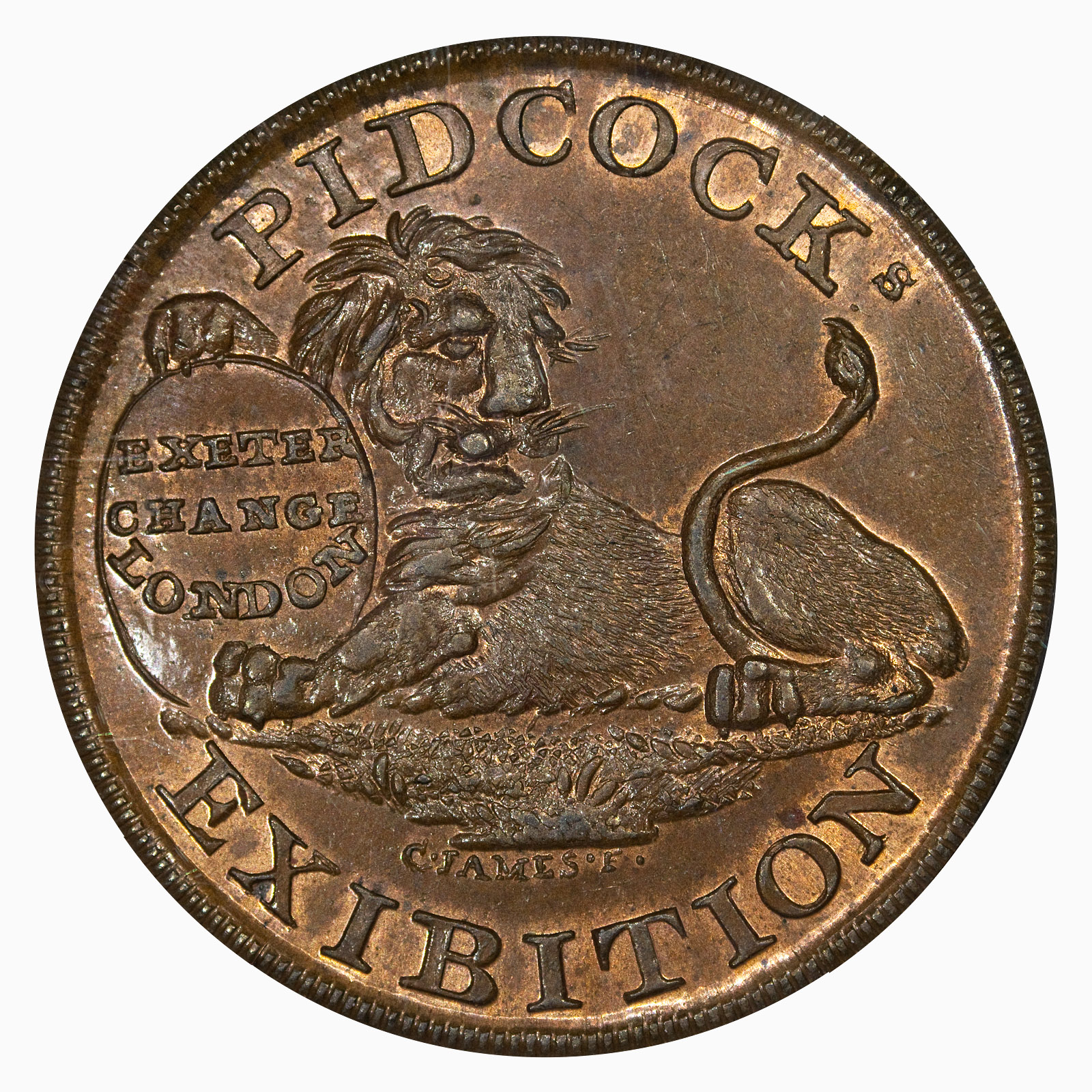
Obverse

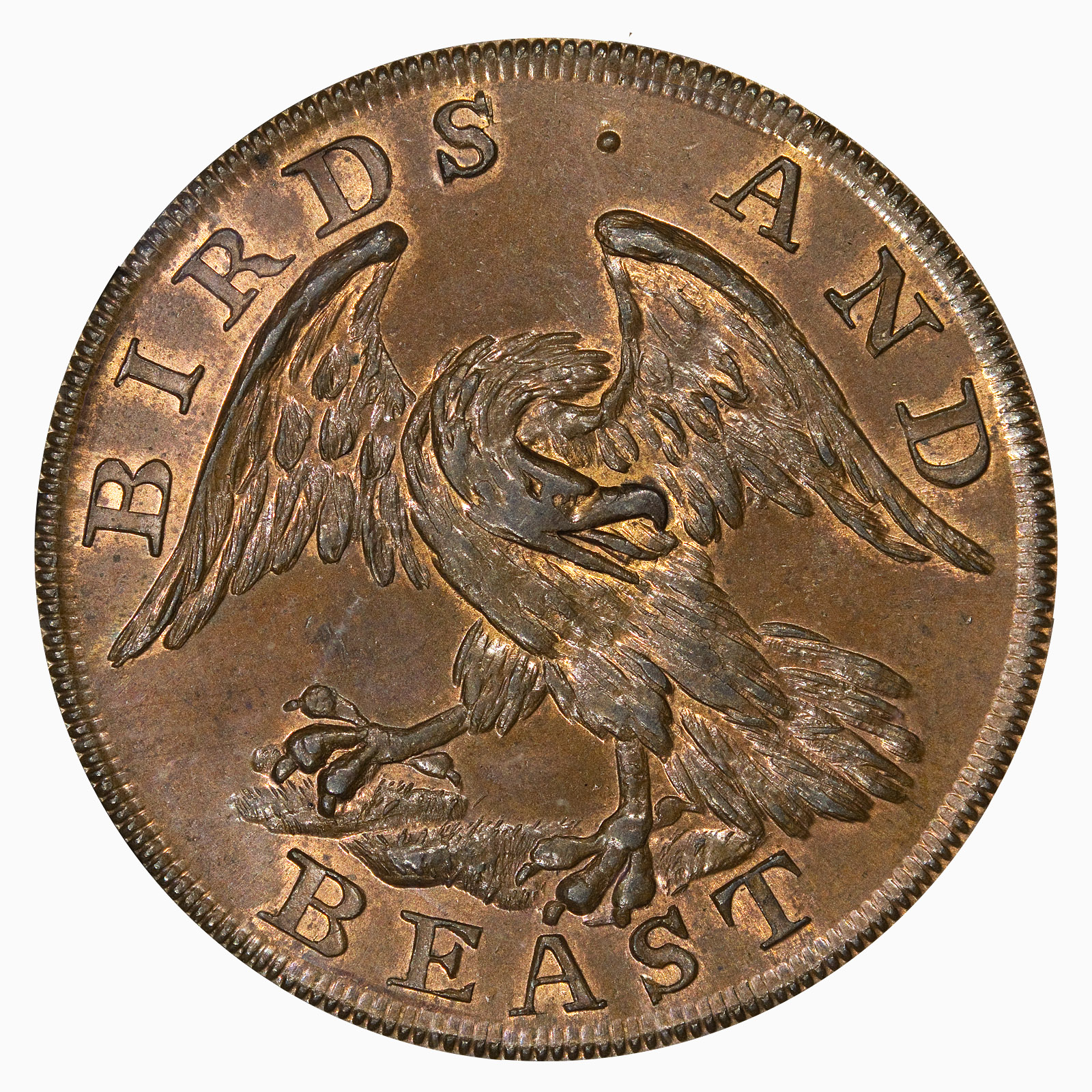
Reverse

A token struck in the 1790s to advertise the menagerie of wild animals of Mr. Gilbert Pidcock, at Exeter Change, in the Strand.

Conder tokens, also known as 18th-century provincial tokens, were a form of privately minted token coinage struck and used during the later part of the 18th century and the early part of the 19th century in England and Wales (including Anglesey), Scotland, and Ireland.

The driving force behind the need for token coinage was the shortage of small denomination coins for everyday transactions. However, the demand was fueled by other factors such as the Industrial Revolution, population growth, and the preponderance of counterfeit circulating coins. Because the government made little effort to ameliorate this shortage, private business owners and merchants took matters into their own hands, and the first tokens of this type were issued in 1787 to pay workers at the Mine Company. By 1795, millions of tokens of a few thousand varying designs had been struck and were in common use throughout Great Britain.

Collecting Conder tokens has been popular since shortly after they were first manufactured, resulting in the availability today of many highly preserved examples for collectors. The demarcation of what is or is not considered a Conder token is somewhat unclear; however, most collectors consider Conder tokens to include those indexed originally by James Conder or later by Dalton & Hamer.

== History ==
=== Coin shortage ===
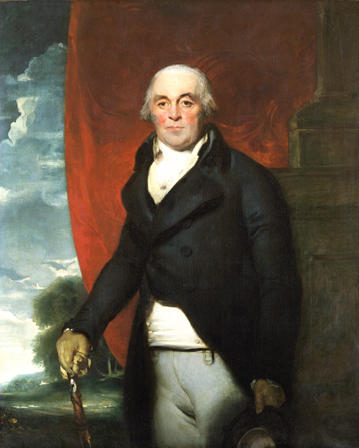
Thomas Williams, the "Copper King" of Parys Mountain

In Great Britain, a shortage of small denomination coinage had been reported as early as the late 14th century. Such a shortage made it difficult for workers to be paid, and for transactions of daily life to be carried out. The shortages persisted and worsened through the late 17th century and became particularly problematic by the middle of the 18th century. The shortage of small denomination coinage reached a critical mass with the move of many workers away from agricultural jobs and into the work force in factories during the Industrial Revolution. The growing payrolls of factories were nearly impossible to meet for employers with no supply of coins. At the same time, the population growth rate of Great Britain between 1750 and 1800 nearly quadrupled. The situation was only made worse by the outflow of British silver coins via Gresham's law, the preponderance of counterfeit copper coins in circulation, and the Royal Mint's sporadic production of non-gold coins from the late 17th century to the late 18th century. For many years, no copper or silver coins were minted at all, and in 1775 King George III had halted the production of copper coinage at the Royal Mint.

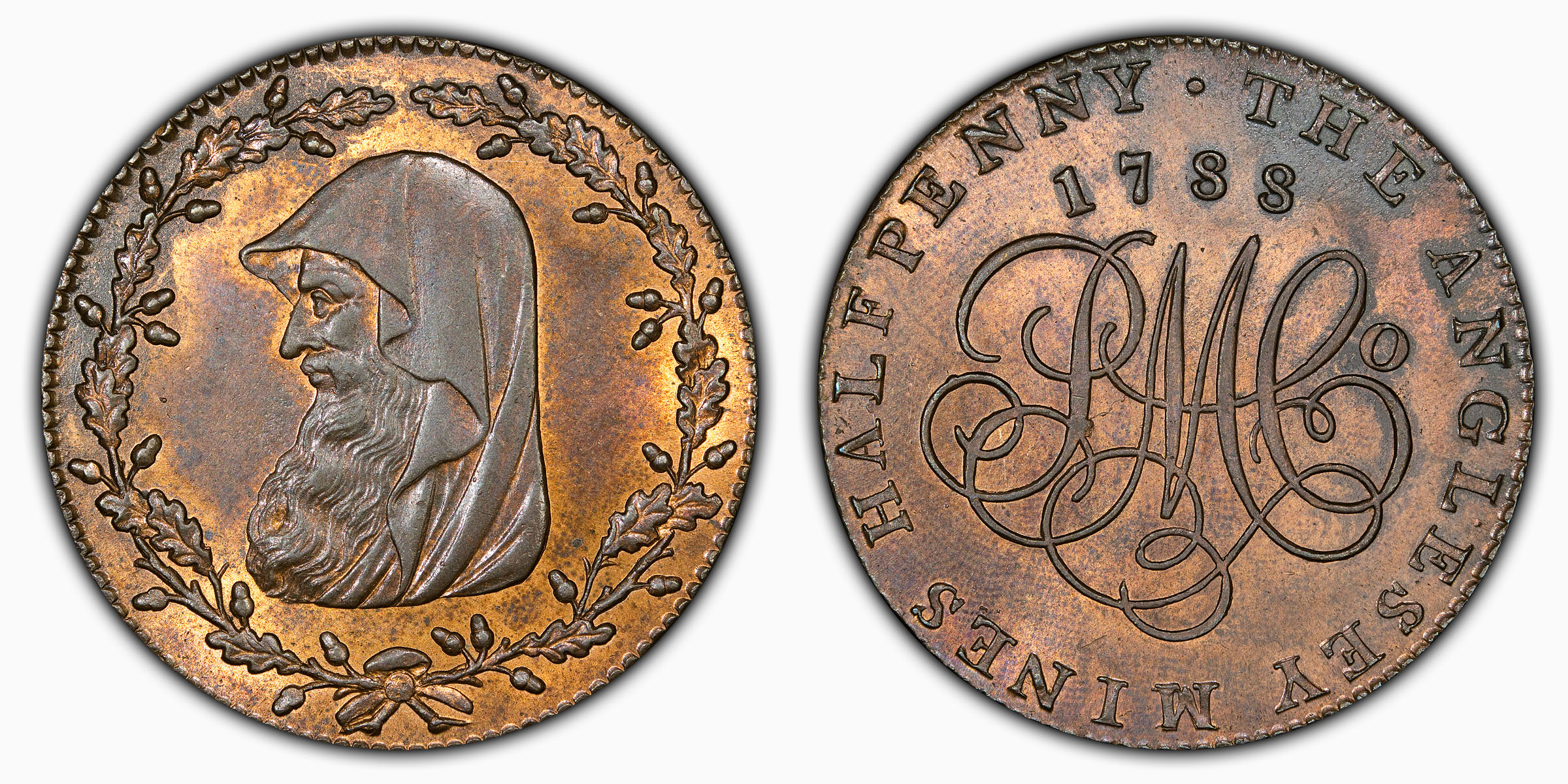
A halfpenny token issued by the Parys Mine Company of Anglesey in 1788. The hooded druid design was used for many years, and was the first of hundreds of token designs.

In 1768, one of the largest veins of copper in the world was found at Parys Mountain on the island of Anglesey in the northwest of Wales. In 1785, Thomas Williams (the "Copper King"), acting as a representative of the Parys Mine Company, met with the master of the British mint to propose that regal copper coins be struck using a counterfeit-deterrent method of edge lettering, and offering this technology to the mint free of charge. The stipulation was that the supply of the copper for these new coins would come from the Parys Mine Company. The British mint master did not entertain the offer. By 1786, two-thirds of the coins in circulation in Britain were counterfeit, and the Royal Mint responded by shutting itself down, worsening the situation. Few of the silver coins being passed were genuine. Even the copper coins were melted down and replaced with lightweight fakes. The Royal Mint struck no copper coins for 48 years, from 1773 until 1821. On the rare occasions when the Royal Mint did strike coins, they were relatively crude, with quality control nonexistent. In February 1787 Williams oversaw the minting of the first of many privately issued copper tokens, some being used to pay workers at the Parys Mine Company. These first tokens bore the image of a hooded Druid, and within two months time were receiving attention in London as a possible solution to the shortage of small denomination coin. Not long after the appearance of the Druid tokens, other cities, businesses, and proprietors would follow suit and begin designing and minting their own small denomination coinage.

=== Matthew Boulton and The Soho Mint ===
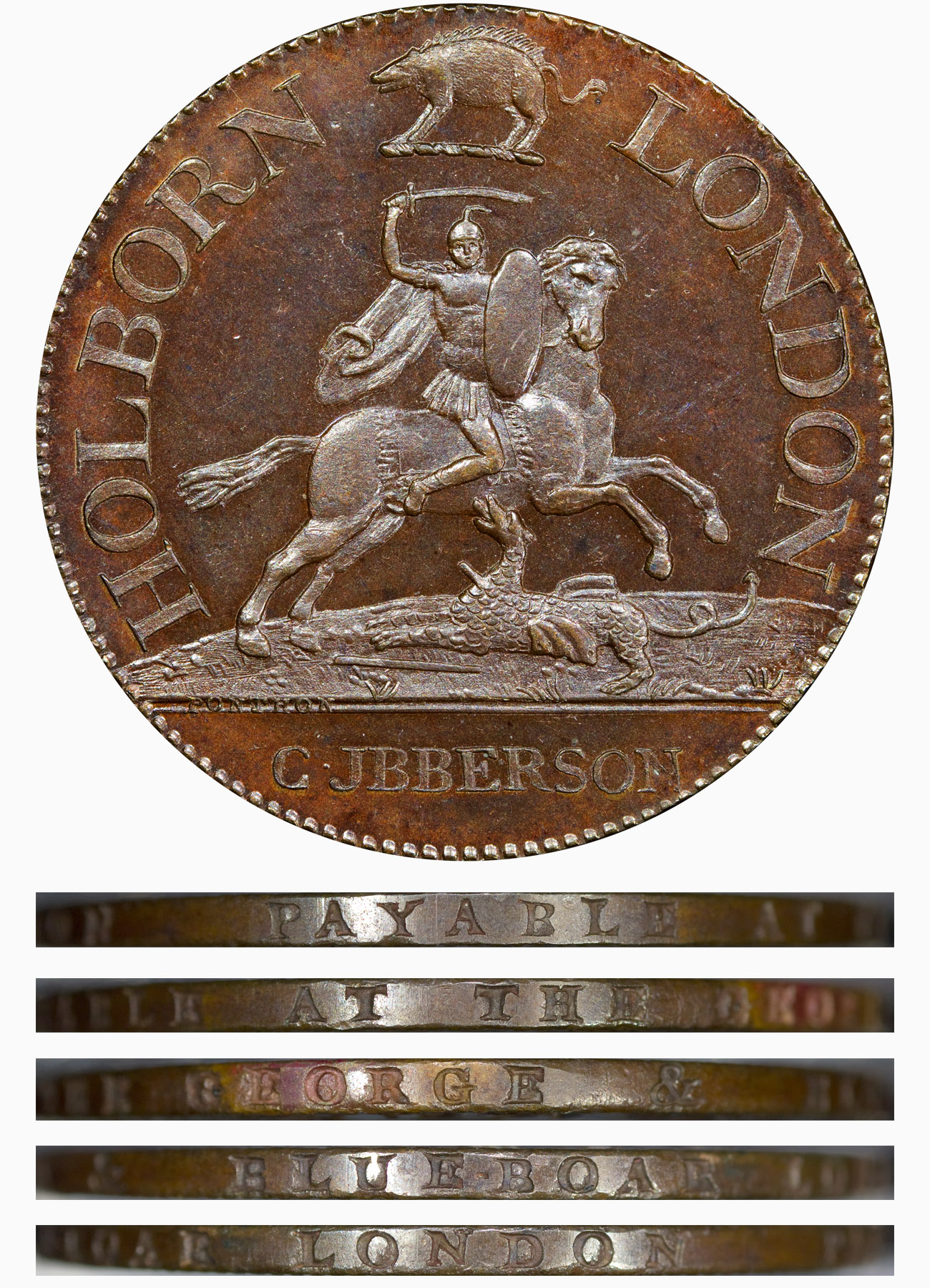
A token minted by Boulton in late 1794 for the proprietor Christopher Ibberson. Note the edge lettering stating "PAYABLE AT THE GEORGE & BLUEBOAR LONDON".

The demand for small denomination coin flourished, and with it the popularity of copper tokens that approximated the size of the halfpenny grew rapidly. One of the most prolific producers of these private tokens (struck on behalf of merchants) was Matthew Boulton. In fact, during his lifetime Boulton would strike millions of these merchant pieces. Boulton was no stranger to the manufacture of small metal items, having grown up with and managed his family business for many years, which specialized in buckles. In the mid-1780s Boulton had turned his attention to coinage; in his eyes coins and tokens were just another small metal product like those he had manufactured for years. He also had shares in several Cornish copper mines, and had a large personal stock of copper, purchased when the mines were unable to dispose of it elsewhere. However, when orders for counterfeit money were sent to him, he refused them: "I will do anything, short of being a common informer against particular persons, to stop the malpractices of the Birmingham coiners." In 1788, he established the Soho Mint as part of his industrial plant. The mint included eight steam-driven presses, each striking between 70 and 84 coins per minute.

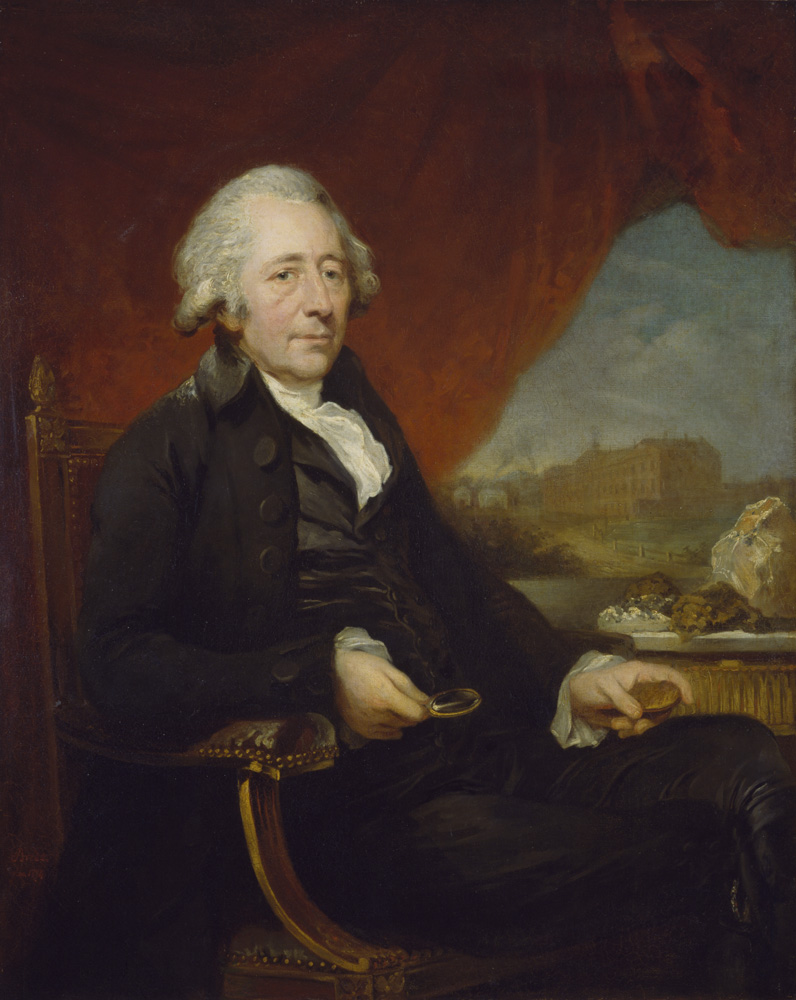
Matthew Boulton in 1792

Boulton spent much time in London lobbying for a contract to strike British coins, but in June 1790 the William Pitt Government postponed a decision on recoinage indefinitely. Meanwhile, the Soho Mint struck coins for the East India Company, Sierra Leone and Russia, while producing high-quality planchets, or blank coins, to be struck by national mints elsewhere. The firm sent over 20 million blanks to Philadelphia, to be struck into cents and half-cents by the United States Mint. Tokens were also made for private release in the United States, notably the Talbot, Allum & Lee "cents" of 1794.

The national financial crisis reached a point of despair in February 1797, when the Bank of England stopped redeeming its bills for gold. In an effort to get more money into circulation, the Government adopted a plan to issue large quantities of copper coins, and Lord Hawkesbury summoned Boulton to London on 3 March 1797, informing him of the Government's plan, and he was awarded a contract at the end of the month. According to a proclamation dated 26 July 1797, King George III was "graciously pleased to give directions that measures might be taken for an immediate supply of such copper coinage as might be best adapted to the payment of the laborious poor in the present exigency". The proclamation required that the coins weigh one and two ounces respectively, bringing the intrinsic value of the coins close to their face value. With the return of large quantities of government issued small denomination coin (twopence and pennies were minted at the Soho Mint in 1797, and halfpennies and farthings followed in 1799), the need for locally issued token coinage waned.

=== The return of government coinage ===
By 1802, the production of privately issued provincial tokens had ceased. However, in the next ten years the intrinsic value of copper rose. The return of privately minted token coinage was evident by 1811 and endemic by 1812, as more and more of the Government issued copper coinage was melted down for trade. The Royal Mint undertook a massive recoinage programme in 1816, with large quantities of gold and silver coin being minted. To thwart the further issuance of private token coinage, in 1817 an act of parliament was passed which forbade the manufacture of private token coinage under very severe penalties. The Truck Act 1831 finally banned employers paying their workers using tokens.

== Collecting ==
=== Early collectors ===
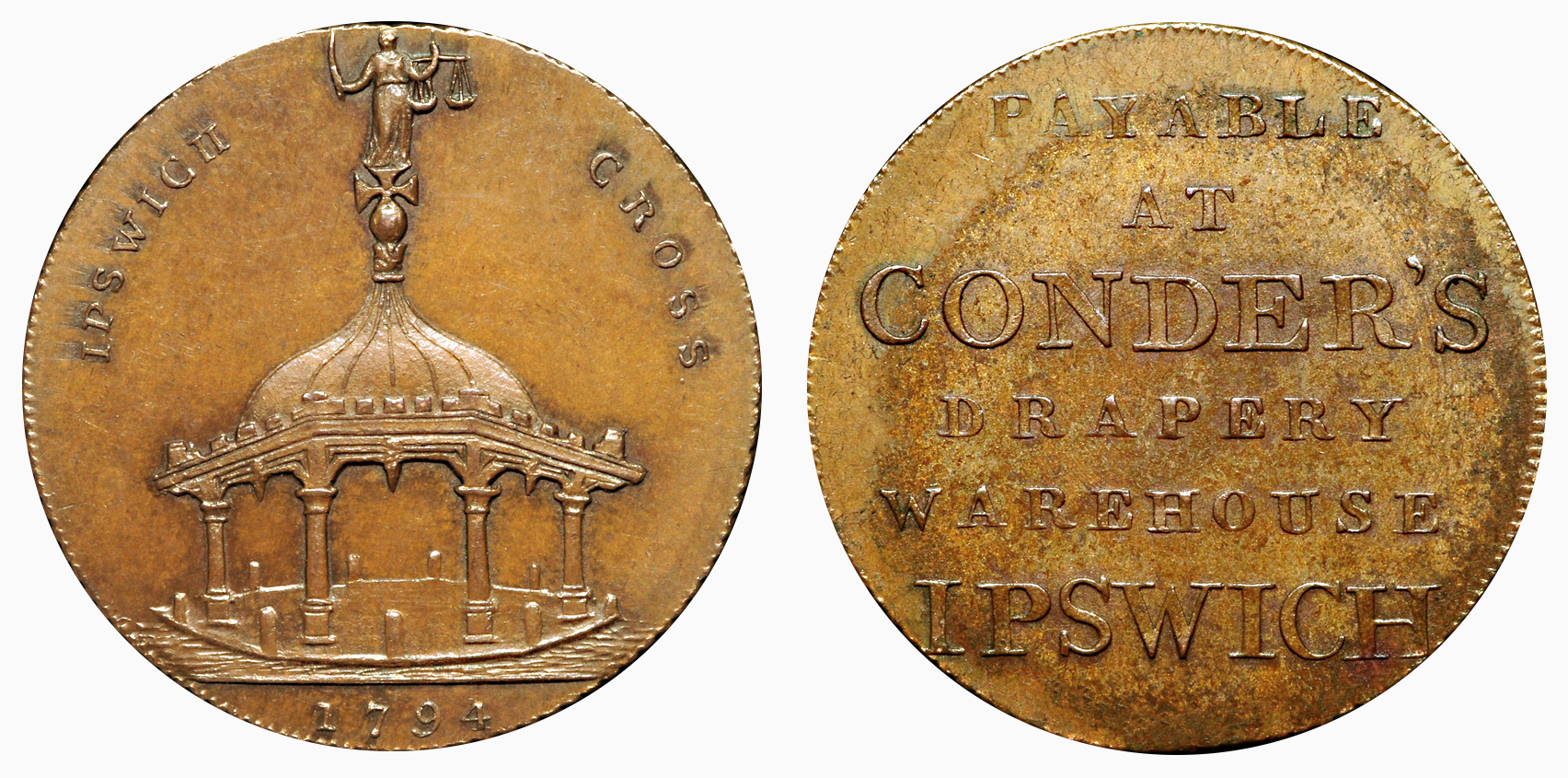
A token issued by James Conder in 1794

Early on, the issue of private token coinage served a purpose to ease everyday transactions. But, by 1793, the hobby of collecting and trading various tokens achieved widespread popularity. Most tokens issued in the early years were primarily intended for circulation. However, manufacturers soon found that issuing token designs in very limited mintage meant they could be sold directly to collectors at tidy profits. A few enterprising collectors even funded the issue of very small mintage tokens of their own design. These self-made "rare" tokens would then be used to trade with other collectors in an attempt to fill their collections with as many varieties as possible. As evidence of the collecting craze, three extensive reference works on the indexing and collecting of provincial tokens were published before 1800 by Pye (first edition in 1795), Birchall (1796), and Conder (1798). None of these three published works were undertaken by accomplished numismatic researchers, but instead were undertaken out of personal interest and were largely based on the personal collections of the authors. Because of the widespread "collecting mania", a great number of extremely well preserved tokens survive today, having been tucked away in private collections for decades.

=== Topics and designs ===
Because Conder tokens were minted independently of government, the creators of these tokens had the freedom to make political statements and social commentary, to honour great men, ideals, great events, or to simply advertise their businesses. Subjects range from Isaac Newton to Abolition, Prisons and Mental Institutions to circus performers. Issuers of the coins needed only have the means and the will to mint their own coin. Many tokens were officially payable only in certain areas and locations, but there is no doubt that these copper promissory tokens were treated as official copper coin by many at the time and they circulated widely. By 1795, there were thousands of different designs circulating, the great majority of these tokens being halfpennies.

== Cataloging and attribution ==
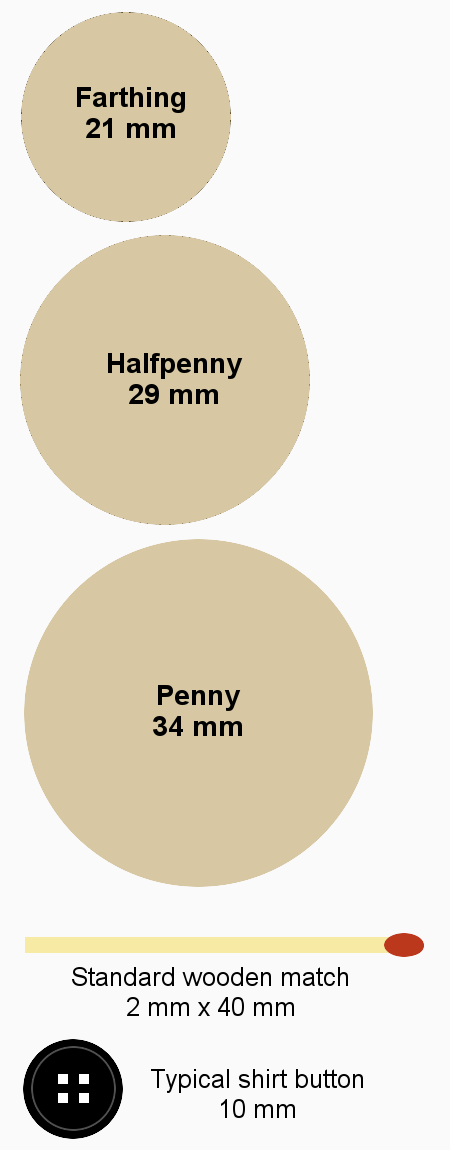
A depiction of the approximate diameters of token farthings, halfpennies, and pennies issued from 1787 to 1802. The size of a standard wooden matchstick and a typical shirt button are shown for comparison.

Conder tokens are named after James Conder who was an early collector and cataloguer of these tokens. Building on the work of Conder and a few other intermediary reference works, the definitive and exhaustive work on attributing Conder tokens used by modern collectors is that of Dalton and Hamer. Each token is identified based on one of four large geographic regions (England, Anglesey and Wales, Scotland, and Ireland), then further by county. Within the county of issue, each unique combination of obverse and reverse design is assigned a number (referred to as the D&H number), and variations in edge lettering are further differentiated by a lower case letter following the number designation. In general, the tokens are organized within each county such that pennies are listed first (lowest D&H numbers), then halfpennies, and finally farthings (highest D&H numbers). It is also quite common for collectors to refer to a token by the specific city, business, or series of the issue within the larger county category. A few tokens were issued in denominations other than the penny, halfpenny, and farthing, and these less common denominations are also indexed in Dalton and Hamer. The vast majority of tokens indexed in D&H from the period were struck in copper, even those in odd denominations of threepence, one shilling, and others.

=== Dalton and Hamer classifications ===
England Anglesey & Wales Scotland Ireland

Order	County	No. of tokens	Dalton & Hamer numbers			
Order	County	No. of tokens	Penny	Halfpenny	Farthing	Other
1	Bedfordshire	5		1-5		
2	Berkshire	1		1		
3	Buckinghamshire	29	1	2-28	29	
4	Cambridgeshire	28	1-11	12-35	36-38	
5	Cheshire	29	1-3	4-81	82-88	
6	Cornwall	4		1-4		
7	Cumberland	3	1	2-3		
8	Derbyshire	3		1-3		
9	Devonshire	11		1-8	9-11	
10	Dorsetshire	12		1-9	10-12	
11	Durham	11	1-3	4-11		
12	Essex	43	2	3-41	42-43	1 (shilling)
13	Gloucestershire	77	1-21	22-65	66-77	
14	Hampshire	117	2-8	9-94	95-117	1 (shilling)
15	Herefordshire	6	1-4	5-6		
16	Hertfordshire	5	1	2-4	5	
17	Kent	42	1-2	3-42		
18	Lancashire	157	1-7	8-150	151-157	
19	Leicestershire	2		1-2		
20	Lincolnshire	8		1-8		
21	Middlesex	1174	6-245	246-1052	1053-1174	1-5 (various)
22	Monmouthshire	3	1-3			
23	Norfolk	55	2-4	5-54	55	1 (3 pence)
24	Northamptonshire	1		1		
25	Northumberland	35	1-2	3-27	28-35	
26	Nottinghamshire	10	5	6-10		1-4 (various)
27	Oxfordshire	1		1		
28	Rutlandshire	1		1		
29	Shropshire	28		1-27	28	
30	Somersetshire	123	1-23	24-110	111-123	
31	Staffordshire	30	1-9	10-28	27-30	
32	Suffolk	40	1-15	16-40		
33	Surrey	24	1-2	3-15	16-24	
34	Sussex	41		1-41		
35	Warwickshire	485	6-44	45-474	475-485	1-5 (various)
36	Westmoreland	7	1-2	3-7		
37	Wiltshire	21		1-21		
38	Worcestershire	47	1-6	7-46	47	
39	Yorkshire	70	1-7	8-70		
40	Anglesey	467	1-265	266-451	452-467	
41	Wales	36		1-13	14-36	
42	Carmarthenshire	7		1-7		
43	Carnarvonshire	1		1		
44	Glamorganshire	4		1-4		
45	Pembrokeshire	1			1	
46	Aberdeenshire	1		1		
47	Angusshire	43	5-6	7-36	37-43	1-4 (shillings)
48	Argyleshire	2	1-2			
49	Ayrshire	9	1	2-8	9	
50	Dumfriesshire	1			1	
51	Fifeshire	16	1	2-3	4-16	
52	Haddingtonshire	4			1-4	
53	Inverness-shire	5		1-5		
54	Kinross-shire	1	1			
55	Kirkcudbrightshire	1		1		
56	Lanarkshire	54	1	2-9	10-54	
57	Linlithgowshire	5			1-5	
58	Lothian	150		1-61	62-150	
59	Perthshire	11		1-10	11	
60	Renfrewshire	6	1-2		3-6	
61	Roxburghshire	1			1	
62	Selkirkshire	1			1	
63	Not Local	8			1-8	
64	Cork	19		1-19		
65	Drogheda	6		1-6		
66	Dublin	466	1-4	5-381	382-411	411-466 (leaden)
67	Galway	1		1		
68	King's County	4				1-4 (thirteen pence)
69	Munster	19		1-19		
70	Tipperary	1		1		
71	Wexford	18		1-18		
72	Wicklow	77		1-77		

=== Rarity of tokens ===
When originally published, Dalton and Hamer assigned rarity information to each token based on the number minted with each die pairing, and with each edge type. Over time some of these estimates have been found to be overestimates of mintages, whereas others have underestimated mintages. Tokens are classified into large groups called "Common", "Scarce", "Rare", "Very Rare", and "Extremely Rare". While some tokens are classified as rare based only on their varied edge lettering, the more sought after tokens are those with very small mintages of a particular obverse and/or reverse design.

== See also ==
- Local currency
- Private currency
