= John Conder =

- Born: 3 June 1714; Wimpole, England
- Died: 30 May 1781 (aged 66); London, England
- Burial place: London, England

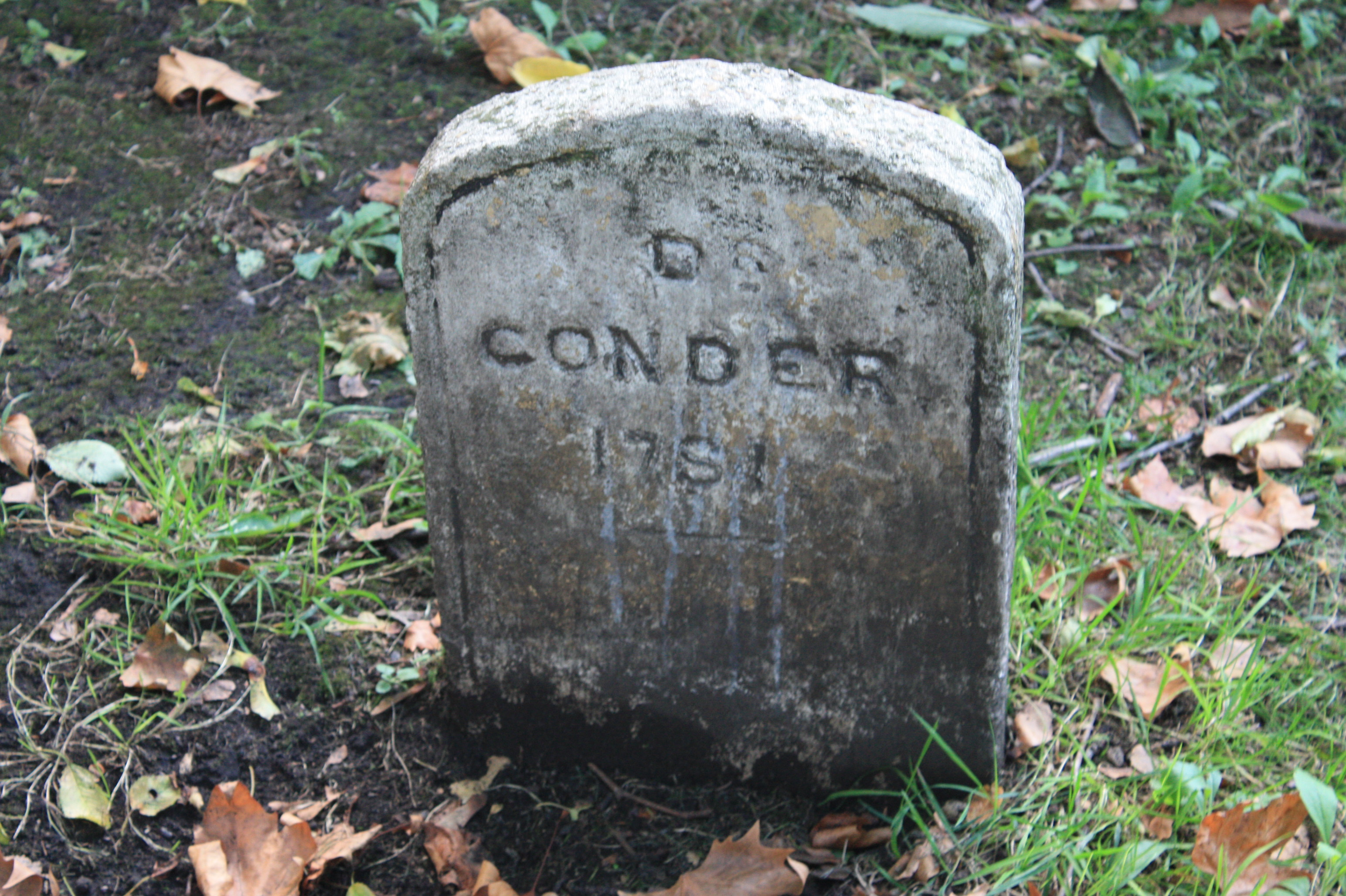
Dr John Conder's original stone, Bunhill Fields, London

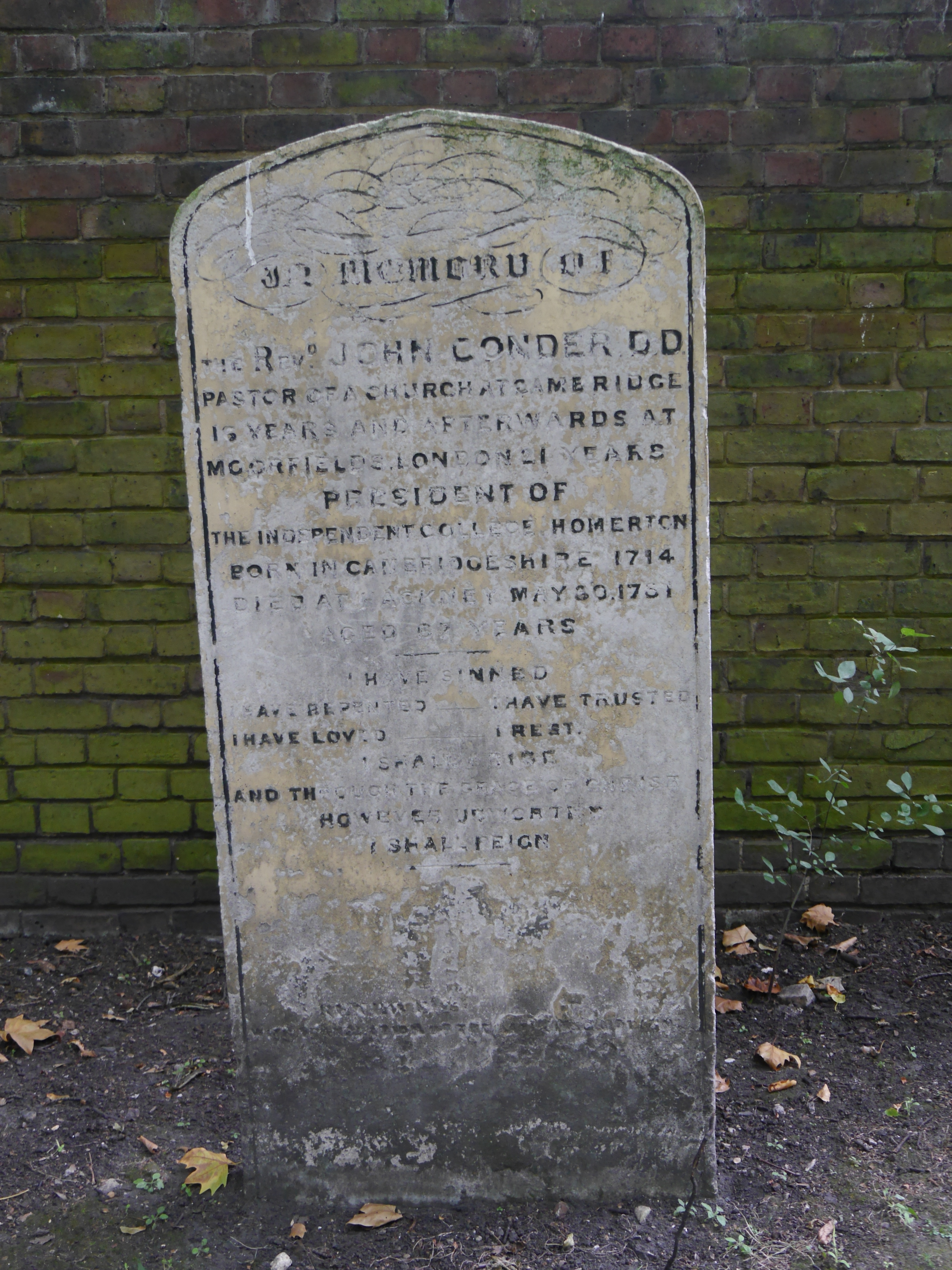
The improved gravestone on Conder's grave

John Conder D.D. (3 June 1714 – 30 May 1781) was an Independent minister at Cambridge who later became President of the Independent College, Homerton in the parish of Hackney near London. John Conder was the theological tutor at Plaisterers' Hall Academy in 1754; and residential tutor and theological tutor at Mile End Academy (1754 to 1769), then the theological tutor at Homerton Academy (1769 to 1781).

== Life ==
John Conder was born in Wimpole in Cambridgeshire on 3 June 1714. Both his father, Jabez Conder (d. 1727) and grandfather served as minister to an Independent congregation at Croydon, Cambridgeshire. At the time, the nonconformists were in great fear because of Parliament's Schism Bill under Queen Anne, passed as the never-enforced Schism Act 1714. Following the accession of George I in 1714, a degree of religious toleration was won for nonconformists, though with a number of legal restrictions and disadvantages that continued into the nineteenth century.

Conder's first sermon as an Independent was preached in 1738 and he developed a successful ministry at Cambridge, at the Hog Hill church. In 1754, he left to take up an appointment as President of the Independent College at Homerton, near London. In 1762, he was accepted as pastor of a chapel at Moorfields in the City of London, where he served for a twenty-one years as minister.

== Works ==
Conder wrote a number of works and hymns, including Christ watches o'er the embers..., although his grandson Josiah Conder was the more prolific hymn writer in the family.

Conder died in Hackney in London in 1781 and was buried in the Nonconformist cemetery of Bunhill Fields. His grave was originally marked by a very simple stone simply stating "Dr Conder 1781". An improved stone was added around twenty years later, which includes a verse written by Conder. The stones lie in the northern spur of the T-plan cemetery, against the west wall.

A self-penned epitaph read:

Peccavi, Resipui, Confidi, Amavi, Requiesco, Resurgam. Et ex gratia Christi, ut ut indignus, regnabo.

== Notes ==
Attribution This article incorporates text from a publication now in the public domain: "Conder, John". Dictionary of National Biography. London: Smith, Elder & Co. 1885–1900.
