= Condé-sur-Risle =

- Commune
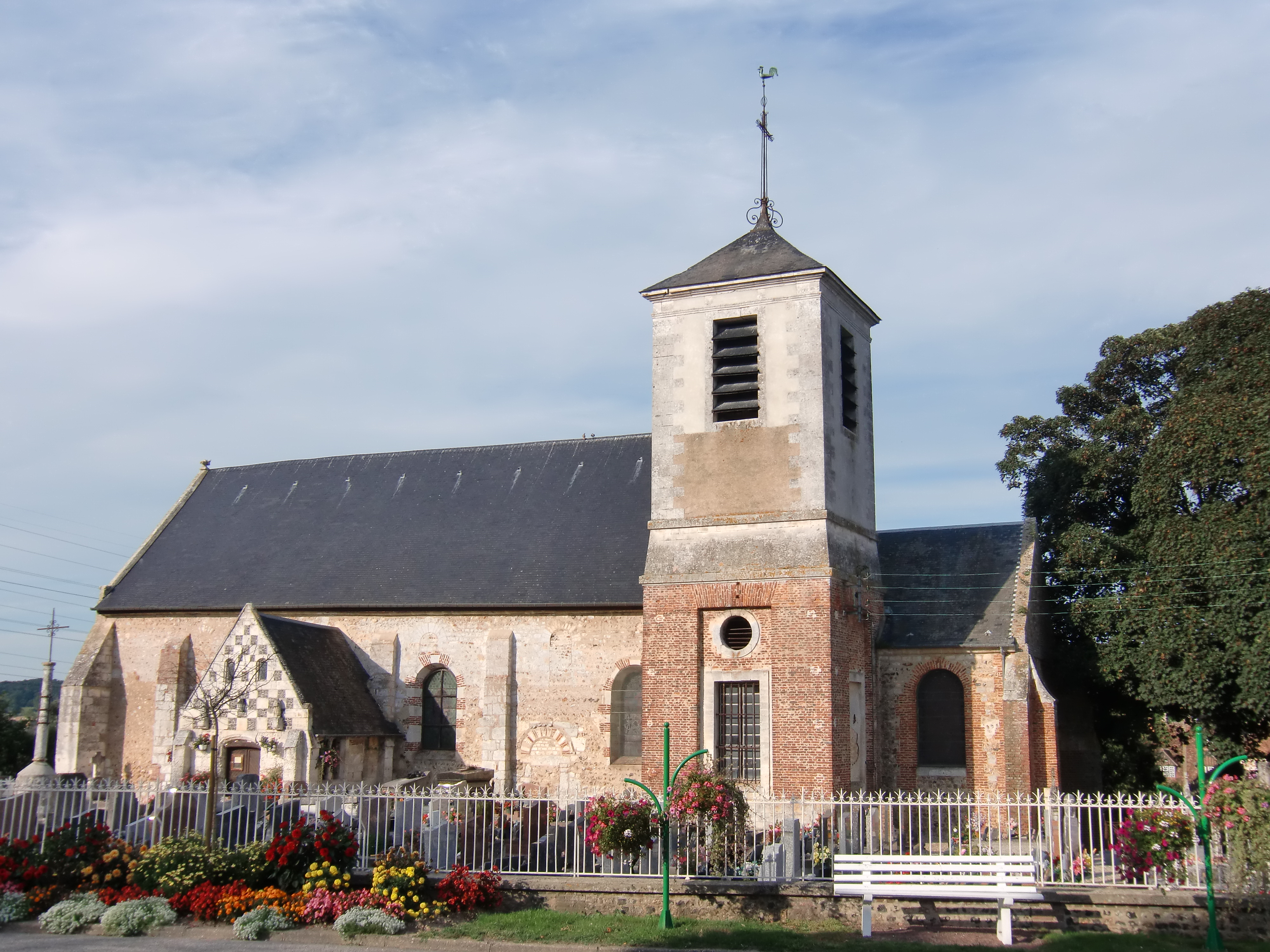
- The church in Condé-sur-Risle
- Location of Condé-sur-Risle
- Location within France Location within Normandy
- Coordinates: 49°18′52″N 0°37′02″E
- Country: France
- Region: Normandy
- Department: Eure
- Arrondissement: Bernay
- Canton: Pont-Audemer

Government
  - Mayor (2020–2026): Dominique Leroy
- Area^{1}: 9.87 km^{2} (3.81 sq mi)
- Elevation: 26 m (85 ft)
- Highest elevation: 127 m (417 ft)
- Lowest elevation: 17 m (56 ft)
- Population (2023): 652
  - Density: 66.1/km^{2} (171/sq mi)
- Time zone: UTC+01:00 (CET)
  - Summer (DST): UTC+02:00 (CEST)
- INSEE/Postal code: 27167 /27290
- ^{1} French Land Register data, which excludes lakes, ponds, glaciers > 1 km^{2} (0.386 sq mi or 247 acres) and river estuaries.

Condé-sur-Risle (French pronunciation: [kɔ̃de syʁ ʁil]) is a commune in the Eure department in northern France.

== Geography ==
The commune along with another 69 communes shares part of a 4,747 hectare, Natura 2000 conservation area, called Risle, Guiel, Charentonne.

== Population ==
Historical population
Year	Pop.	±% p.a.
1968	406	—
1975	337	−2.63%
1982	363	+1.07%
1990	377	+0.47%
1999	454	+2.09%
2007	523	+1.78%
2012	594	+2.58%
2017	639	+1.47%
2023	652	+0.34%
Source: INSEE

== See also ==
- Communes of the Eure department
