= L'Hôtellerie =

- Commune
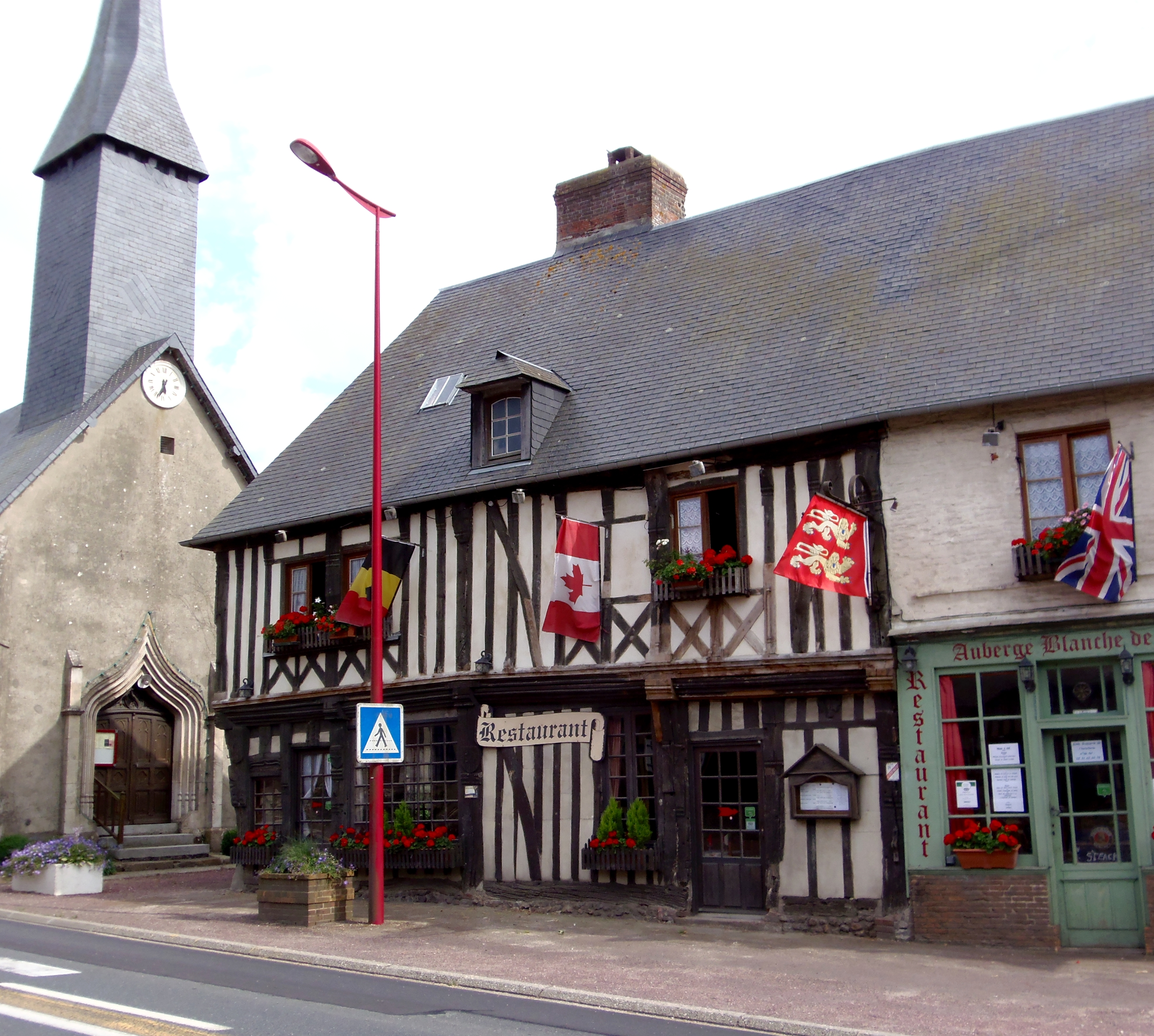
- The manor of Blanche de Castille
- Location of L'Hôtellerie
- Location within France Location within Normandy
- Coordinates: 49°08′32″N 0°24′25″E
- Country: France
- Region: Normandy
- Department: Calvados
- Arrondissement: Lisieux
- Canton: Lisieux
- Intercommunality: CA Lisieux Normandie

Government
  - Mayor (2020–2026): Michèle Ressencourt
- Area^{1}: 5.74 km^{2} (2.22 sq mi)
- Elevation: 161 m (528 ft)
- Highest elevation: 177 m (581 ft)
- Lowest elevation: 124 m (407 ft)
- Population (2023): 313
  - Density: 54.5/km^{2} (141/sq mi)
- Time zone: UTC+01:00 (CET)
  - Summer (DST): UTC+02:00 (CEST)
- INSEE/Postal code: 14334 /14100
- ^{1} French Land Register data, which excludes lakes, ponds, glaciers > 1 km^{2} (0.386 sq mi or 247 acres) and river estuaries.

L'Hôtellerie (French pronunciation: [lotɛlʁi]) is a commune in the Calvados department in the Normandy region in northwestern France.

== Population ==
Historical population
Year	Pop.	±% p.a.
1968	212	—
1975	213	+0.07%
1982	214	+0.07%
1990	217	+0.17%
1999	188	−1.58%
2007	297	+5.88%
2012	332	+2.25%
2017	313	−1.17%
2023	313	+0.00%
Source: INSEE

== See also ==
- Communes of the Calvados department
