= Courtonne-la-Meurdrac =

- Commune
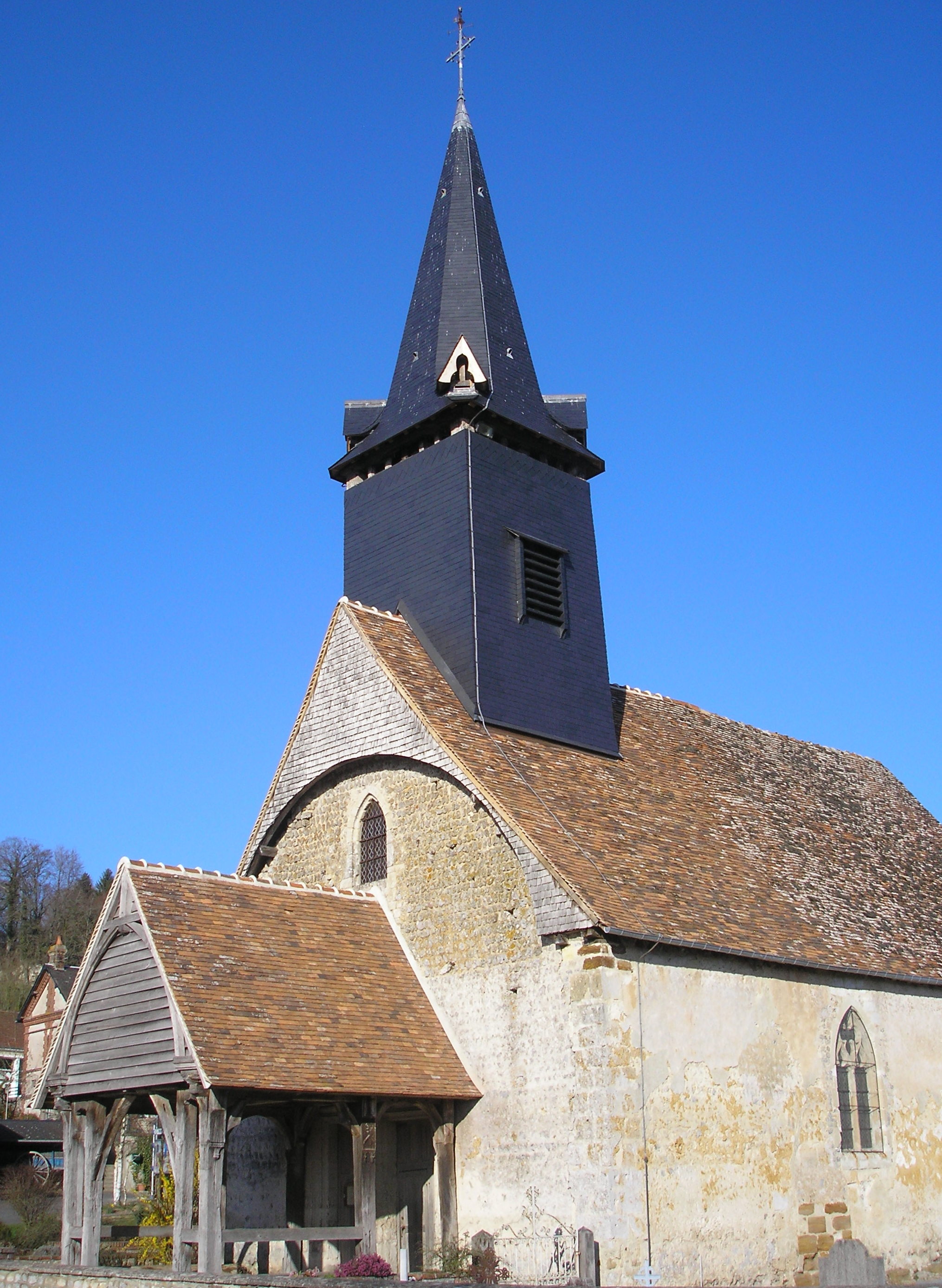
- The church in Courtonne-la-Meurdrac
- Location of Courtonne-la-Meurdrac
- Location within France Location within Normandy
- Coordinates: 49°07′34″N 0°19′15″E
- Country: France
- Region: Normandy
- Department: Calvados
- Arrondissement: Lisieux
- Canton: Lisieux
- Intercommunality: CA Lisieux Normandie

Government
  - Mayor (2020–2026): Éric Boisnard
- Area^{1}: 12.69 km^{2} (4.90 sq mi)
- Elevation: 87 m (285 ft)
- Highest elevation: 174 m (571 ft)
- Lowest elevation: 64 m (210 ft)
- Population (2023): 683
  - Density: 53.8/km^{2} (139/sq mi)
- Time zone: UTC+01:00 (CET)
  - Summer (DST): UTC+02:00 (CEST)
- INSEE/Postal code: 14193 /14100
- ^{1} French Land Register data, which excludes lakes, ponds, glaciers > 1 km^{2} (0.386 sq mi or 247 acres) and river estuaries.

Courtonne-la-Meurdrac is a commune in the Calvados department in the Normandy region in northwestern France.

== Population ==
Historical population
Year	Pop.	±% p.a.
1968	538	—
1975	445	−2.67%
1982	569	+3.57%
1990	609	+0.85%
1999	654	+0.80%
2007	699	+0.84%
2012	693	−0.17%
2017	663	−0.88%
2023	683	+0.50%
Source: INSEE

== See also ==
- Courtonne-les-Deux-Églises
- Communes of the Calvados department
