= Beuvillers, Calvados =

Beuvillers
- Commune
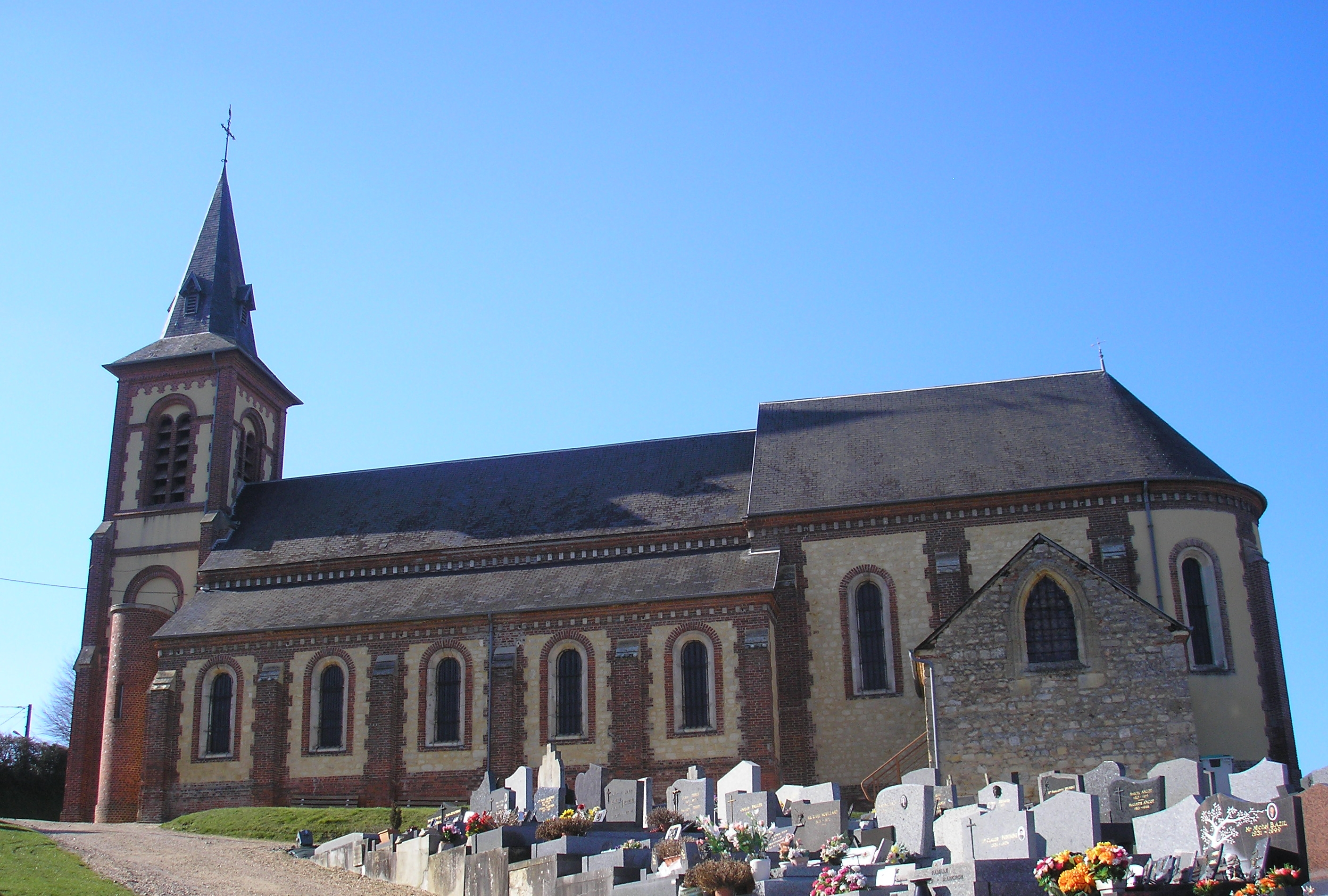
- The church in Beuvillers

- Coat of arms
- Location of Beuvillers
- Location within France Location within Normandy
- Coordinates: 49°07′50″N 0°14′56″E
- Country: France
- Region: Normandy
- Department: Calvados
- Arrondissement: Lisieux
- Canton: Lisieux
- Intercommunality: CA Lisieux Normandie

Government
  - Mayor (2020–2026): Didier Mauduit
- Area^{1}: 4.92 km^{2} (1.90 sq mi)
- Elevation: 51 m (167 ft)
- Highest elevation: 140 m (460 ft)
- Lowest elevation: 47 m (154 ft)
- Population (2023): 1,283
  - Density: 261/km^{2} (675/sq mi)
- Time zone: UTC+01:00 (CET)
  - Summer (DST): UTC+02:00 (CEST)
- INSEE/Postal code: 14069 /14100
- ^{1} French Land Register data, which excludes lakes, ponds, glaciers > 1 km^{2} (0.386 sq mi or 247 acres) and river estuaries.

Beuvillers is a commune in the Calvados department in the Normandy region in northwestern France.

== Population ==
Historical population
Year	Pop.	±% p.a.
1968	1,267	—
1975	1,263	−0.05%
1982	1,037	−2.78%
1990	1,054	+0.20%
1999	1,069	+0.16%
2007	1,216	+1.62%
2012	1,358	+2.23%
2017	1,351	−0.10%
2023	1,283	−0.86%
Source: INSEE

== International relations ==
Beuvillers is twinned with Gipperath (Germany).

== See also ==
- Communes of the Calvados department
