= Canton of Lisieux =

Coordinates: 49.15°N 0.23°E

- Canton
- Situation of the canton of Lisieux in the department of Calvados
- Country: France
- Region: Normandy
- Department: Calvados
- No. of communes: {{{nbcomm}}}
- Population (2023): 25,705
- INSEE code: 1417

The canton of Lisieux is an administrative division of the Calvados department, northwestern France. It was created at the French canton reorganisation which came into effect in March 2015. Its seat is in Lisieux.

It consists of the following communes:

1. Beuvillers
2. Cordebugle
3. Courtonne-la-Meurdrac
4. Courtonne-les-Deux-Églises
5. Glos
6. L'Hôtellerie
7. Lisieux
8. Marolles
9. Le Mesnil-Guillaume
10. Saint-Martin-de-la-Lieue
