= Glos =

- Commune
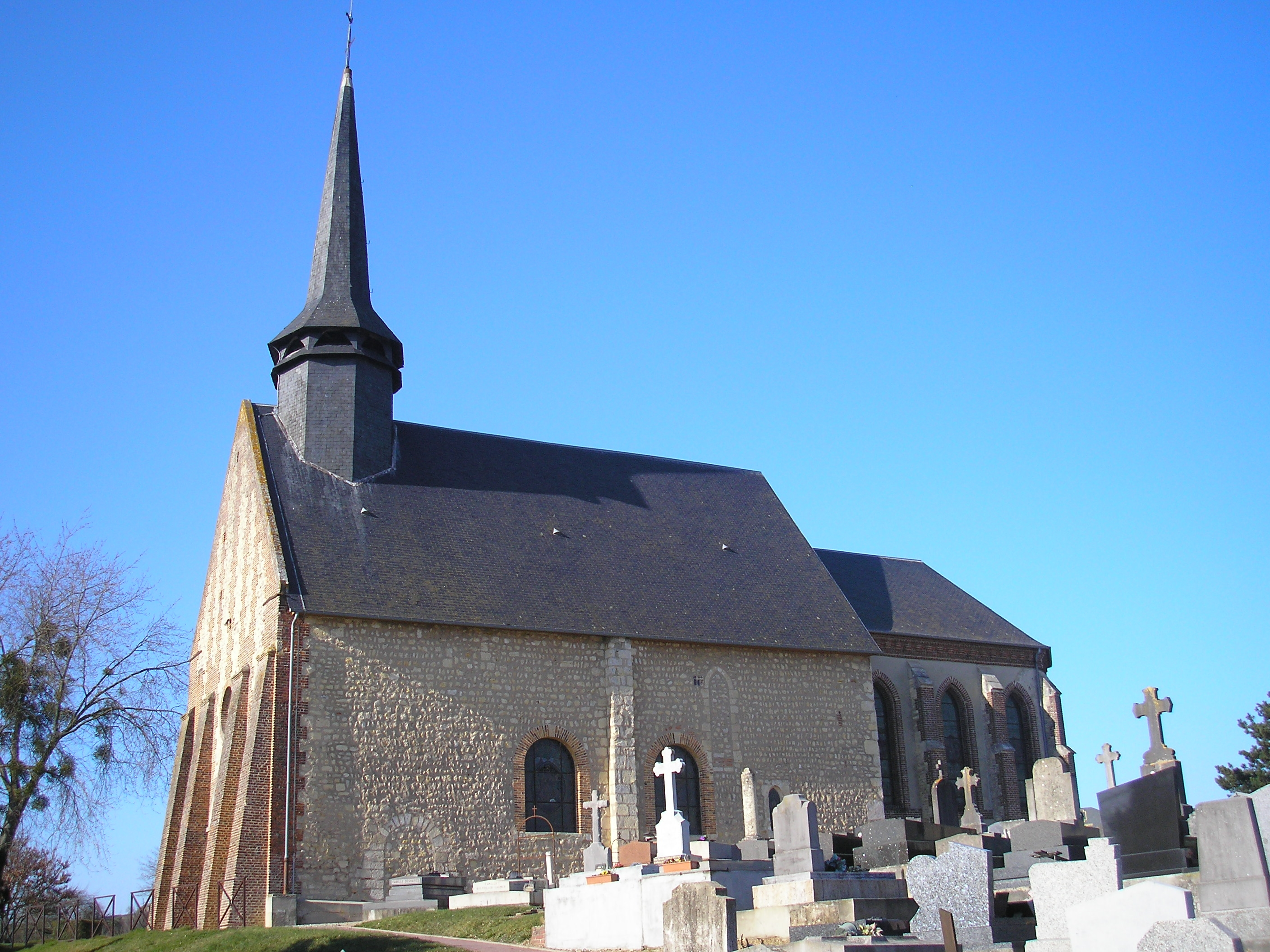
- The church in Glos
- Location of Glos
- Location within France Location within Normandy
- Coordinates: 49°07′24″N 0°16′54″E
- Country: France
- Region: Normandy
- Department: Calvados
- Arrondissement: Lisieux
- Canton: Lisieux
- Intercommunality: CA Lisieux Normandie

Government
  - Mayor (2020–2026): Bernard Broisin-Doutaz
- Area^{1}: 12.93 km^{2} (4.99 sq mi)
- Elevation: 64 m (210 ft)
- Highest elevation: 165 m (541 ft)
- Lowest elevation: 49 m (161 ft)
- Population (2023): 931
  - Density: 72.0/km^{2} (186/sq mi)
- Time zone: UTC+01:00 (CET)
  - Summer (DST): UTC+02:00 (CEST)
- INSEE/Postal code: 14303 /14100
- ^{1} French Land Register data, which excludes lakes, ponds, glaciers > 1 km^{2} (0.386 sq mi or 247 acres) and river estuaries.

Glos (French pronunciation: [ɡlo]) is a commune in the Calvados department in the Normandy region in northwestern France.

== Population ==
Historical population
Year	Pop.	±% p.a.
1968	780	—
1975	767	−0.24%
1982	783	+0.30%
1990	857	+1.14%
1999	909	+0.66%
2007	897	−0.17%
2012	905	+0.18%
2017	924	+0.42%
2023	931	+0.13%
Source: INSEE

== See also ==
- Communes of the Calvados department
