= Saint-Martin-de-la-Lieue =

- Commune
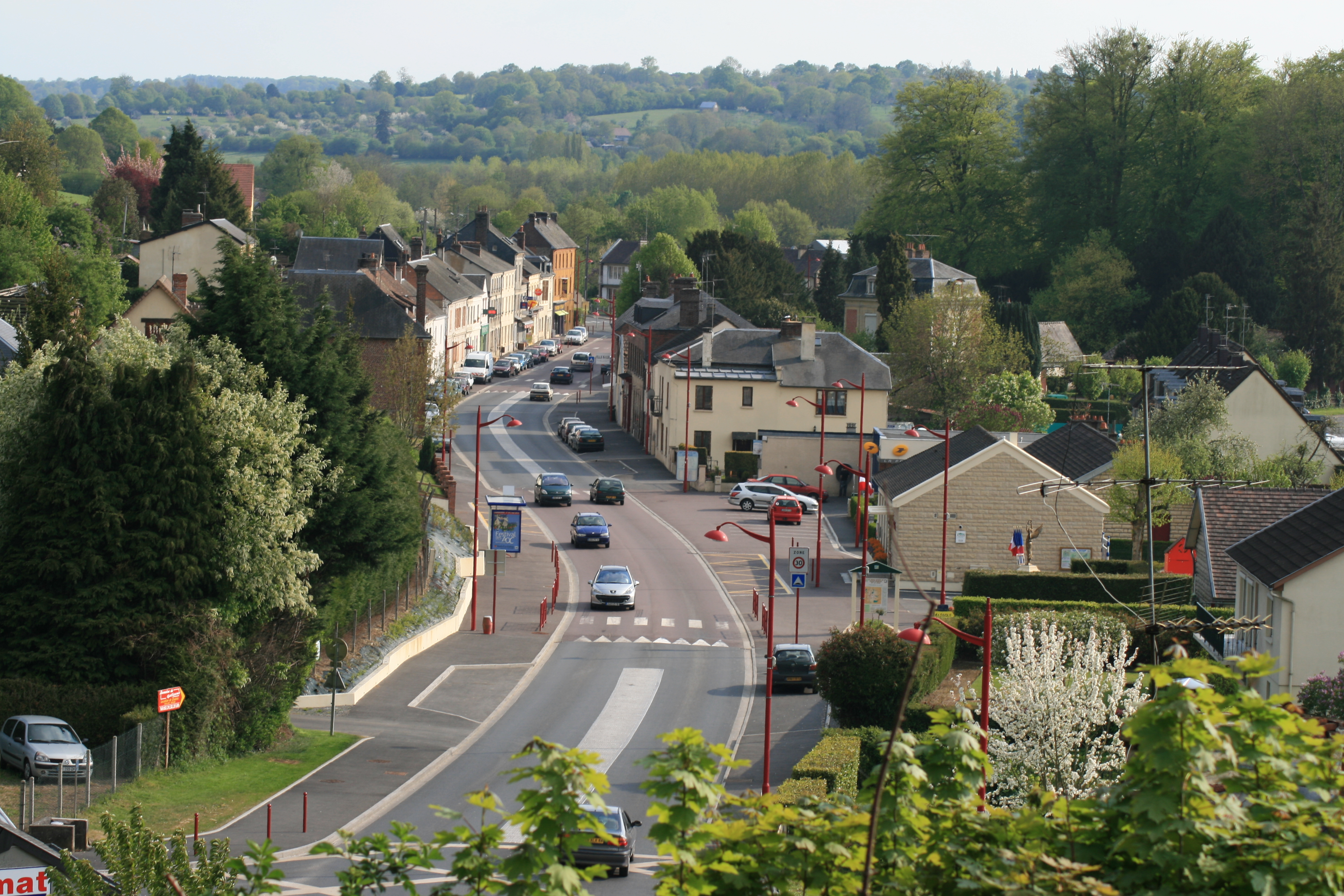
- The main road in Saint-Martin-de-la-Lieue

- Coat of arms
- Location of Saint-Martin-de-la-Lieue
- Location within France Location within Normandy
- Coordinates: 49°06′45″N 0°13′08″E
- Country: France
- Region: Normandy
- Department: Calvados
- Arrondissement: Lisieux
- Canton: Lisieux
- Intercommunality: CA Lisieux Normandie

Government
  - Mayor (2020–2026): Hubert Lenain
- Area^{1}: 8.40 km^{2} (3.24 sq mi)
- Elevation: 62 m (203 ft)
- Highest elevation: 166 m (545 ft)
- Lowest elevation: 46 m (151 ft)
- Population (2023): 763
  - Density: 90.8/km^{2} (235/sq mi)
- Time zone: UTC+01:00 (CET)
  - Summer (DST): UTC+02:00 (CEST)
- INSEE/Postal code: 14625 /14100
- ^{1} French Land Register data, which excludes lakes, ponds, glaciers > 1 km^{2} (0.386 sq mi or 247 acres) and river estuaries.

Saint-Martin-de-la-Lieue (French pronunciation: [sɛ̃ maʁtɛ̃ də la ljø]) is a commune in the Calvados department in the Normandy region in northwestern France.

== Population ==
Historical population
Year	Pop.	±% p.a.
1968	597	—
1975	607	+0.24%
1982	906	+5.89%
1990	951	+0.61%
1999	878	−0.88%
2007	850	−0.40%
2012	801	−1.18%
2017	782	−0.48%
2023	763	−0.41%
Source: INSEE

== See also ==
- Communes of the Calvados department
