= Le Mesnil-Guillaume =

- Commune
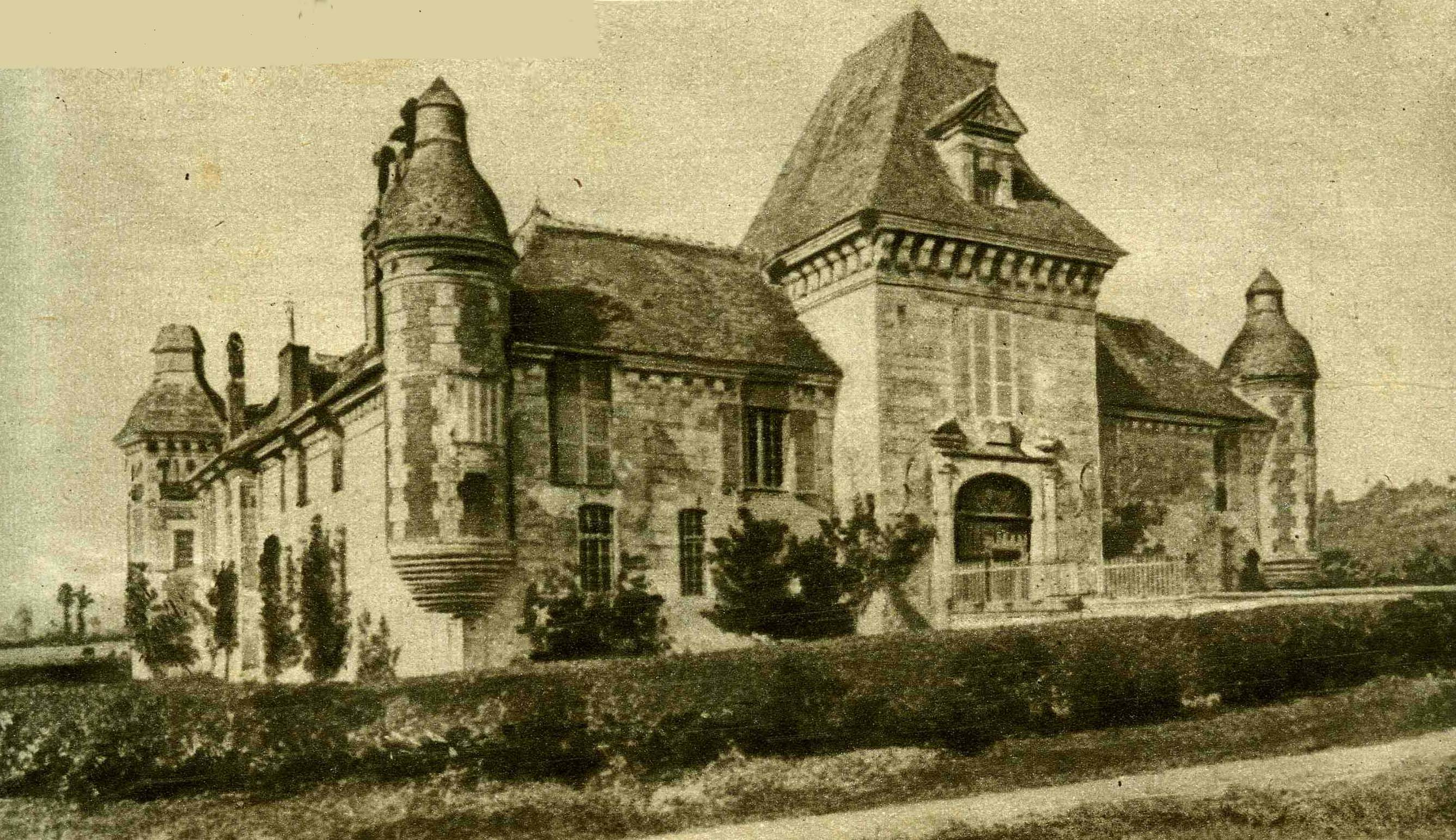
- Castle, in 1918
- Location of Le Mesnil-Guillaume
- Location within France Location within Normandy
- Coordinates: 49°06′19″N 0°17′19″E
- Country: France
- Region: Normandy
- Department: Calvados
- Arrondissement: Lisieux
- Canton: Lisieux
- Intercommunality: CA Lisieux Normandie

Government
  - Mayor (2020–2026): Alain Mignot
- Area^{1}: 3.85 km^{2} (1.49 sq mi)
- Elevation: 60 m (200 ft)
- Highest elevation: 171 m (561 ft)
- Lowest elevation: 57 m (187 ft)
- Population (2023): 551
  - Density: 143/km^{2} (371/sq mi)
- Time zone: UTC+01:00 (CET)
  - Summer (DST): UTC+02:00 (CEST)
- INSEE/Postal code: 14421 /14100
- ^{1} French Land Register data, which excludes lakes, ponds, glaciers > 1 km^{2} (0.386 sq mi or 247 acres) and river estuaries.

Le Mesnil-Guillaume (French pronunciation: [lə mɛnil ɡijom]) is a commune in the Calvados department in the Normandy region of northwestern France.

== Population ==
Historical population
Year	Pop.	±% p.a.
1968	297	—
1975	384	+3.74%
1982	470	+2.93%
1990	513	+1.10%
1999	496	−0.37%
2007	528	+0.78%
2012	615	+3.10%
2017	605	−0.33%
2023	551	−1.55%
Source: INSEE

== See also ==
- Communes of the Calvados department
