= Cordebugle =

- Commune
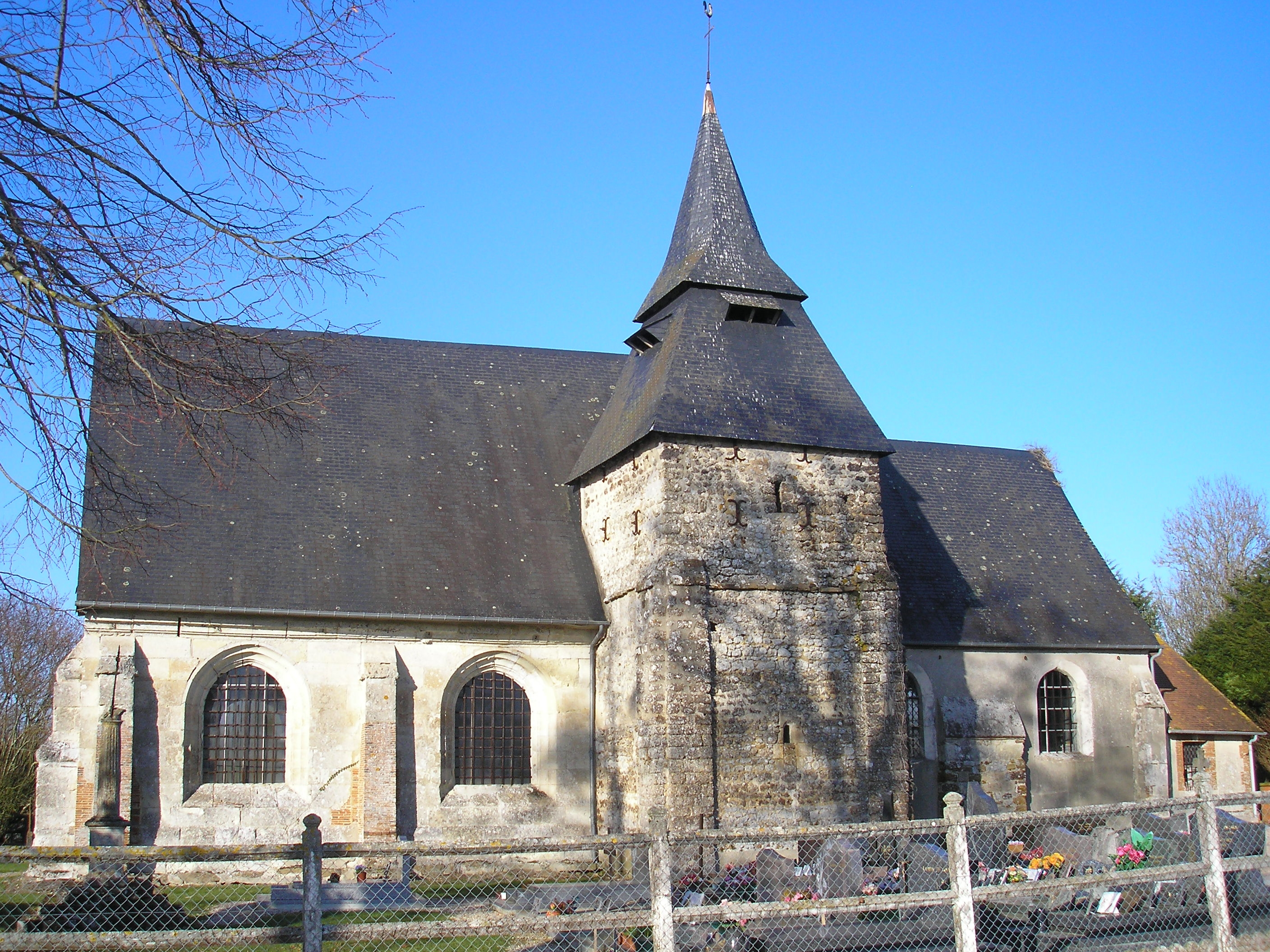
- The church in Cordebugle
- Location of Cordebugle
- Location within France Location within Normandy
- Coordinates: 49°06′42″N 0°22′50″E
- Country: France
- Region: Normandy
- Department: Calvados
- Arrondissement: Lisieux
- Canton: Lisieux
- Intercommunality: CA Lisieux Normandie

Government
  - Mayor (2020–2026): Alain Dutot
- Area^{1}: 8.97 km^{2} (3.46 sq mi)
- Elevation: 156 m (512 ft)
- Highest elevation: 194 m (636 ft)
- Lowest elevation: 86 m (282 ft)
- Population (2023): 160
  - Density: 18/km^{2} (46/sq mi)
- Time zone: UTC+01:00 (CET)
  - Summer (DST): UTC+02:00 (CEST)
- INSEE/Postal code: 14179 /14100
- ^{1} French Land Register data, which excludes lakes, ponds, glaciers > 1 km^{2} (0.386 sq mi or 247 acres) and river estuaries.

Cordebugle (French pronunciation: [kɔʁdəbyɡlə]) is a commune in the Calvados department in the Normandy region in northwestern France.

== Population ==
Historical population
Year	Pop.	±% p.a.
1968	72	—
1975	72	+0.00%
1982	101	+4.95%
1990	110	+1.07%
1999	91	−2.08%
2007	121	+3.63%
2012	142	+3.25%
2017	157	+2.03%
2023	160	+0.32%
Source: INSEE

== See also ==
- Communes of the Calvados department
