= Marolles, Calvados =

Marolles
- Commune
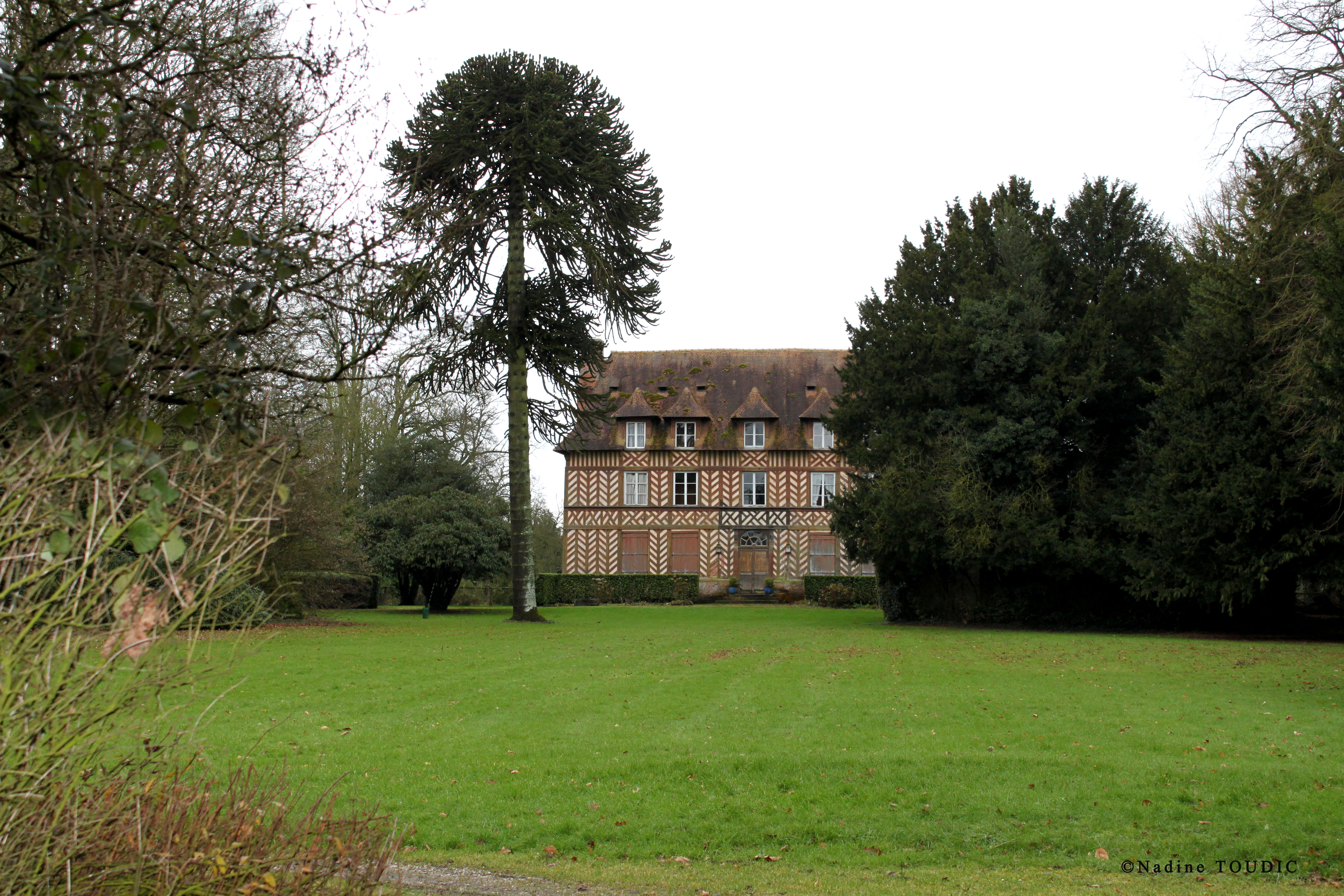
- Mont-Hérault Manor
- Location of Marolles
- Location within France Location within Normandy
- Coordinates: 49°08′20″N 0°22′23″E
- Country: France
- Region: Normandy
- Department: Calvados
- Arrondissement: Lisieux
- Canton: Lisieux
- Intercommunality: CA Lisieux Normandie

Government
  - Mayor (2020–2026): Roland Edeline
- Area^{1}: 12.22 km^{2} (4.72 sq mi)
- Elevation: 166 m (545 ft)
- Highest elevation: 184 m (604 ft)
- Lowest elevation: 79 m (259 ft)
- Population (2023): 749
  - Density: 61.3/km^{2} (159/sq mi)
- Time zone: UTC+01:00 (CET)
  - Summer (DST): UTC+02:00 (CEST)
- INSEE/Postal code: 14403 /14100
- ^{1} French Land Register data, which excludes lakes, ponds, glaciers > 1 km^{2} (0.386 sq mi or 247 acres) and river estuaries.

Marolles (French pronunciation: [maʁɔl]) is a commune in the Calvados department in the Normandy region in northwestern France.

== Population ==
Historical population
Year	Pop.	±% p.a.
1968	412	—
1975	394	−0.64%
1982	493	+3.25%
1990	565	+1.72%
1999	625	+1.13%
2007	653	+0.55%
2012	744	+2.64%
2017	768	+0.64%
2023	749	−0.42%
Source: INSEE

== See also ==
- Communes of the Calvados department
