= Courtonne-les-Deux-Églises =

- Commune
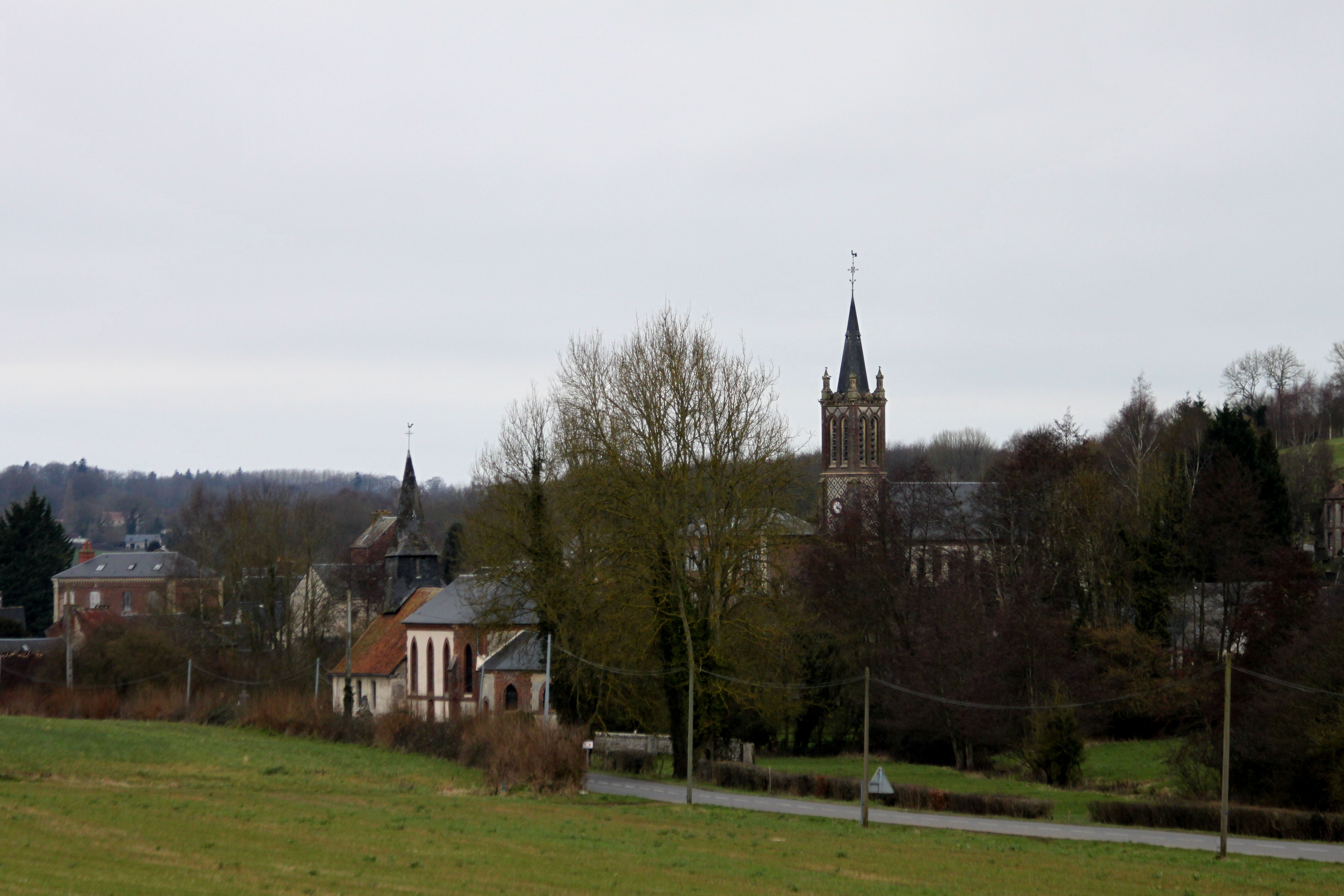
- A general view of Courtonne-les-Deux-Églises
- Location of Courtonne-les-Deux-Églises
- Location within France Location within Normandy
- Coordinates: 49°05′09″N 0°22′17″E
- Country: France
- Region: Normandy
- Department: Calvados
- Arrondissement: Lisieux
- Canton: Lisieux
- Intercommunality: CA Lisieux Normandie

Government
  - Mayor (2020–2026): Déborah Dutot
- Area^{1}: 13.68 km^{2} (5.28 sq mi)
- Elevation: 110 m (360 ft)
- Highest elevation: 201 m (659 ft)
- Lowest elevation: 90 m (300 ft)
- Population (2023): 627
  - Density: 45.8/km^{2} (119/sq mi)
- Time zone: UTC+01:00 (CET)
  - Summer (DST): UTC+02:00 (CEST)
- INSEE/Postal code: 14194 /14290
- ^{1} French Land Register data, which excludes lakes, ponds, glaciers > 1 km^{2} (0.386 sq mi or 247 acres) and river estuaries.

Courtonne-les-Deux-Églises (French pronunciation: [kuʁtɔn le dø.z‿eɡliz], literally Courtonne the Two Churches) is a commune in the Calvados department in the Normandy region in northwestern France.

== Population ==
Historical population
Year	Pop.	±% p.a.
1968	538	—
1975	487	−1.41%
1982	440	−1.44%
1990	471	+0.85%
1999	541	+1.55%
2007	588	+1.05%
2012	671	+2.68%
2017	658	−0.39%
2023	627	−0.80%
Source: INSEE

== See also ==
- Courtonne-la-Meurdrac
- Communes of the Calvados department
