= La Vespière-Friardel =

- Commune
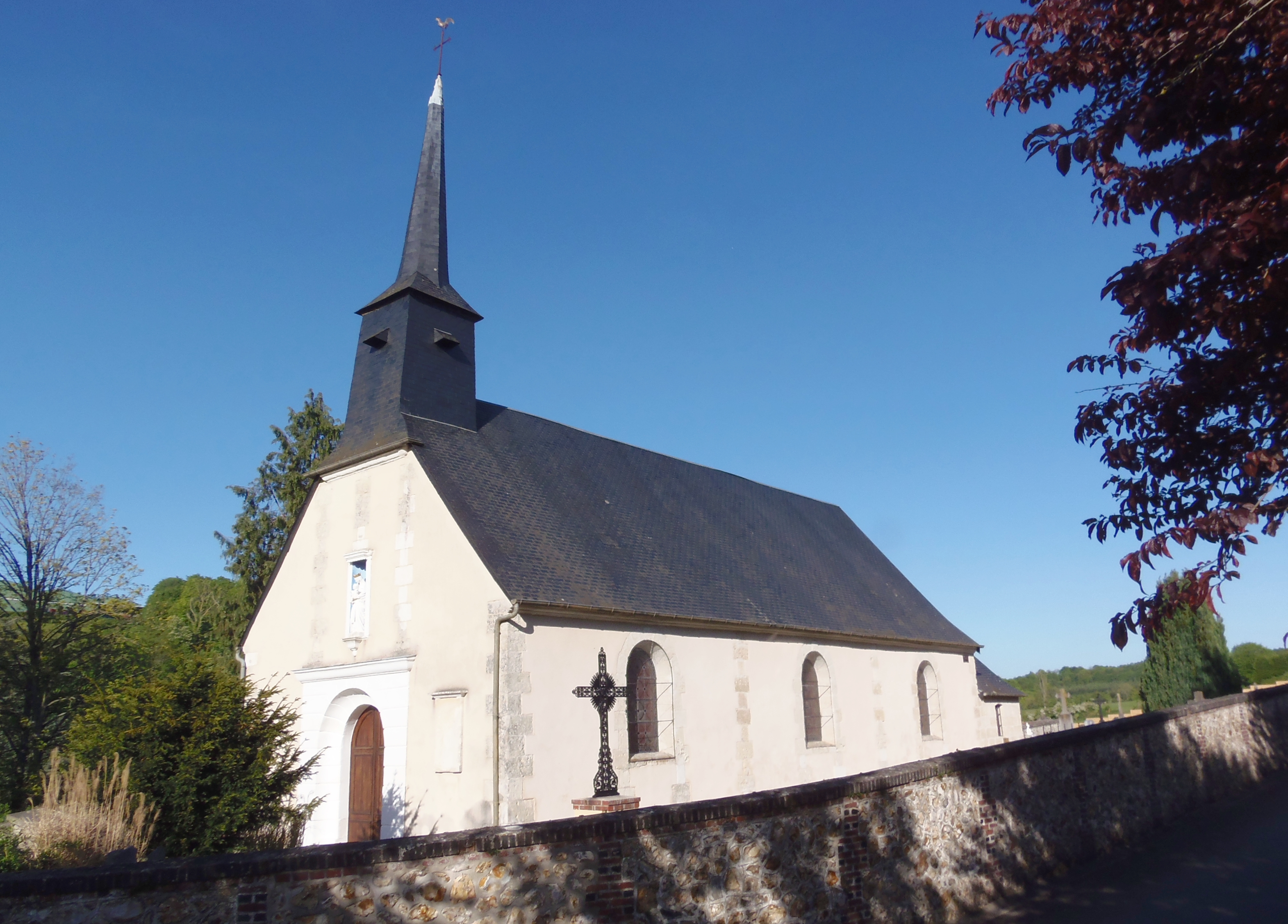
- The church in La Vespière
- Location of La Vespière-Friardel
- Location within France Location within Normandy
- Coordinates: 49°00′08″N 0°24′33″E
- Country: France
- Region: Normandy
- Department: Calvados
- Arrondissement: Lisieux
- Canton: Livarot-Pays-d'Auge
- Intercommunality: CA Lisieux Normandie

Government
  - Mayor (2020–2026): Sylvain Ballot
- Area^{1}: 18.04 km^{2} (6.97 sq mi)
- Population (2023): 1,179
  - Density: 65.35/km^{2} (169.3/sq mi)
- Time zone: UTC+01:00 (CET)
  - Summer (DST): UTC+02:00 (CEST)
- INSEE/Postal code: 14740 /14290
- ^{1} French Land Register data, which excludes lakes, ponds, glaciers > 1 km^{2} (0.386 sq mi or 247 acres) and river estuaries.

La Vespière-Friardel (French pronunciation: [la vɛpjɛʁ fʁijaʁdɛl]) is a commune in the department of Calvados, northwestern France. The municipality was established on 1 January 2016 by merger of the former communes of La Vespière and Friardel.

== See also ==
- Communes of the Calvados department
