= Friardel =

Commune in Calvados, France

- Part of La Vespière-Friardel
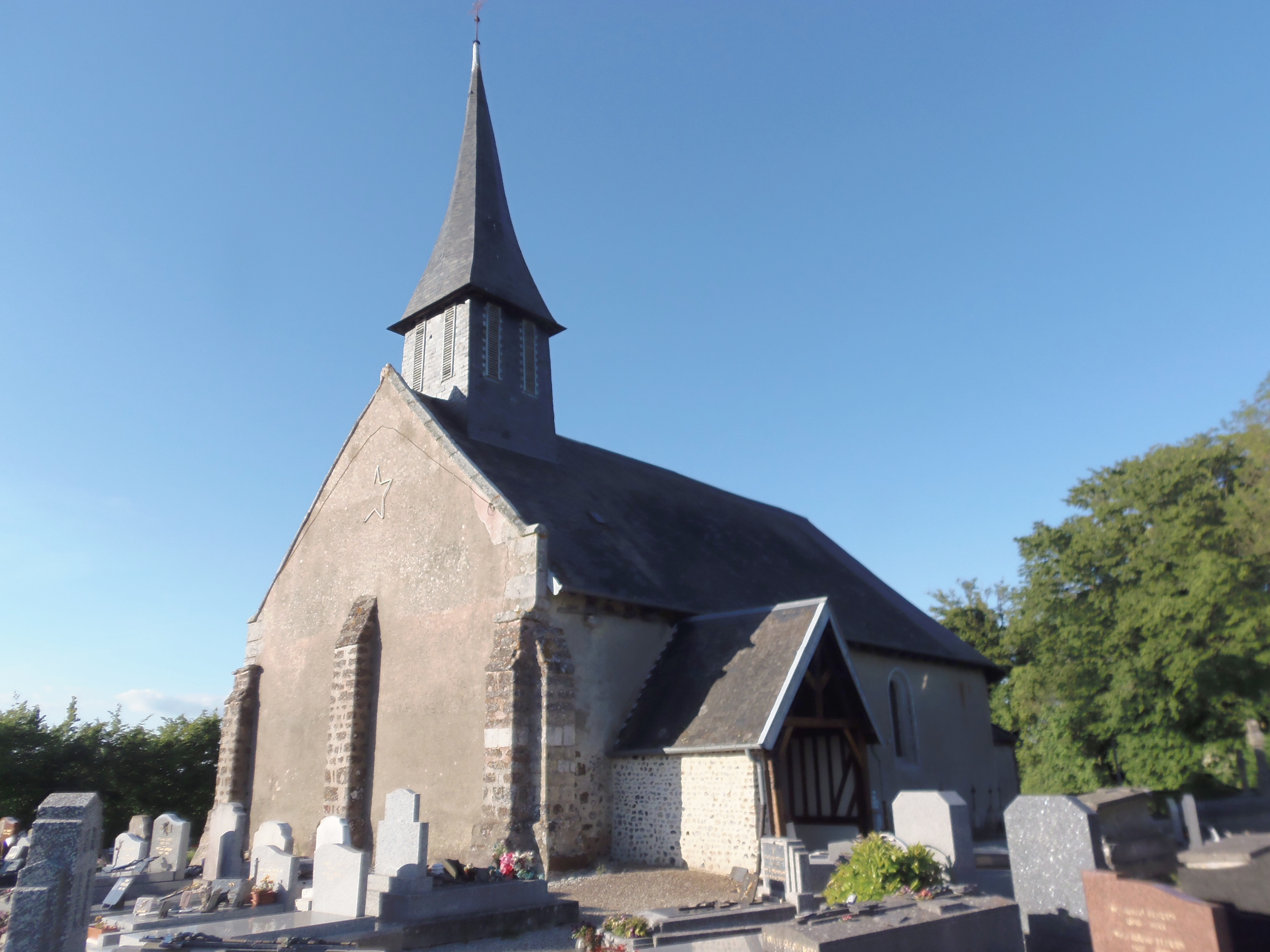
- Location of Friardel
- Location within France Location within Normandy
- Coordinates: 49°00′04″N 0°23′22″E
- Country: France
- Region: Normandy
- Department: Calvados
- Arrondissement: Lisieux
- Canton: Livarot-Pays-d'Auge
- Commune: La Vespière-Friardel
- Area^{1}: 9.39 km^{2} (3.63 sq mi)
- Elevation: 95 m (312 ft)
- Highest elevation: 204 m (669 ft)
- Lowest elevation: 115 m (377 ft)
- Population (2019): 248
  - Density: 26.4/km^{2} (68.4/sq mi)
- Time zone: UTC+01:00 (CET)
  - Summer (DST): UTC+02:00 (CEST)
- Postal code: 14290
- ^{1} French Land Register data, which excludes lakes, ponds, glaciers > 1 km^{2} (0.386 sq mi or 247 acres) and river estuaries.

Friardel (French pronunciation: [fʁijaʁdɛl]) is a former commune in the Calvados department in the Normandy region in northwestern France. On 1 January 2016, it was merged into the new commune of La Vespière-Friardel.

== See also ==
- Communes of the Calvados department
