= La Vespière =

Commune in Calvados, France

- Part of La Vespière-Friardel
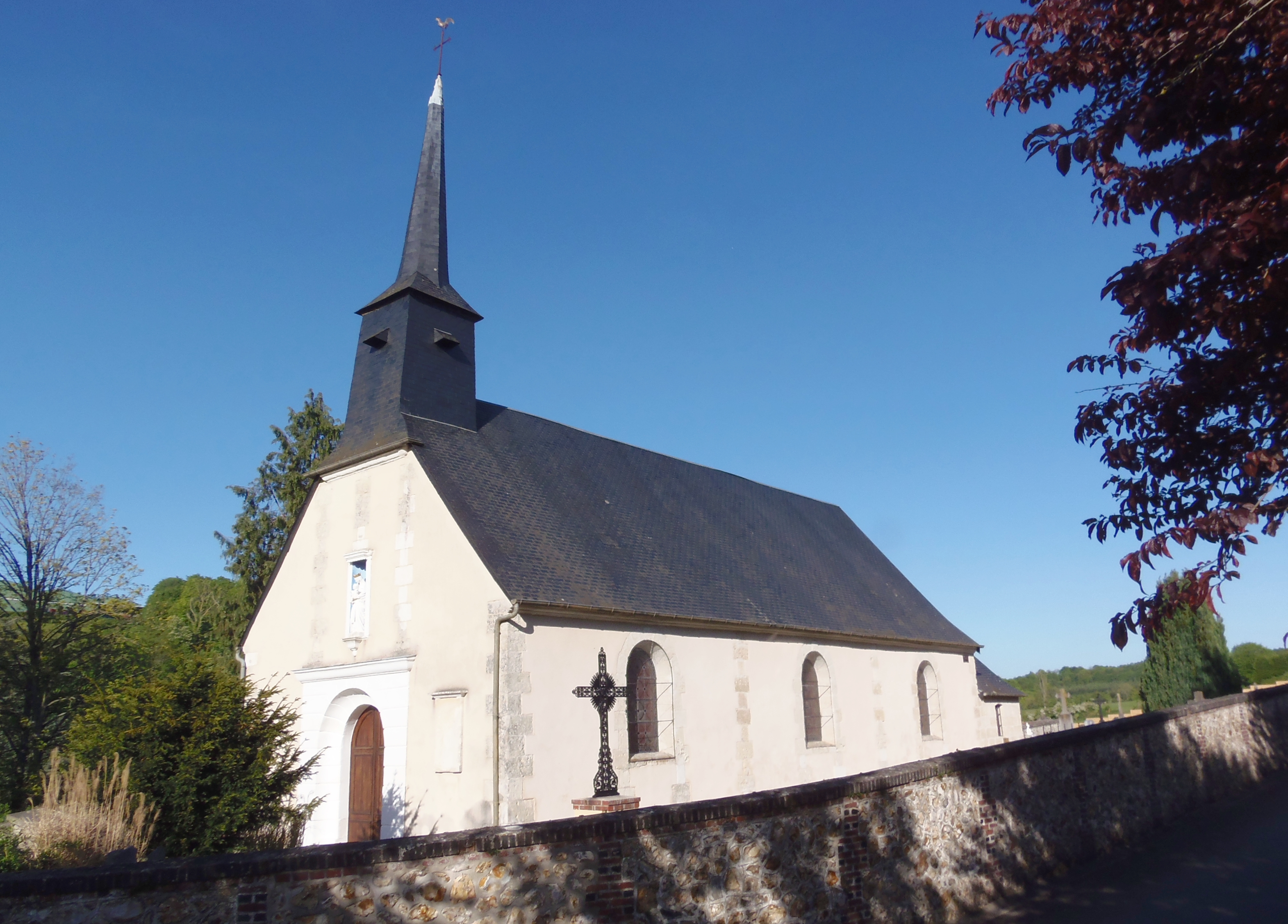

- Coat of arms
- Location of La Vespière
- Location within France Location within Normandy
- Coordinates: 49°01′10″N 0°24′47″E
- Country: France
- Region: Normandy
- Department: Calvados
- Arrondissement: Lisieux
- Canton: Livarot-Pays-d'Auge
- Commune: La Vespière-Friardel
- Area^{1}: 8.65 km^{2} (3.34 sq mi)
- Elevation: 135 m (443 ft)
- Highest elevation: 190 m (620 ft)
- Lowest elevation: 118 m (387 ft)
- Population (2019): 933
  - Density: 108/km^{2} (279/sq mi)
- Demonym: Vesperois
- Time zone: UTC+01:00 (CET)
  - Summer (DST): UTC+02:00 (CEST)
- Postal code: 14290
- ^{1} French Land Register data, which excludes lakes, ponds, glaciers > 1 km^{2} (0.386 sq mi or 247 acres) and river estuaries.

La Vespière (French pronunciation: [la vɛpjɛʁ]) is a former commune in the Calvados department in the Normandy region in northwestern France. On 1 January 2016, it was merged into the new commune of La Vespière-Friardel.

== Population ==
Historical population
Year	Pop.	±% p.a.
1962	386	—
1968	402	+0.68%
1975	415	+0.46%
1982	731	+8.42%
1990	883	+2.39%
1999	972	+1.07%
2006	939	−0.49%
2019	933	−0.05%
Source: EHESS and INSEE

== See also ==
- Communes of the Calvados department
