= Audrieu =

- Commune
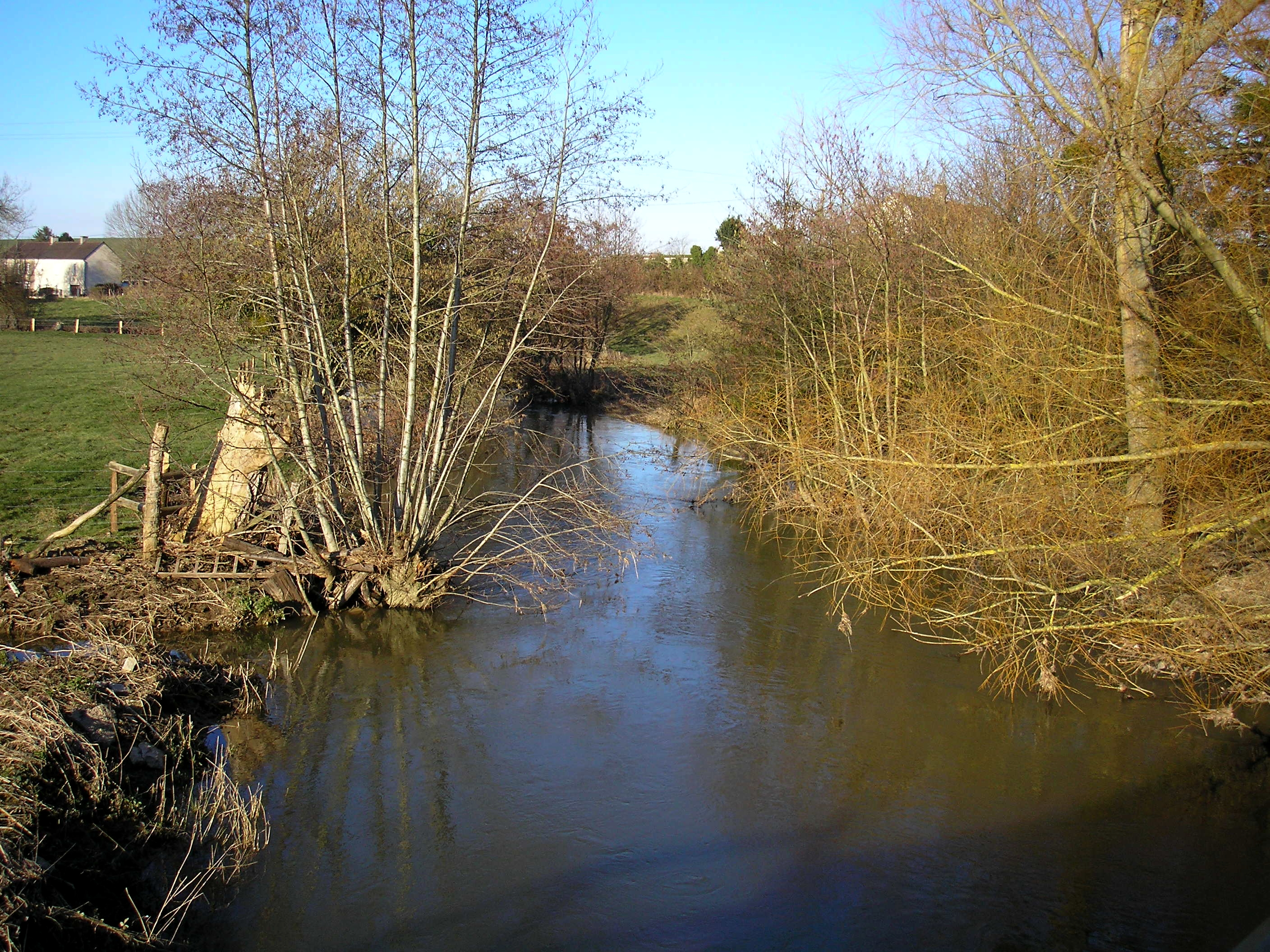
- The Seulles river near Pont Roch
- Location of Audrieu
- Location within France Location within Normandy
- Coordinates: 49°12′36″N 0°35′32″W
- Country: France
- Region: Normandy
- Department: Calvados
- Arrondissement: Bayeux
- Canton: Thue et Mue
- Intercommunality: CC Seulles Terre Mer

Government
  - Mayor (2022–2026): Philippe Gautier
- Area^{1}: 11.31 km^{2} (4.37 sq mi)
- Elevation: 45 m (148 ft)
- Highest elevation: 105 m (344 ft)
- Lowest elevation: 37 m (121 ft)
- Population (2023): 1,167
  - Density: 103.2/km^{2} (267.2/sq mi)
- Time zone: UTC+01:00 (CET)
  - Summer (DST): UTC+02:00 (CEST)
- INSEE/Postal code: 14026 /14250
- ^{1} French Land Register data, which excludes lakes, ponds, glaciers > 1 km^{2} (0.386 sq mi or 247 acres) and river estuaries.

Audrieu (French pronunciation: [odʁijø]) is a commune in the Calvados department in the Normandy region of north-western France.

== Geography ==
Audrieu is located some 11 km south-east of Bayeux and 16 km west by north-west of Caen. Access to the commune is by the D 82 road from Ducy-Sainte-Marguerite in the north which passes south through the centre of the commune and the village and continues to Tilly-sur-Seulles in the south. The D 187 branches off the D 82 in the north of the commune and goes west to Chouain. The D 178 branches off the D82 south of the village and goes west to Juaye-Mondaye. The D158 branches off the D 82 in the north of the commune and goes north to Loucelles. The D 94 branches of the D 82 in the village and goes east to Brouay. The railway from Bayeux to Caen passes through the north of the commune with a station at Le Haut des Jardins. Apart from the village there are the hamlets of Lieu Moussard, Hervieu, Le Haut des Jardins, Le Bas d'Audrieu, Le Calvaire, Ferme de la Motte, Hameau Pavie, and Le Pont Roch. The commune is farmland with residential areas mostly along the D 82.

The Seulles river forms the western border of the commune as it flows north to join the ocean at Courseulles-sur-Mer.

== History ==
Audrieu village dates back to Classical Antiquity when it was called Alderium. There are traces of Gallo-Roman dwellings and a Motte-and-bailey castle. The first lord of the area was Percy, cook for William the Conqueror, who gave it to the descendants of the Duke of Northumberland. In 1593 Audrieu returned to Guillaume de Séran, who married Marguerite de Percy, and whose lordship became a barony in 1615.

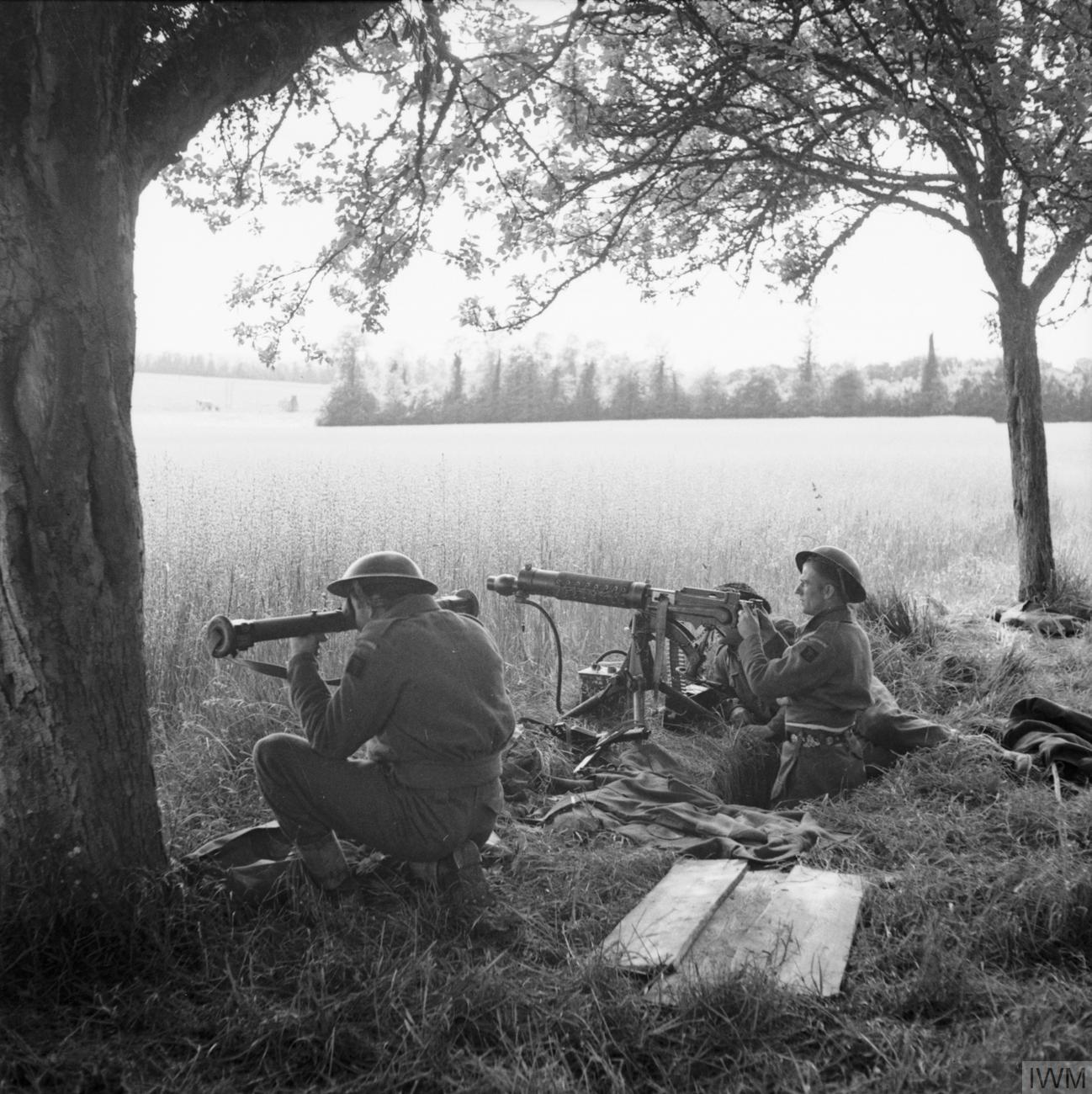
British soldiers in Audrieu on 13 June 1944

After being sold in the French Revolution the château returned to the Séran family at the Restoration and is still in the hands of their descendants. During the Second World War Gerhard Bremer, commandant of the 12th Reconnaissance Battalion of the German army established his headquarters in the château. On 8 June 1944, in clearings, forests, and orchards surrounding the castle, 24 members of the 3rd Canadian Infantry Division were executed: 22 from the Royal Winnipeg Rifles and two from the Queen's Own Rifles of Canada. Two British soldiers were killed at the same time. The castle now houses a luxury hotel and restaurant.

== Administration ==
List of Successive Mayors

| From | To | Name | Party | Position |
|---|---|---|---|---|
| 1912 | | Saillard du Boisberthe | | |
| 1916 | 1944 | Henri Naguet de Saint-Vulfran | | |
| 1945 | 1960 | Philippe Livry-Level | RPF | |
| 1961 | 1969 | Leseigneur | | |
| 1971 | | Jean Poi Leguern | | |
| 1995 | 2017 | Jean-Louis Lebouteiller | PS | Liberal Nurse |
| 2017 | 2020 | Régina Dutacq-Fouillaud | | |
| 2020 | 2026 | Frédéric Levallois | | |

== Demography ==
The inhabitants of the commune are known as Aldériens or Aldériennes in French.

Historical population

| Year | Pop. | ±% p.a. |
|---|---|---|
| 1793 | 529 | — |
| 1821 | 835 | +1.64% |
| 1846 | 741 | −0.48% |
| 1872 | 664 | −0.42% |
| 1901 | 631 | −0.18% |
| 1926 | 456 | −1.29% |
| 1946 | 536 | +0.81% |
| 1962 | 520 | −0.19% |
| 1968 | 539 | +0.60% |

| Year | Pop. | ±% p.a. |
|---|---|---|
| 1975 | 485 | −1.50% |
| 1982 | 676 | +4.86% |
| 1990 | 868 | +3.17% |
| 1999 | 839 | −0.38% |
| 2007 | 978 | +1.93% |
| 2012 | 1,039 | +1.22% |
| 2017 | 1,046 | +0.13% |
| 2023 | 1,167 | +1.84% |

Source: EHESS and INSEE

== Culture and heritage ==
=== Civil heritage ===
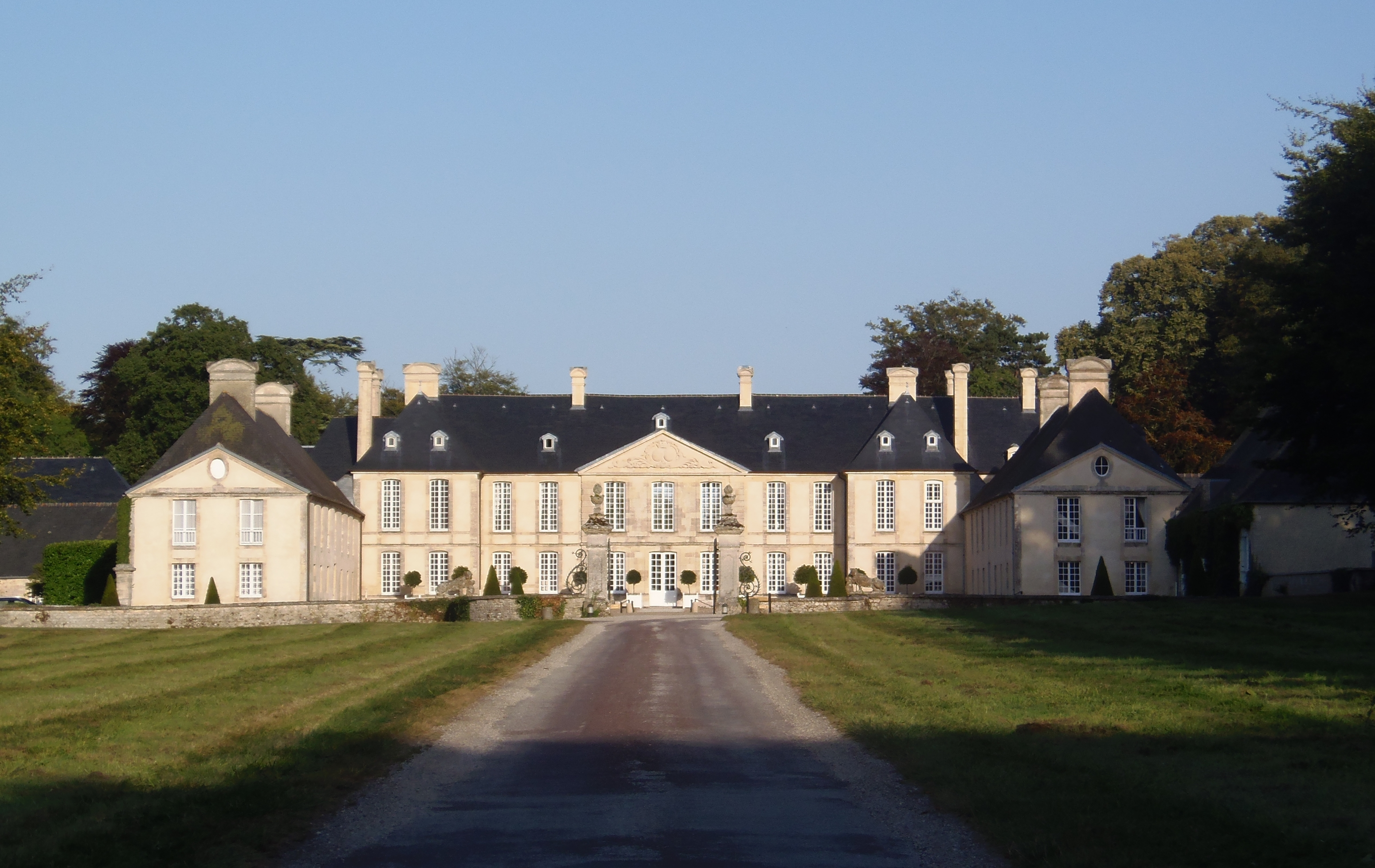
The Chateau

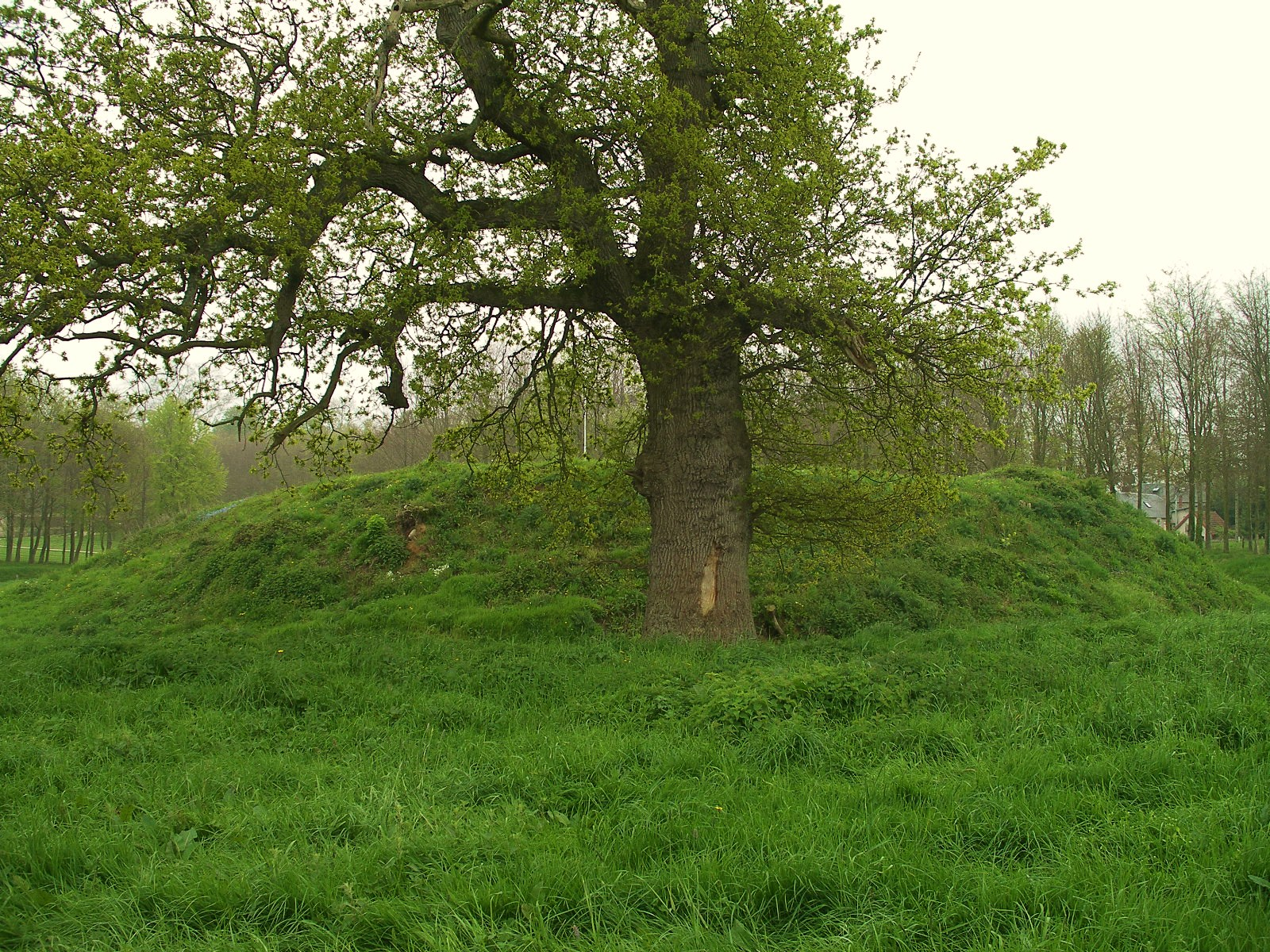
Remains of the Motte-and-bailey castle

The commune has two buildings and sites that are registered as historical monuments:

- The Chateau of Audrieu (18th century). The Chateau is composed of a main building with two projecting pavilions and a centre topped by a triangular pediment. The Chateau of La Motte is older with the Saint-Louis chapel dating from the 13th century.
- The Chateau grounds (18th century)

Other sites of interest are:

- The Tailleboscq Mill on the Seulles river which was converted to a Dairy in 1926.
- The Audrieu Railway Station or Le Haut des Jardins Station is far to the north of the village and is served by the Mantes-la-Jolie to Cherbourg line.
- The remains of the Motte-and-bailey castle

=== Religious heritage ===
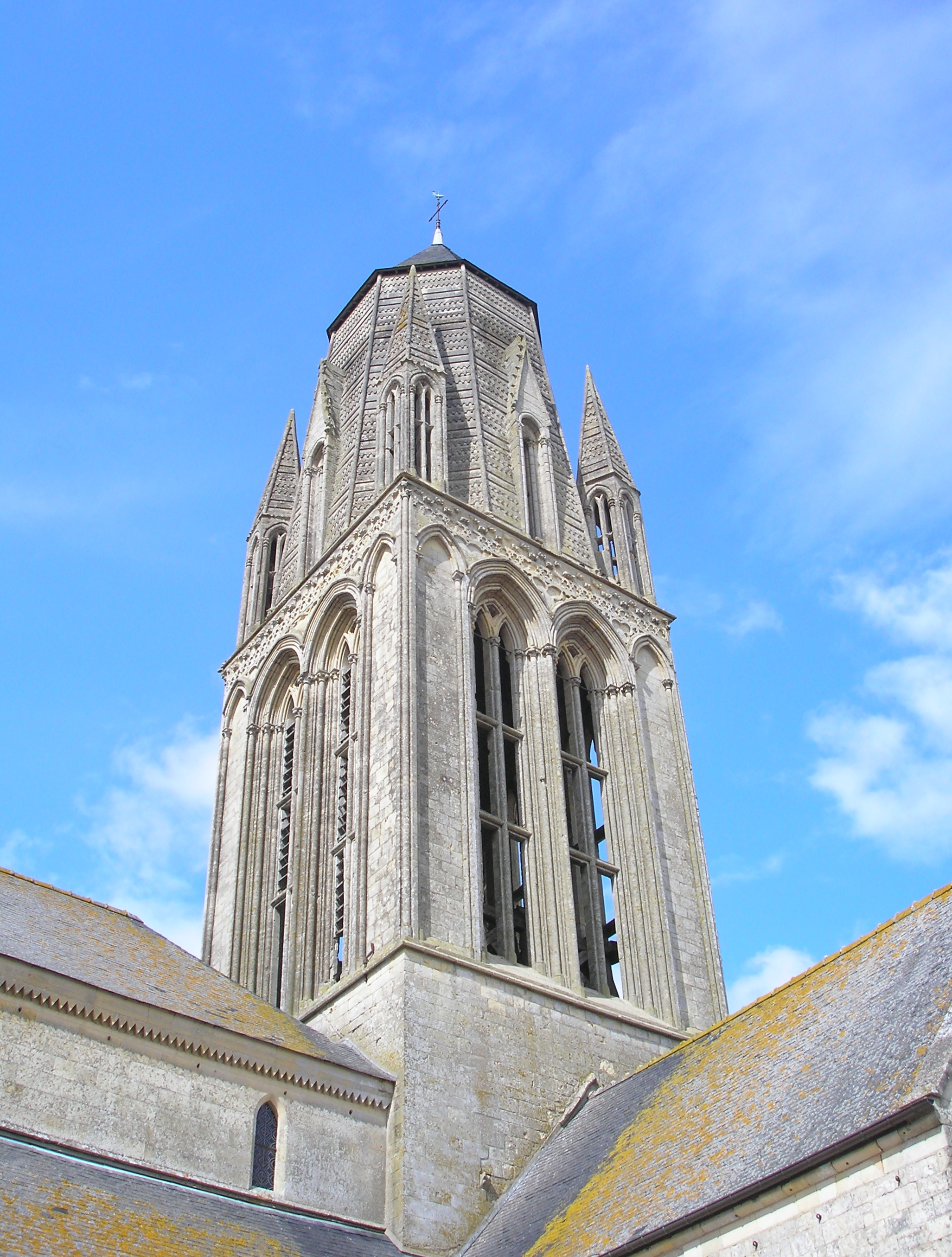
The bell tower of the church

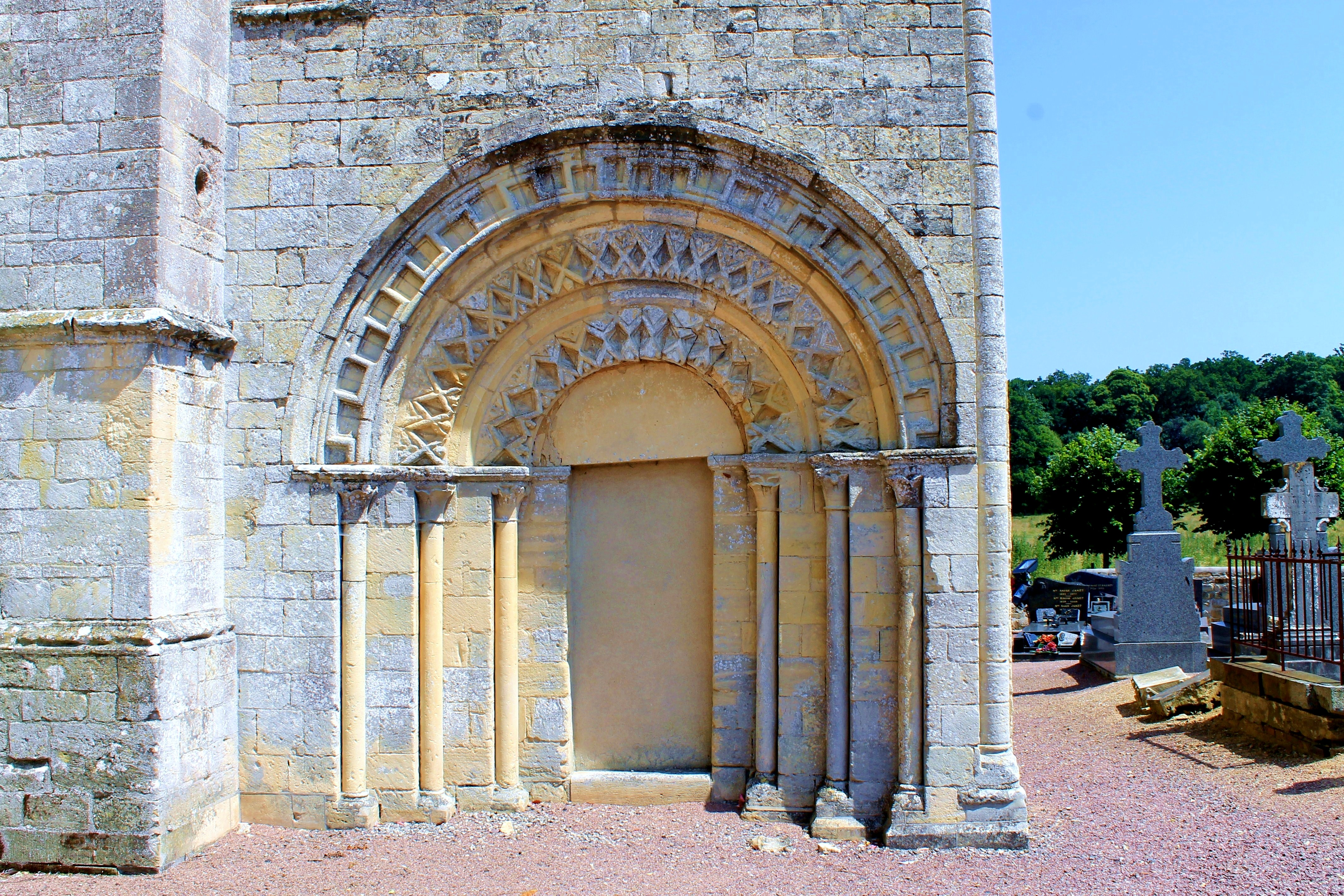
The entrance to the church

The commune has one religious building that is registered as a historical monument:

- The Church of Notre-Dame d'Audrieu (12th century). The Church was founded by Trinity Abbey, Vendôme, who owned a nearby priory-priest. The church depended additionally on the Baron of Audrieu (possibly by retrocession of the priory of Saint-Nicolas-de-la-Chesnaye to whom this right belonged in the 14th century).

The Church contains three items that are registered as historical objects:

- A Painting: The Rosary (17th century)
- A Statue: Saint John the Baptist (14th century)
- A Statue: Virgin and Child (16th century)

== Notable people linked to the commune ==
- Jacques Berthault, called Bertaux (1733–1799), General in the Army of the Republic, born in Audrieu.
- Philippe Livry-Level, Grand-croix of the Legion of Honour, Companion of the Order of Liberation, Mayor of Audrieu (1945–1960).
- Monique Livry-Level, daughter of Philippe Livry-Level, resistance fighter, Commandeur of the Legion of Honour, Médaille militaire, Croix de guerre 1939–1945, and the King's Medal for Courage in the Cause of Freedom.

== See also ==
- Communes of the Calvados department
