= Colombiers-sur-Seulles =

- Commune
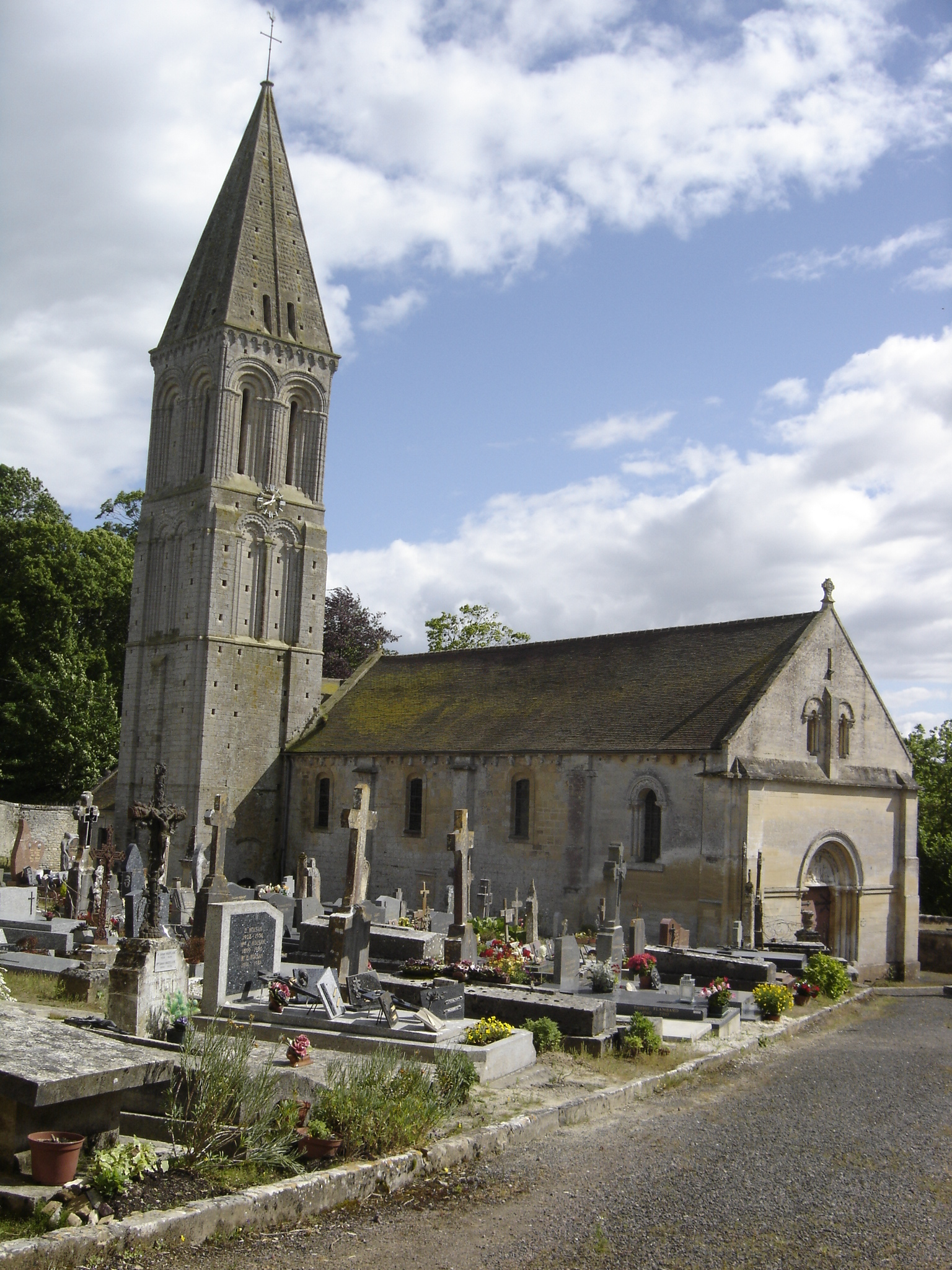
- The church in Colombiers-sur-Seulles

- Coat of arms
- Location of Colombiers-sur-Seulles
- Location within France Location within Normandy
- Coordinates: 49°17′38″N 0°30′37″W
- Country: France
- Region: Normandy
- Department: Calvados
- Arrondissement: Bayeux
- Canton: Thue et Mue
- Intercommunality: CC Seulles Terre Mer

Government
  - Mayor (2020–2026): Hervé Richard
- Area^{1}: 3.29 km^{2} (1.27 sq mi)
- Elevation: 40 m (130 ft)
- Highest elevation: 56 m (184 ft)
- Lowest elevation: 2 m (6.6 ft)
- Population (2023): 152
  - Density: 46.2/km^{2} (120/sq mi)
- Time zone: UTC+01:00 (CET)
  - Summer (DST): UTC+02:00 (CEST)
- INSEE/Postal code: 14169 /14480
- ^{1} French Land Register data, which excludes lakes, ponds, glaciers > 1 km^{2} (0.386 sq mi or 247 acres) and river estuaries.

Colombiers-sur-Seulles (French pronunciation: [kɔlɔ̃bje syʁ sœl], literally Colombiers on Seulles) is a commune in the Calvados department in the Normandy region in northwestern France.

== Population ==
Historical population
| Year | Pop. | ±% p.a. |
|---|---|---|
| 1968 | 164 | — |
| 1975 | 166 | +0.17% |
| 1982 | 158 | −0.70% |
| 1990 | 160 | +0.16% |
| 1999 | 181 | +1.38% |
| 2007 | 162 | −1.38% |
| 2012 | 176 | +1.67% |
| 2017 | 164 | −1.40% |
| 2023 | 152 | −1.26% |
Source: INSEE

== See also ==
- Communes of the Calvados department
