= Hottot-les-Bagues =

- Commune
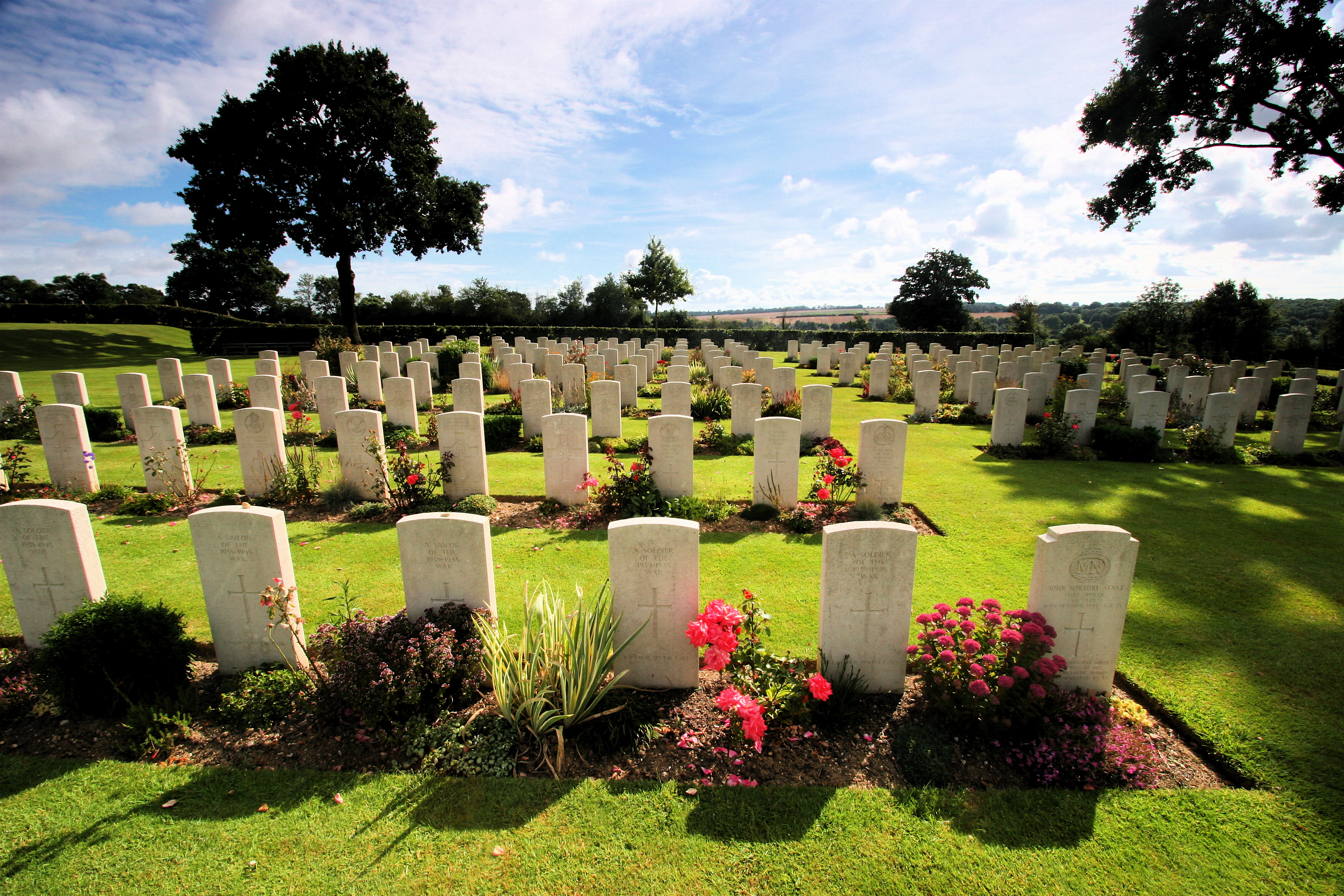
- Military cemetery
- Location of Hottot-les-Bagues
- Location within France Location within Normandy
- Coordinates: 49°09′12″N 0°38′52″W
- Country: France
- Region: Normandy
- Department: Calvados
- Arrondissement: Bayeux
- Canton: Les Monts d'Aunay
- Intercommunality: CC Seulles Terre Mer

Government
  - Mayor (2020–2026): Colette Orieult
- Area^{1}: 8.39 km^{2} (3.24 sq mi)
- Elevation: 222 m (728 ft)
- Highest elevation: 138 m (453 ft)
- Lowest elevation: 57 m (187 ft)
- Population (2023): 452
  - Density: 53.9/km^{2} (140/sq mi)
- Time zone: UTC+01:00 (CET)
  - Summer (DST): UTC+02:00 (CEST)
- INSEE/Postal code: 14336 /14250
- ^{1} French Land Register data, which excludes lakes, ponds, glaciers > 1 km^{2} (0.386 sq mi or 247 acres) and river estuaries.

Hottot-les-Bagues (French pronunciation: [ɔto le baɡ]) is a commune in the Calvados department and Normandy region of north-western France.

== Geography ==
Hottot-les-Bagues lies 14 kilometres south-east of Bayeux.

== History ==
The fiefdom of Normandy was created for the Viking leader Rollo. Many of the remaining place names are of Norse origin. Hottot is believed to have taken its name from the Old Norse word haugr meaning mound or low hill.

During World War II, the Allied offensive in north-western Europe began with the Normandy landings of 6 June 1944. Within the surrounding district, there was much heavy fighting through June and July 1944 as Commonwealth forces tried to press on from Bayeux in an encircling movement to the south of Caen.

== Military cemetery ==
Hottot-les-Bagues military cemetery contains some 1,137 graves belonging to 965 British soldiers, 34 Canadians, 3 Australians, 2 New Zealanders and 1 South African, together with 132 German soldiers. Most of the war dead lost their lives in the second fortnight of June 1944, in the furious fighting around Tilly-sur-Seulles. The cemetery can be reached from Bayeux by taking the D6 southeast. After passing through Tilly-sur-Seulles, turn westward at Juvigny onto the main road (the D9) that runs from Caen towards Caumont l'Evente.

== Population ==
Historical population
Year	Pop.	±% p.a.
1968	323	—
1975	356	+1.40%
1982	370	+0.55%
1990	406	+1.17%
1999	470	+1.64%
2007	464	−0.16%
2012	486	+0.93%
2017	483	−0.12%
2023	452	−1.10%
Source: INSEE

== See also ==
- Communes of the Calvados department
- Duchy of Normandy
- Battle for Caen
