= Arrondissement of Bayeux =

Coordinates: 49°16′36″N 0°42′25″W

Bayeux
- Arrondissement
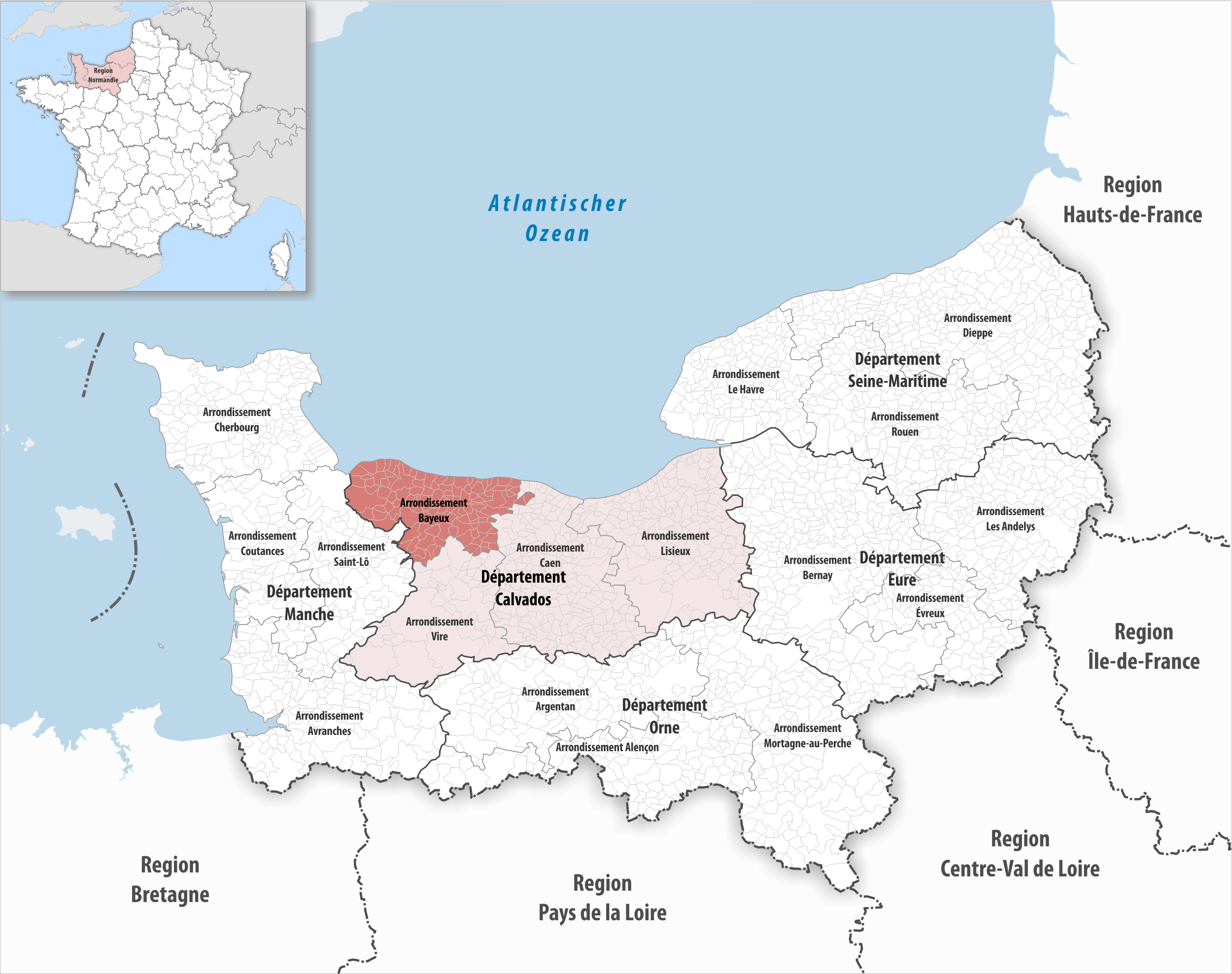
- Location within the region Normandy
- Country: France
- Region: Normandy
- Department: Calvados
- No. of communes: {{{nbcomm}}}
- Area: 976.6 km^{2} (377.1 sq mi)
- Population (2023): 73,808
  - Density: 75.58/km^{2} (195.7/sq mi)
- INSEE code: 141

The Arrondissement of Bayeux an arrondissement of France in the Calvados department in the Normandy region. It has 123 communes. Its population is 73,794 (2021), and its area is 976.6 km^{2} (377.1 sq mi).

== Composition ==
The communes of the arrondissement of Bayeux, and their INSEE codes, are:

1. Agy (14003)
2. Arganchy (14019)
3. Arromanches-les-Bains (14021)
4. Asnelles (14022)
5. Asnières-en-Bessin (14023)
6. Audrieu (14026)
7. Aure sur Mer (14591)
8. Balleroy-sur-Drôme (14035)
9. Banville (14038)
10. Barbeville (14040)
11. Bayeux (14047)
12. Bazenville (14049)
13. La Bazoque (14050)
14. Bény-sur-Mer (14062)
15. Bernesq (14063)
16. Blay (14078)
17. Le Breuil-en-Bessin (14103)
18. Bricqueville (14107)
19. Bucéels (14111)
20. Cahagnolles (14121)
21. La Cambe (14124)
22. Campigny (14130)
23. Canchy (14132)
24. Carcagny (14135)
25. Cardonville (14136)
26. Cartigny-l'Épinay (14138)
27. Castillon (14140)
28. Chouain (14159)
29. Colleville-sur-Mer (14165)
30. Colombières (14168)
31. Colombiers-sur-Seulles (14169)
32. Commes (14172)
33. Condé-sur-Seulles (14175)
34. Cormolain (14182)
35. Cottun (14184)
36. Crépon (14196)
37. Creully sur Seulles (14200)
38. Cricqueville-en-Bessin (14204)
39. Cristot (14205)
40. Crouay (14209)
41. Cussy (14214)
42. Deux-Jumeaux (14224)
43. Ducy-Sainte-Marguerite (14232)
44. Ellon (14236)
45. Englesqueville-la-Percée (14239)
46. Esquay-sur-Seulles (14250)
47. Étréham (14256)
48. La Folie (14272)
49. Fontaine-Henry (14275)
50. Fontenay-le-Pesnel (14278)
51. Formigny La Bataille (14281)
52. Foulognes (14282)
53. Géfosse-Fontenay (14298)
54. Grandcamp-Maisy (14312)
55. Graye-sur-Mer (14318)
56. Guéron (14322)
57. Hottot-les-Bagues (14336)
58. Isigny-sur-Mer (14342)
59. Juaye-Mondaye (14346)
60. Juvigny-sur-Seulles (14348)
61. Lingèvres (14364)
62. Lison (14367)
63. Litteau (14369)
64. Longues-sur-Mer (14377)
65. Longueville (14378)
66. Loucelles (14380)
67. Magny-en-Bessin (14385)
68. Maisons (14391)
69. Mandeville-en-Bessin (14397)
70. Le Manoir (14400)
71. Manvieux (14401)
72. Meuvaines (14430)
73. Le Molay-Littry (14370)
74. Monceaux-en-Bessin (14436)
75. Monfréville (14439)
76. Montfiquet (14445)
77. Mosles (14453)
78. Moulins en Bessin (14406)
79. Nonant (14465)
80. Noron-la-Poterie (14468)
81. Osmanville (14480)
82. Planquery (14506)
83. Ponts sur Seulles (14355)
84. Port-en-Bessin-Huppain (14515)
85. Ranchy (14529)
86. Rubercy (14547)
87. Ryes (14552)
88. Saint-Côme-de-Fresné (14565)
89. Sainte-Croix-sur-Mer (14569)
90. Sainte-Honorine-de-Ducy (14590)
91. Sainte-Marguerite-d'Elle (14614)
92. Saint-Germain-du-Pert (14586)
93. Saint-Laurent-sur-Mer (14605)
94. Saint-Loup-Hors (14609)
95. Saint-Marcouf (14613)
96. Saint-Martin-de-Blagny (14622)
97. Saint-Martin-des-Entrées (14630)
98. Saint-Paul-du-Vernay (14643)
99. Saint-Pierre-du-Mont (14652)
100. Saint-Vaast-sur-Seulles (14661)
101. Saint-Vigor-le-Grand (14663)
102. Sallen (14664)
103. Saon (14667)
104. Saonnet (14668)
105. Sommervieu (14676)
106. Subles (14679)
107. Sully (14680)
108. Surrain (14681)
109. Tessel (14684)
110. Tilly-sur-Seulles (14692)
111. Tour-en-Bessin (14700)
112. Tournières (14705)
113. Tracy-sur-Mer (14709)
114. Trévières (14711)
115. Le Tronquay (14714)
116. Trungy (14716)
117. Vaucelles (14728)
118. Vaux-sur-Aure (14732)
119. Vaux-sur-Seulles (14733)
120. Vendes (14734)
121. Ver-sur-Mer (14739)
122. Vienne-en-Bessin (14744)
123. Vierville-sur-Mer (14745)

== History ==
The arrondissement of Bayeux was created in 1800. At the January 2017 reorganisation of the arrondissements of Calvados, it lost four communes to the arrondissement of Vire, and it gained 19 communes from the arrondissement of Caen.

As a result of the reorganisation of the cantons of France which came into effect in 2015, the borders of the cantons are no longer related to the borders of the arrondissements. The cantons of the arrondissement of Bayeux were, as of January 2015:

1. Balleroy
2. Bayeux
3. Caumont-l'Éventé
4. Isigny-sur-Mer
5. Ryes
6. Trévières
