= Cristot =

- Commune
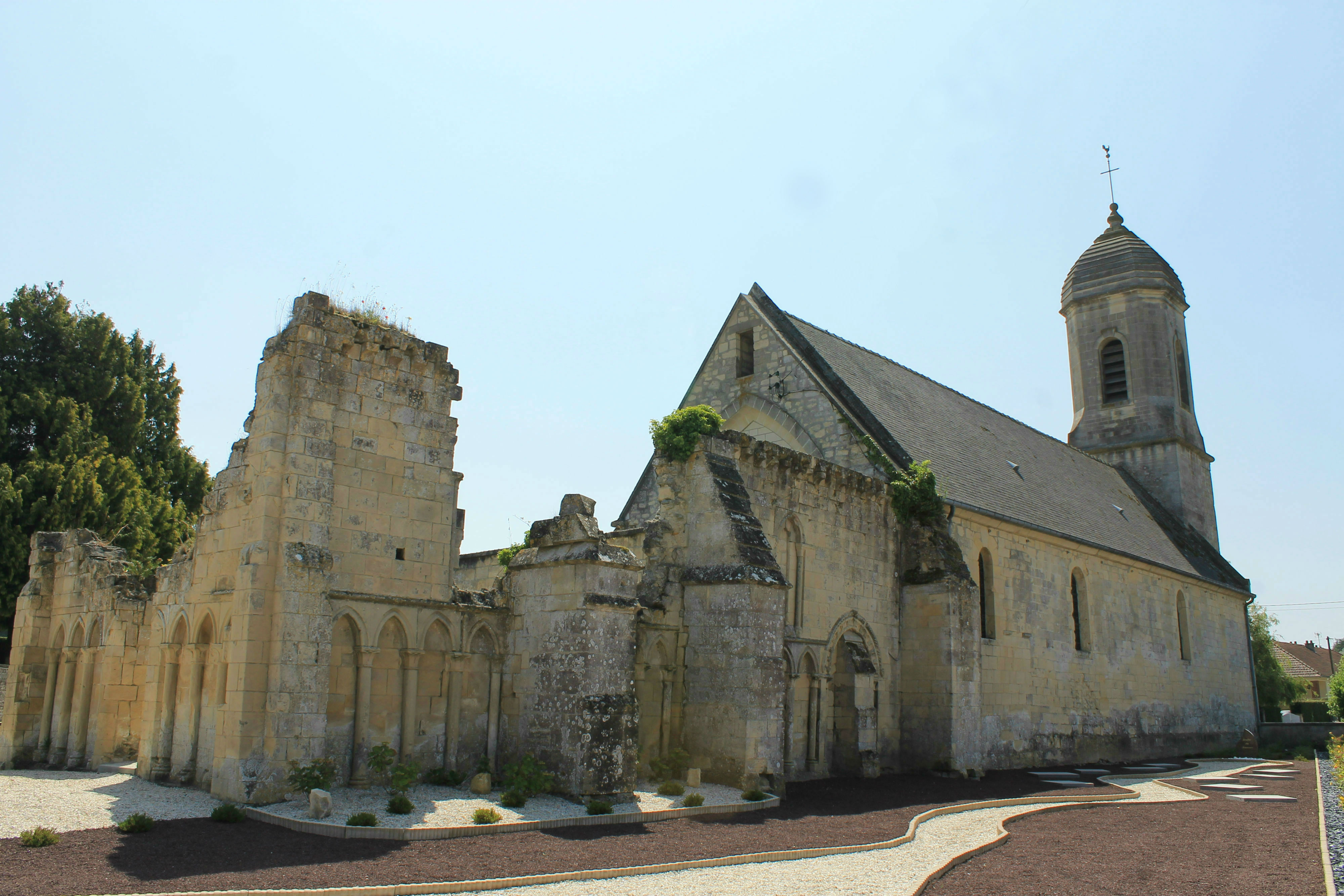
- The church in Cristot

- Coat of arms
- Location of Cristot
- Location within France Location within Normandy
- Coordinates: 49°11′43″N 0°34′46″W
- Country: France
- Region: Normandy
- Department: Calvados
- Arrondissement: Bayeux
- Canton: Thue et Mue
- Intercommunality: CC Seulles Terre Mer

Government
  - Mayor (2020–2026): Sylvie Le Bugle
- Area^{1}: 3.92 km^{2} (1.51 sq mi)
- Elevation: 100 m (330 ft)
- Highest elevation: 106 m (348 ft)
- Lowest elevation: 66 m (217 ft)
- Population (2023): 207
  - Density: 52.8/km^{2} (137/sq mi)
- Time zone: UTC+01:00 (CET)
  - Summer (DST): UTC+02:00 (CEST)
- INSEE/Postal code: 14205 /14250
- ^{1} French Land Register data, which excludes lakes, ponds, glaciers > 1 km^{2} (0.386 sq mi or 247 acres) and river estuaries.

Cristot is a commune in the Calvados department and Normandy region of north-western France.

== Population ==
Historical population
Year	Pop.	±% p.a.
1968	146	—
1975	142	−0.40%
1982	133	−0.93%
1990	152	+1.68%
1999	160	+0.57%
2007	208	+3.33%
2012	215	+0.66%
2017	214	−0.09%
2023	207	−0.55%
Source: INSEE

== See also ==
- Communes of the Calvados department
