= Meuvaines =

- Commune
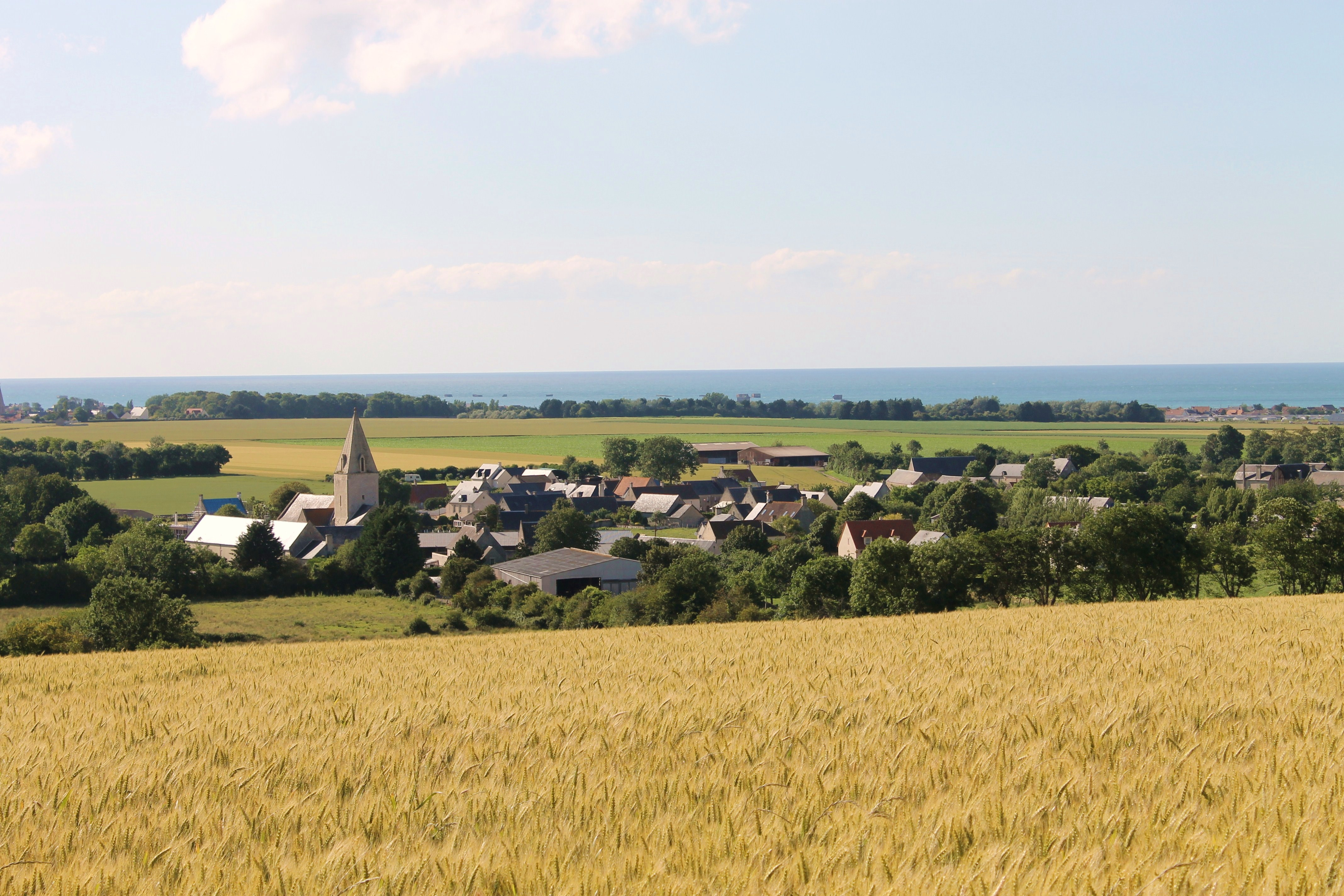
- A general view of Meuvaines

- Coat of arms
- Location of Meuvaines
- Location within France Location within Normandy
- Coordinates: 49°19′41″N 0°33′55″W
- Country: France
- Region: Normandy
- Department: Calvados
- Arrondissement: Bayeux
- Canton: Courseulles-sur-Mer
- Intercommunality: CC Seulles Terre Mer

Government
  - Mayor (2020–2026): Gilles Tabourel
- Area^{1}: 7.36 km^{2} (2.84 sq mi)
- Elevation: 40 m (130 ft)
- Highest elevation: 63 m (207 ft)
- Lowest elevation: 2 m (6.6 ft)
- Population (2023): 136
  - Density: 18.5/km^{2} (47.9/sq mi)
- Time zone: UTC+01:00 (CET)
  - Summer (DST): UTC+02:00 (CEST)
- INSEE/Postal code: 14430 /14960
- ^{1} French Land Register data, which excludes lakes, ponds, glaciers > 1 km^{2} (0.386 sq mi or 247 acres) and river estuaries.

Meuvaines (French pronunciation: [møvɛn]) is a commune in the Calvados department in the Normandy region in northwestern France.

== Population ==
Historical population
Year	Pop.	±% p.a.
1968	175	—
1975	163	−1.01%
1982	137	−2.45%
1990	137	+0.00%
1999	150	+1.01%
2007	144	−0.51%
2012	152	+1.09%
2017	144	−1.08%
2023	136	−0.95%
Source: INSEE

== See also ==
- Communes of the Calvados department
