= Saint-Vaast-sur-Seulles =

- Commune
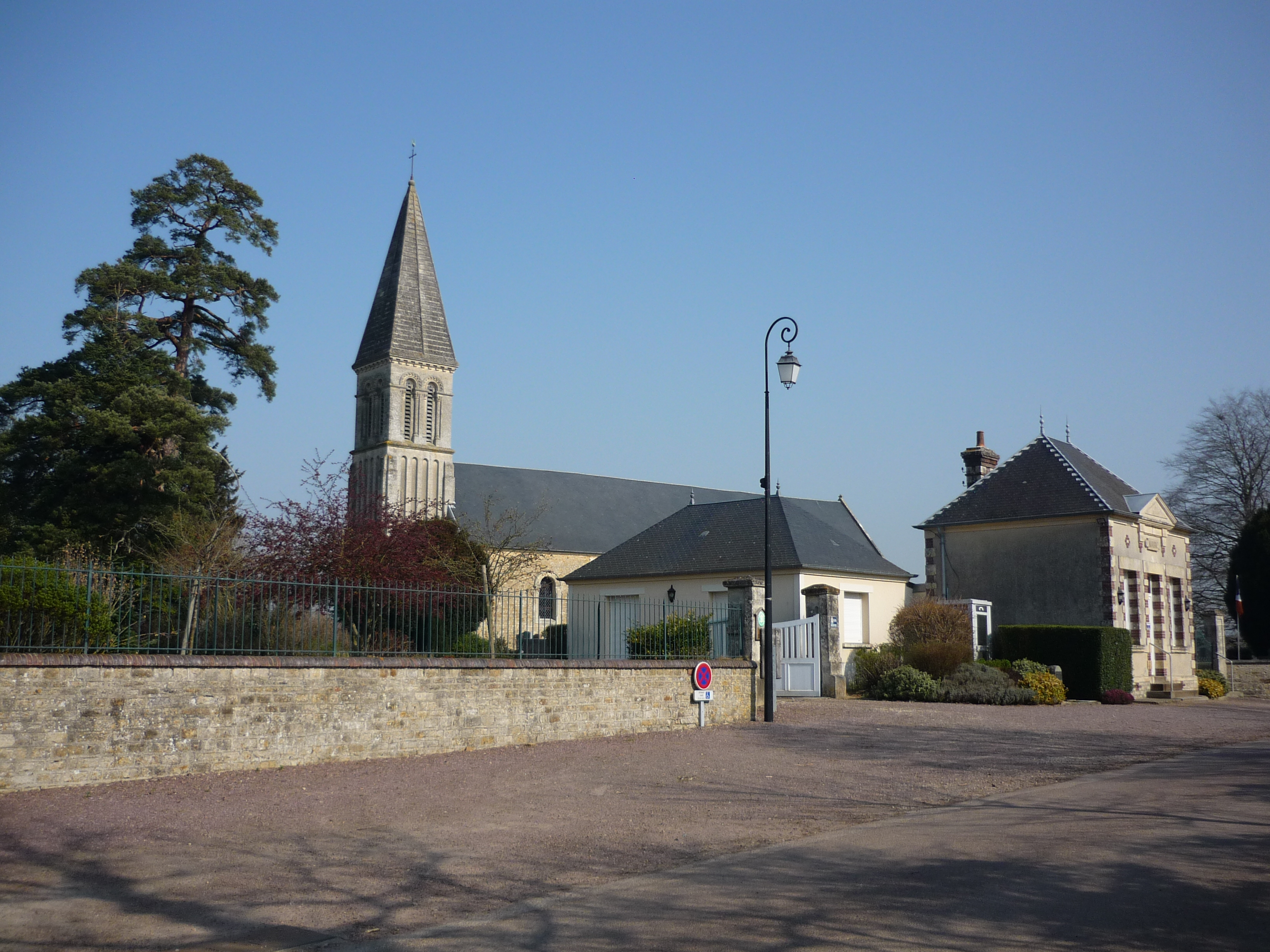
- The church and town hall in Saint-Vaast-sur-Seulles

- Coat of arms
- Location of Saint-Vaast-sur-Seulles
- Location within France Location within Normandy
- Coordinates: 49°08′34″N 0°37′54″W
- Country: France
- Region: Normandy
- Department: Calvados
- Arrondissement: Bayeux
- Canton: Thue et Mue
- Intercommunality: CC Seulles Terre Mer

Government
  - Mayor (2020–2026): André Marie
- Area^{1}: 4.25 km^{2} (1.64 sq mi)
- Elevation: 120 m (390 ft)
- Highest elevation: 125 m (410 ft)
- Lowest elevation: 57 m (187 ft)
- Population (2023): 161
  - Density: 37.9/km^{2} (98.1/sq mi)
- Time zone: UTC+01:00 (CET)
  - Summer (DST): UTC+02:00 (CEST)
- INSEE/Postal code: 14661 /14250
- ^{1} French Land Register data, which excludes lakes, ponds, glaciers > 1 km^{2} (0.386 sq mi or 247 acres) and river estuaries.

Saint-Vaast-sur-Seulles (French pronunciation: [sɛ̃ vast syʁ sœl]) is a commune in the Calvados department in the Normandy region in northwestern France.

== Population ==
Historical population
Year	Pop.	±% p.a.
1968	127	—
1975	129	+0.22%
1982	109	−2.38%
1990	115	+0.67%
1999	134	+1.71%
2007	138	+0.37%
2012	137	−0.15%
2017	147	+1.42%
2023	161	+1.53%
Source: INSEE

== See also ==
- Communes of the Calvados department
