= Vendes =

- Commune
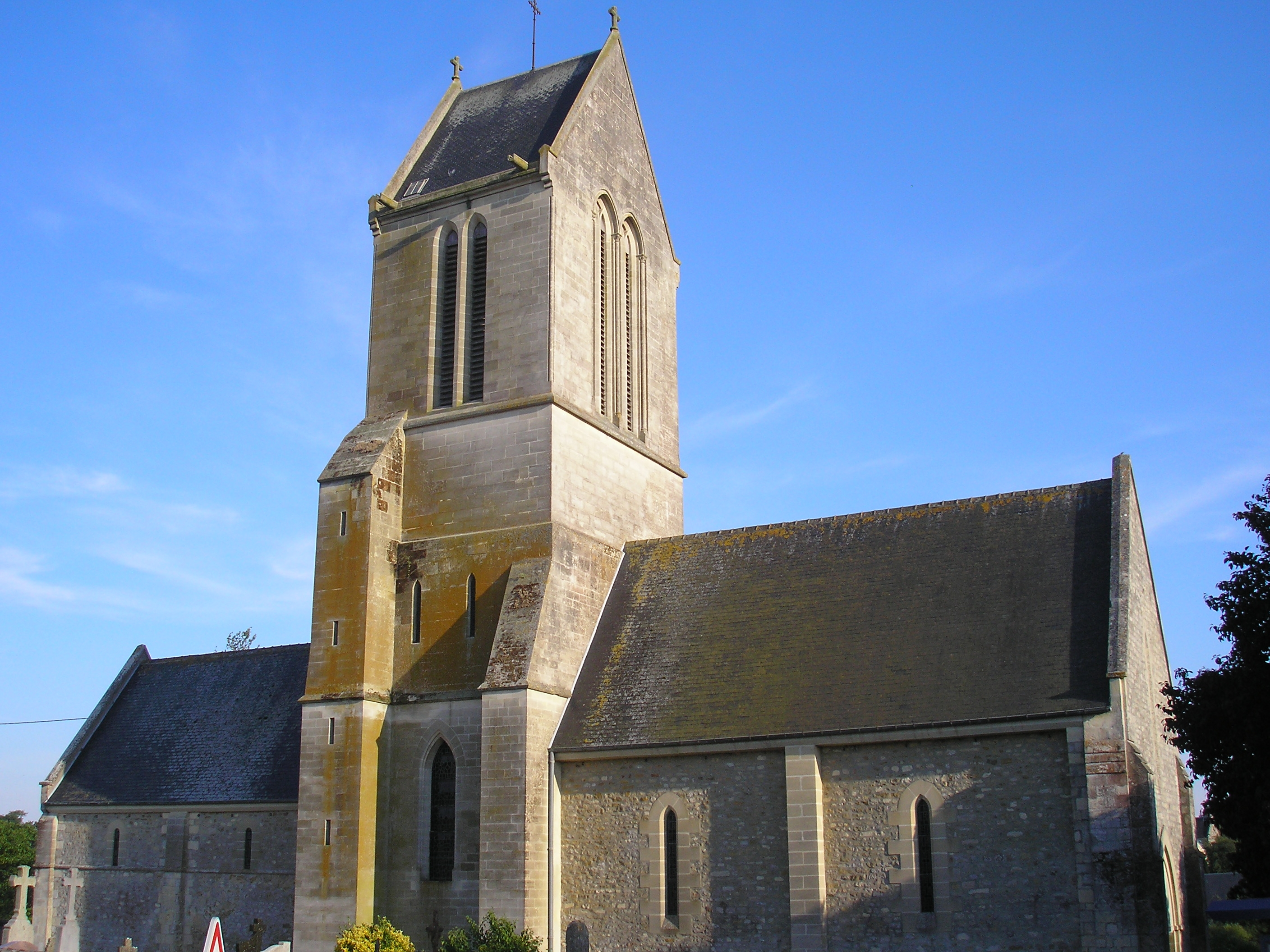
- The church in Vendes
- Location of Vendes
- Location within France Location within Normandy
- Coordinates: 49°08′54″N 0°35′45″W
- Country: France
- Region: Normandy
- Department: Calvados
- Arrondissement: Bayeux
- Canton: Thue et Mue
- Intercommunality: CC Seulles Terre Mer

Government
  - Mayor (2020–2026): Gérard Lecoq
- Area^{1}: 3.47 km^{2} (1.34 sq mi)
- Elevation: 117 m (384 ft)
- Highest elevation: 130 m (430 ft)
- Lowest elevation: 62 m (203 ft)
- Population (2023): 341
  - Density: 98.3/km^{2} (255/sq mi)
- Time zone: UTC+01:00 (CET)
  - Summer (DST): UTC+02:00 (CEST)
- INSEE/Postal code: 14734 /14250
- ^{1} French Land Register data, which excludes lakes, ponds, glaciers > 1 km^{2} (0.386 sq mi or 247 acres) and river estuaries.

Vendes (French pronunciation: [vɑ̃d]) is a commune in the Calvados department in the Normandy region in northwestern France.

== Population ==
Historical population
Year	Pop.	±% p.a.
1968	199	—
1975	215	+1.11%
1982	273	+3.47%
1990	293	+0.89%
1999	283	−0.39%
2007	301	+0.77%
2012	309	+0.53%
2017	320	+0.70%
2023	341	+1.06%
Source: INSEE

== See also ==
- Communes of the Calvados department
