= Saint-Côme-de-Fresné =

- Commune
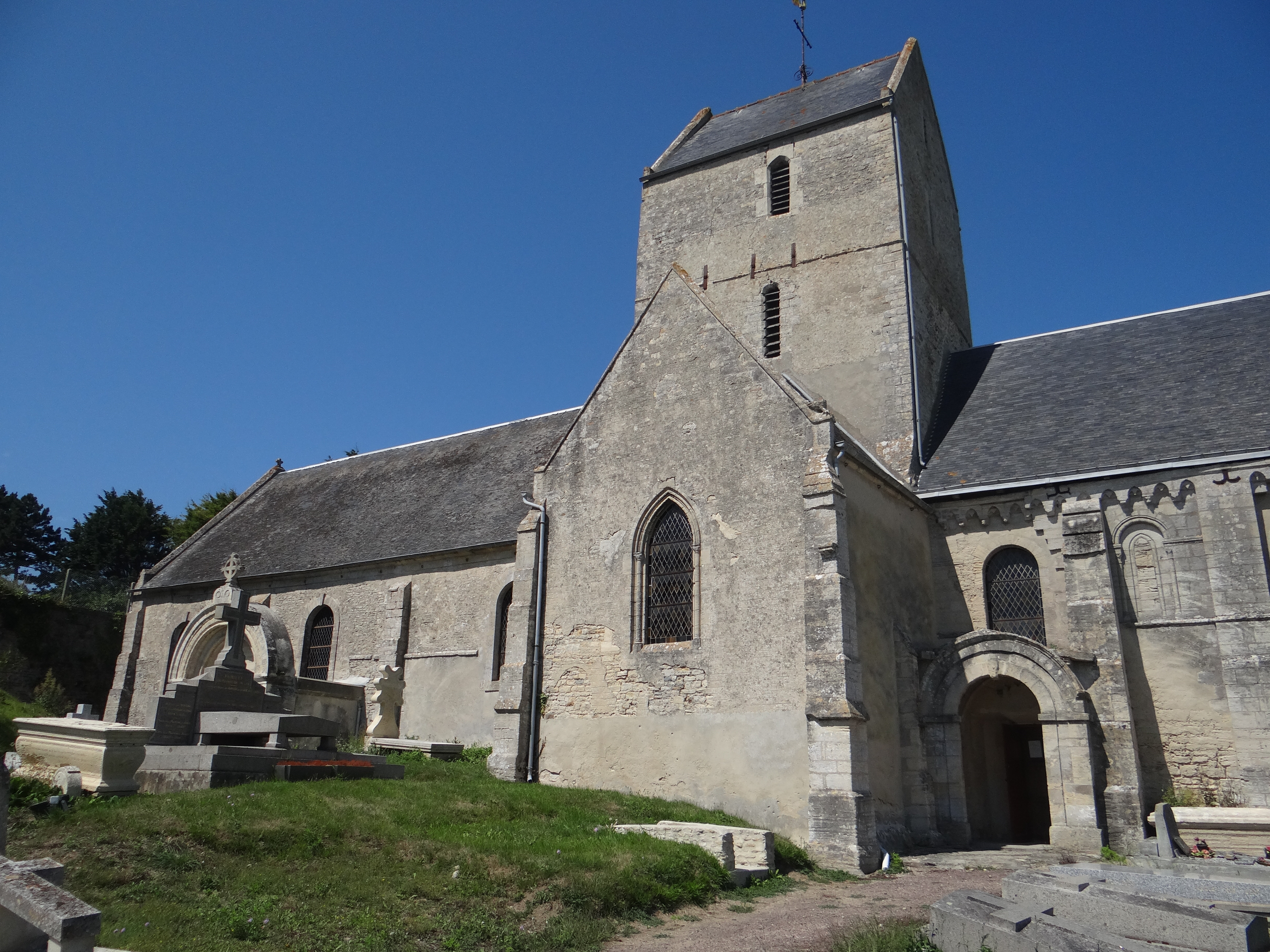
- The church in Saint-Côme-de-Fresné

- Coat of arms
- Location of Saint-Côme-de-Fresné
- Location within France Location within Normandy
- Coordinates: 49°20′06″N 0°36′18″W
- Country: France
- Region: Normandy
- Department: Calvados
- Arrondissement: Bayeux
- Canton: Courseulles-sur-Mer
- Intercommunality: CC Bayeux Intercom

Government
  - Mayor (2020–2026): Bernard Kermoal
- Area^{1}: 4.31 km^{2} (1.66 sq mi)
- Elevation: 19 m (62 ft)
- Highest elevation: 58 m (190 ft)
- Lowest elevation: 0 m (0 ft)
- Population (2023): 256
  - Density: 59.4/km^{2} (154/sq mi)
- Time zone: UTC+01:00 (CET)
  - Summer (DST): UTC+02:00 (CEST)
- INSEE/Postal code: 14565 /14960
- ^{1} French Land Register data, which excludes lakes, ponds, glaciers > 1 km^{2} (0.386 sq mi or 247 acres) and river estuaries.

Saint-Côme-de-Fresné (French pronunciation: [sɛ̃ kom də fʁɛne]) is a commune in the Calvados department in the Normandy region in northwestern France.

== Population ==
Historical population
Year	Pop.	±% p.a.
1968	143	—
1975	147	+0.39%
1982	155	+0.76%
1990	171	+1.24%
1999	224	+3.05%
2007	223	−0.06%
2012	245	+1.90%
2017	263	+1.43%
2023	256	−0.45%
Source: INSEE

== See also ==
- Communes of the Calvados department
