= Carcagny =

- Commune
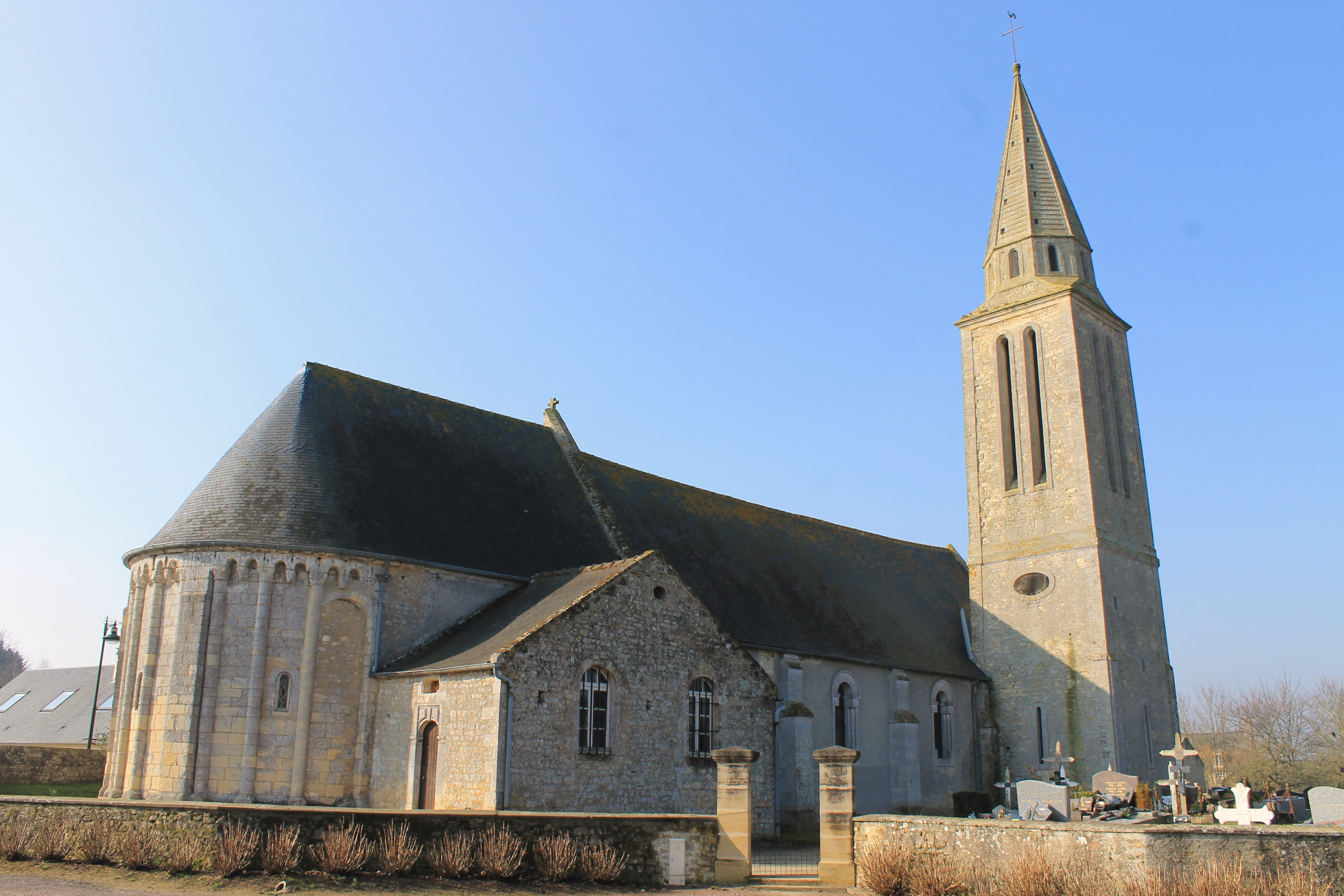
- The church in Carcagny
- Location of Carcagny
- Location within France Location within Normandy
- Coordinates: 49°14′23″N 0°37′03″W
- Country: France
- Region: Normandy
- Department: Calvados
- Arrondissement: Bayeux
- Canton: Thue et Mue
- Intercommunality: CC Seulles Terre Mer

Government
  - Mayor (2020–2026): Marie-France Bouvet-Penard
- Area^{1}: 4.15 km^{2} (1.60 sq mi)
- Elevation: 52 m (171 ft)
- Highest elevation: 87 m (285 ft)
- Lowest elevation: 27 m (89 ft)
- Population (2023): 272
  - Density: 65.5/km^{2} (170/sq mi)
- Time zone: UTC+01:00 (CET)
  - Summer (DST): UTC+02:00 (CEST)
- INSEE/Postal code: 14135 /14740
- ^{1} French Land Register data, which excludes lakes, ponds, glaciers > 1 km^{2} (0.386 sq mi or 247 acres) and river estuaries.

Carcagny (French pronunciation: [kaʁkaɲi]) is a commune in the Calvados department in the Normandy region in northwestern France.

== Population ==
Historical population
Year	Pop.	±% p.a.
1968	192	—
1975	211	+1.36%
1982	242	+1.98%
1990	250	+0.41%
1999	276	+1.11%
2007	272	−0.18%
2012	320	+3.30%
2017	281	−2.57%
2023	272	−0.54%
Source: INSEE

== See also ==
- Communes of the Calvados department
