= Fontenay-le-Pesnel =

- Commune
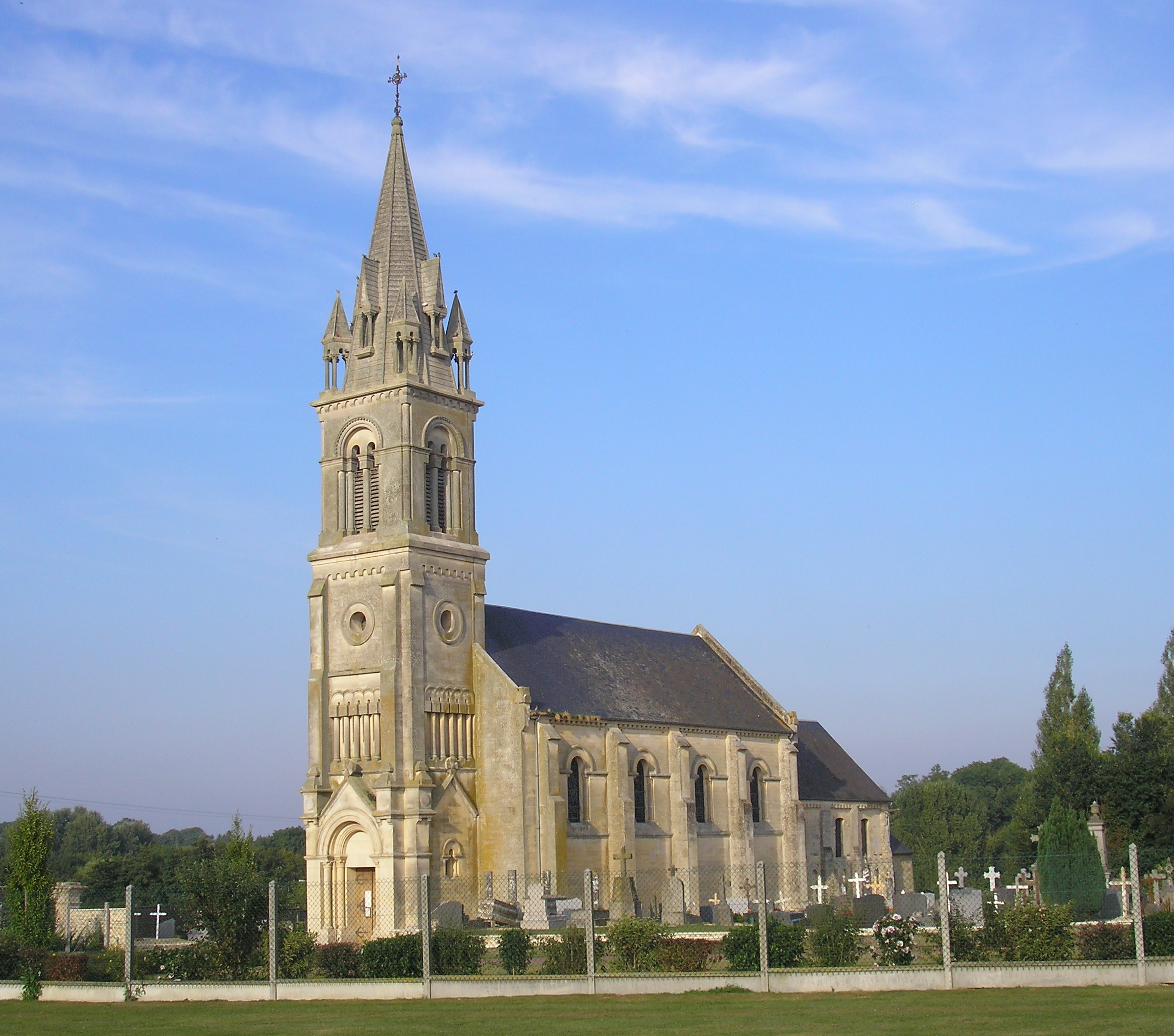
- The church in Fontenay-le-Pesnel
- Location of Fontenay-le-Pesnel
- Location within France Location within Normandy
- Coordinates: 49°10′16″N 0°34′43″W
- Country: France
- Region: Normandy
- Department: Calvados
- Arrondissement: Bayeux
- Canton: Thue et Mue
- Intercommunality: CC Seulles Terre Mer

Government
  - Mayor (2020–2026): Richard Villechenon
- Area^{1}: 10.07 km^{2} (3.89 sq mi)
- Elevation: 80 m (260 ft)
- Highest elevation: 114 m (374 ft)
- Lowest elevation: 51 m (167 ft)
- Population (2023): 1,258
  - Density: 124.9/km^{2} (323.6/sq mi)
- Time zone: UTC+01:00 (CET)
  - Summer (DST): UTC+02:00 (CEST)
- INSEE/Postal code: 14278 /14250
- ^{1} French Land Register data, which excludes lakes, ponds, glaciers > 1 km^{2} (0.386 sq mi or 247 acres) and river estuaries.

Fontenay-le-Pesnel (French pronunciation: [fɔ̃tnɛ lə pɛnɛl]) is a commune in the Calvados department in the Normandy region in northwestern France.

== Population ==
Historical population
Year	Pop.	±% p.a.
1968	475	—
1975	449	−0.80%
1982	828	+9.14%
1990	902	+1.08%
1999	938	+0.44%
2007	916	−0.30%
2012	1,054	+2.85%
2017	1,160	+1.94%
2023	1,258	+1.36%
Source: INSEE

== See also ==
- Communes of the Calvados department
