= Tessel =

- Commune
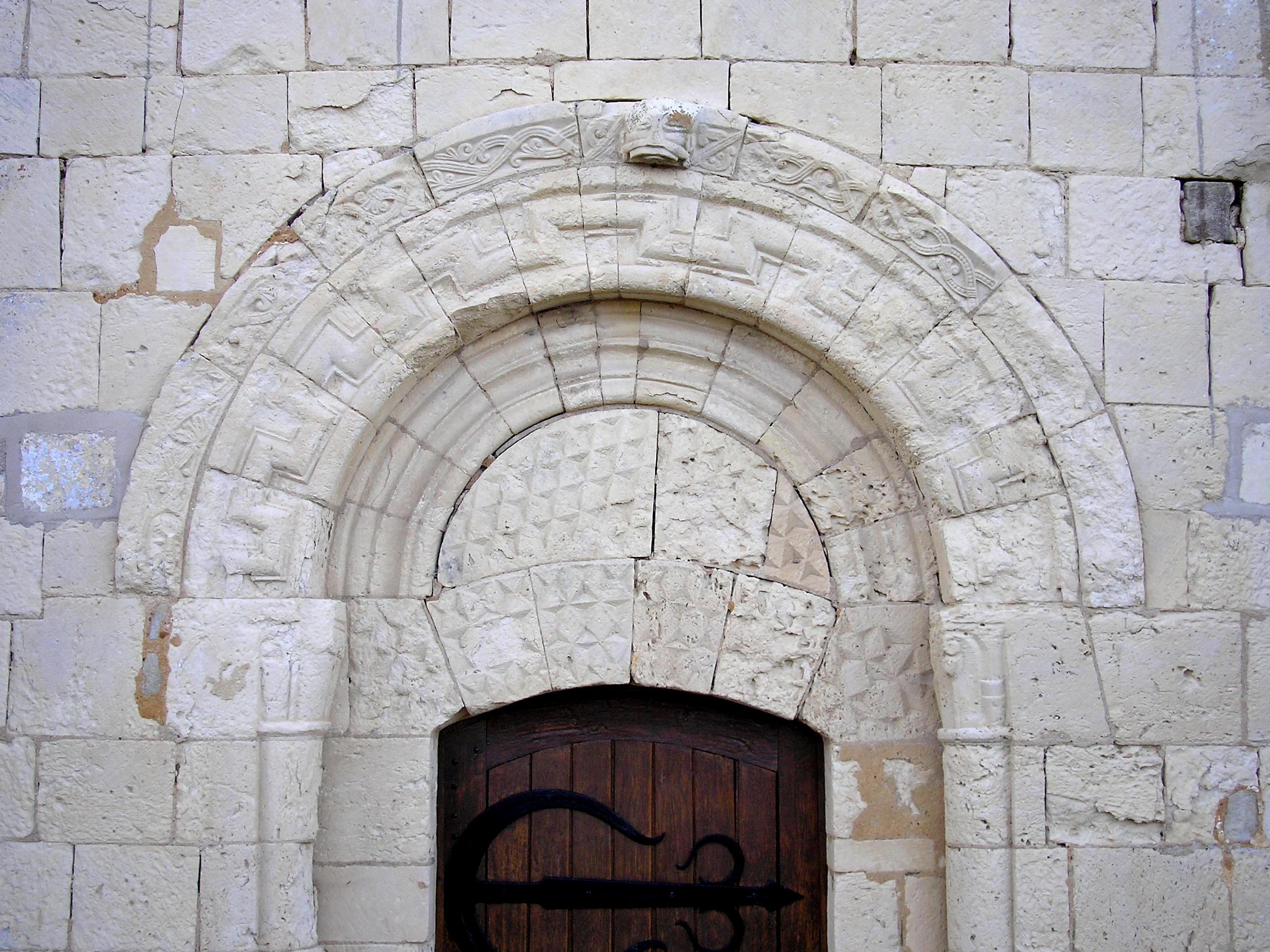
- The doorway of the church in Tessel
- Location of Tessel
- Location within France Location within Normandy
- Coordinates: 49°09′12″N 0°34′23″W
- Country: France
- Region: Normandy
- Department: Calvados
- Arrondissement: Bayeux
- Canton: Thue et Mue
- Intercommunality: CC Seulles Terre Mer

Government
  - Mayor (2020–2026): Alain Paysant
- Area^{1}: 5.54 km^{2} (2.14 sq mi)
- Elevation: 117 m (384 ft)
- Highest elevation: 122 m (400 ft)
- Lowest elevation: 79 m (259 ft)
- Population (2023): 243
  - Density: 43.9/km^{2} (114/sq mi)
- Time zone: UTC+01:00 (CET)
  - Summer (DST): UTC+02:00 (CEST)
- INSEE/Postal code: 14684 /14250
- ^{1} French Land Register data, which excludes lakes, ponds, glaciers > 1 km^{2} (0.386 sq mi or 247 acres) and river estuaries.

Tessel (French pronunciation: [tɛsɛl]) is a commune in the Calvados department in the Normandy region in northwestern France.

== Population ==
Historical population
Year	Pop.	±% p.a.
1968	166	—
1975	189	+1.87%
1982	178	−0.85%
1990	168	−0.72%
1999	173	+0.33%
2007	237	+4.01%
2012	232	−0.43%
2017	249	+1.42%
2023	243	−0.41%
Source: INSEE

== See also ==
- Communes of the Calvados department
