= Lingèvres =

- Commune
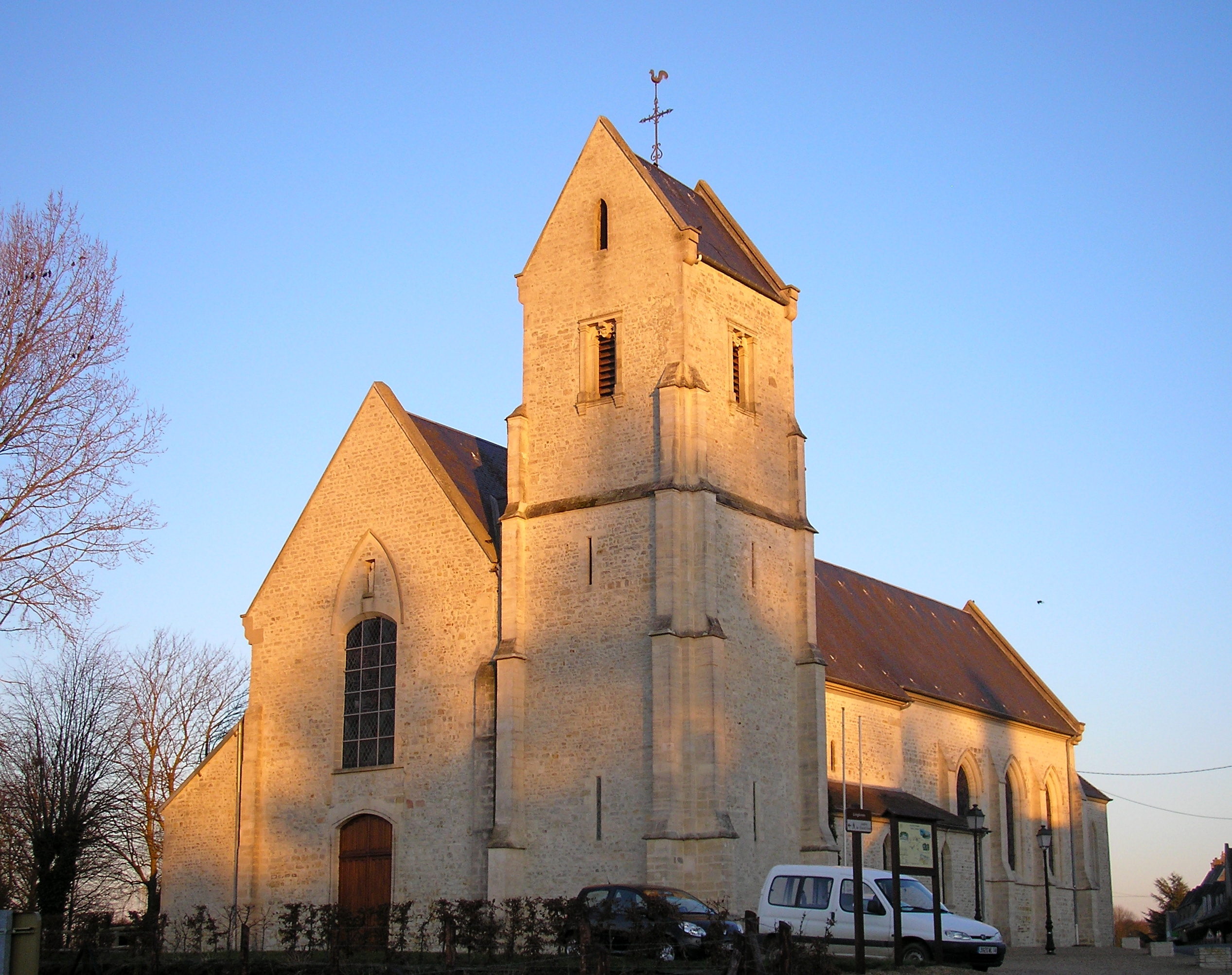
- Church in Lingèvres
- Location of Lingèvres
- Location within France Location within Normandy
- Coordinates: 49°10′32″N 0°40′18″W
- Country: France
- Region: Normandy
- Department: Calvados
- Arrondissement: Bayeux
- Canton: Les Monts d'Aunay
- Intercommunality: CC Seulles Terre Mer

Government
  - Mayor (2020–2026): Christelle Crocomo
- Area^{1}: 14.46 km^{2} (5.58 sq mi)
- Elevation: 114 m (374 ft)
- Highest elevation: 137 m (449 ft)
- Lowest elevation: 61 m (200 ft)
- Population (2023): 448
  - Density: 31.0/km^{2} (80.2/sq mi)
- Time zone: UTC+01:00 (CET)
  - Summer (DST): UTC+02:00 (CEST)
- INSEE/Postal code: 14364 /14250
- ^{1} French Land Register data, which excludes lakes, ponds, glaciers > 1 km^{2} (0.386 sq mi or 247 acres) and river estuaries.

Lingèvres (French pronunciation: [lɛ̃ʒɛvʁ]) is a commune in the Calvados department in the Normandy region in northwestern France.

== Population ==
Historical population
Year	Pop.	±% p.a.
1968	535	—
1975	493	−1.16%
1982	455	−1.14%
1990	464	+0.25%
1999	458	−0.14%
2007	496	+1.00%
2012	490	−0.24%
2017	464	−1.08%
2023	448	−0.58%
Source: INSEE

== See also ==
- Communes of the Calvados department
