= Rosel, Calvados =

Rosel
- Commune
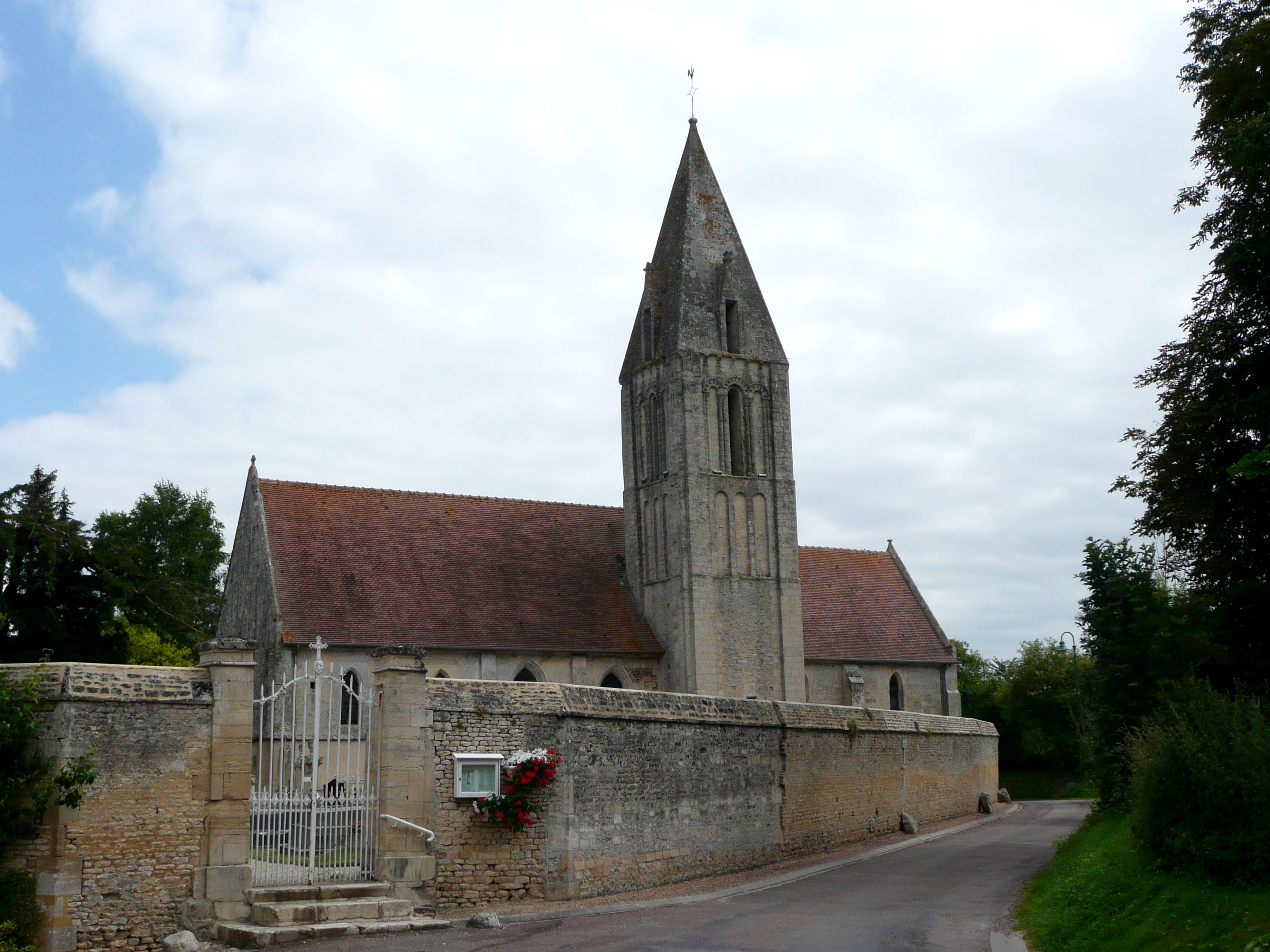
- Saint Martin

- Coat of arms
- Location of Rosel
- Location within France Location within Normandy
- Coordinates: 49°13′47″N 0°27′25″W
- Country: France
- Region: Normandy
- Department: Calvados
- Arrondissement: Caen
- Canton: Thue et Mue
- Intercommunality: CU Caen la Mer

Government
  - Mayor (2020–2026): Véronique Masson
- Area^{1}: 3.90 km^{2} (1.51 sq mi)
- Elevation: 47 m (154 ft)
- Highest elevation: 68 m (223 ft)
- Lowest elevation: 37 m (121 ft)
- Population (2023): 696
  - Density: 178/km^{2} (462/sq mi)
- Time zone: UTC+01:00 (CET)
  - Summer (DST): UTC+02:00 (CEST)
- INSEE/Postal code: 14542 /14740
- ^{1} French Land Register data, which excludes lakes, ponds, glaciers > 1 km^{2} (0.386 sq mi or 247 acres) and river estuaries.

Rosel (French pronunciation: [ʁɔzɛl]) is a commune in the Calvados department in the Normandy region in northwestern France.

== Population ==
Historical population
Year	Pop.	±% p.a.
1968	280	—
1975	317	+1.79%
1982	373	+2.35%
1990	543	+4.81%
1999	558	+0.30%
2007	503	−1.29%
2012	568	+2.46%
2017	541	−0.97%
2023	696	+4.29%
Source: INSEE

== See also ==
- Communes of the Calvados department
