= Seulles =

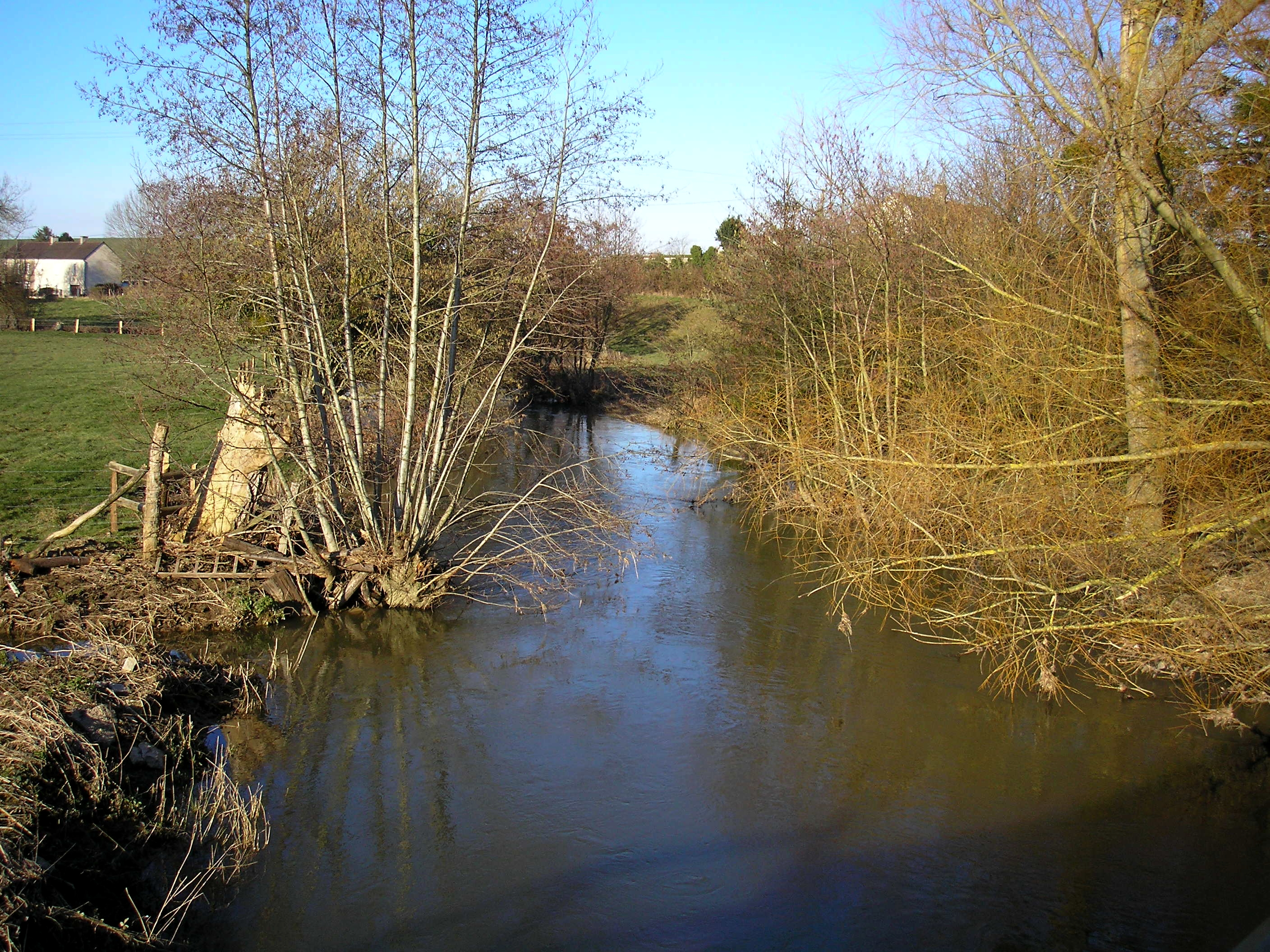
- The Seulles between Bucéels and Audrieu

- Location within France Location within Normandy

Location
- Country: France

Physical characteristics
- Mouth
  - location: English Channel
  - coordinates: 49.3375°N 0.4569°W
- Length: 71.7 km (44.6 mi)

The Seulles (French pronunciation: [sœl]) is a river in Normandy, France. Its tributaries include the Thue, Mue, and Seulline. It is 71.7 km (44.6 mi) long.
