= Canton of Thue et Mue =

Coordinates: 49.21°N 0.51°W

Thue et Mue
- Canton
- Interactive map of Thue et Mue
- Country: France
- Region: Normandy
- Department: Calvados
- No. of communes: {{{nbcomm}}}

Government
  - Representatives (2021–2028): Philippe Laurent; Myriam Letellier
- Area: 229.41 km^{2} (88.58 sq mi)
- Population (2023): 29,245
  - Density: 127.48/km^{2} (330.17/sq mi)
- INSEE code: 14 03

The canton of Thue et Mue (before 2021: Bretteville-l'Orgueilleuse) is an administrative division of the Calvados department, northwestern France. It was created at the French canton reorganisation which came into effect in March 2015. Its seat is in Thue et Mue.

== Composition ==
It consists of the following communes:

1. Audrieu
2. Bény-sur-Mer
3. Bucéels
4. Cairon
5. Carcagny
6. Colombiers-sur-Seulles
7. Creully sur Seulles
8. Cristot
9. Ducy-Sainte-Marguerite
10. Fontaine-Henry
11. Fontenay-le-Pesnel
12. Le Fresne-Camilly
13. Juvigny-sur-Seulles
14. Loucelles
15. Moulins en Bessin
16. Ponts sur Seulles
17. Reviers
18. Rosel
19. Rots
20. Saint-Manvieu-Norrey
21. Saint-Vaast-sur-Seulles
22. Tessel
23. Thaon
24. Thue et Mue
25. Tilly-sur-Seulles
26. Vendes

== Councillors ==
Election	Councillors	Party	Occupation
2015	Philippe Laurent	LR	Mayor of Moulins en Bessin; Delegate mayor of Martragny
2015	Véronique Martinez	LR	Councillor of Saint-Manvieu-Norrey
2021	Philippe Laurent	DVD	Technical manager in real estate
2021	Véronique Martinez	DVD	Councillor of Thue et Mue

== Pictures of the canton ==
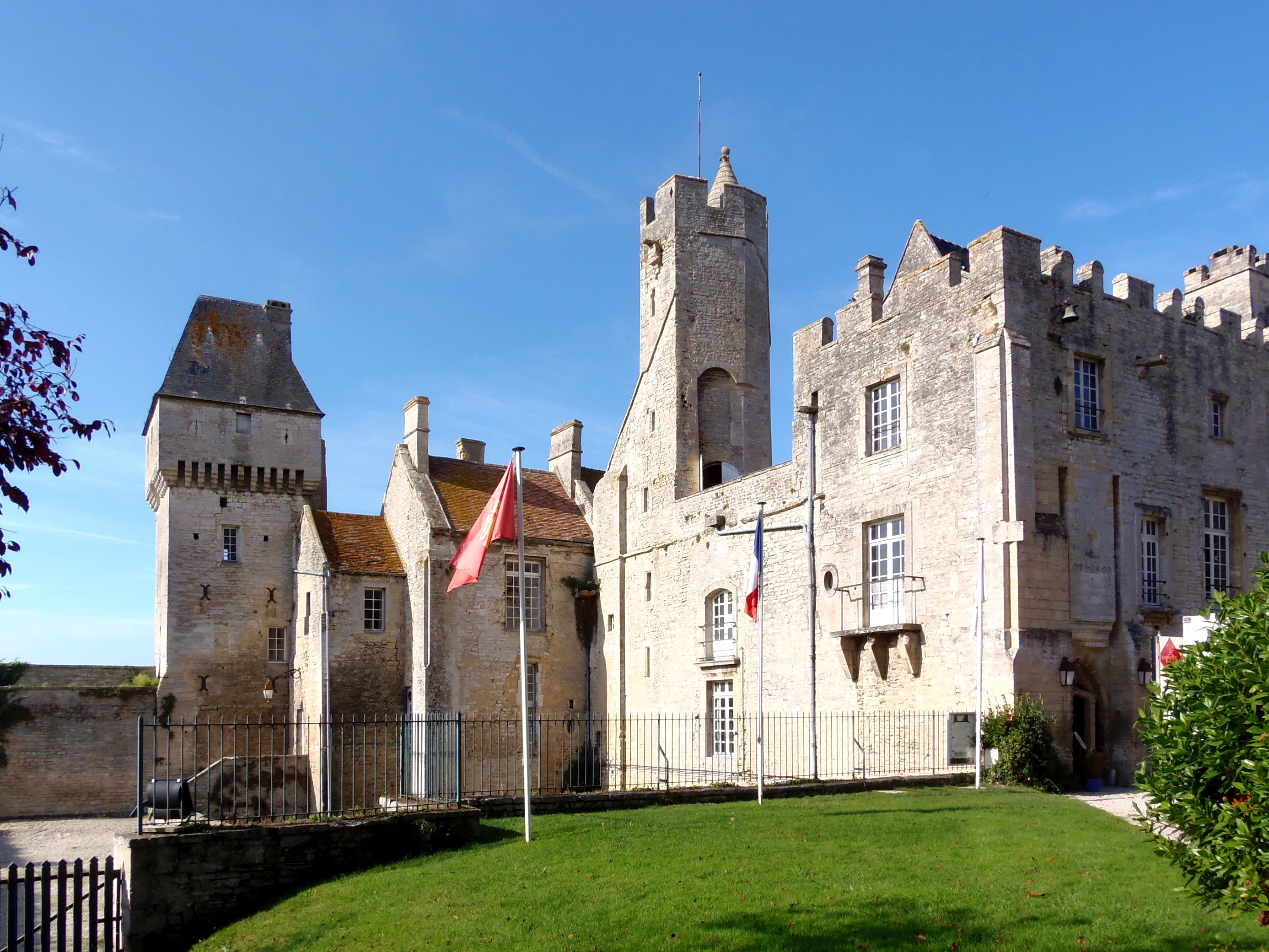
Château de Creully

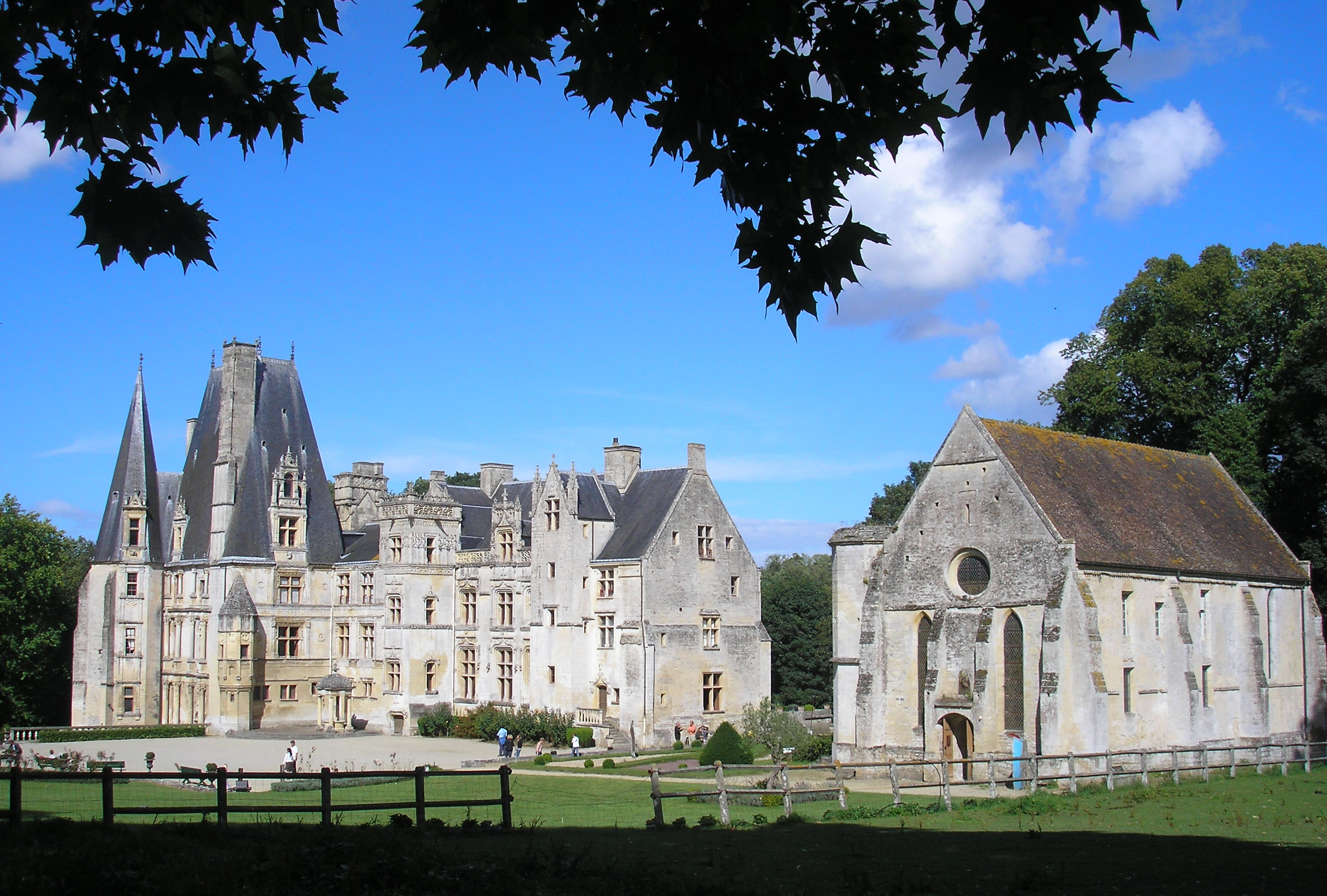
Castle of Fontaine-Henry

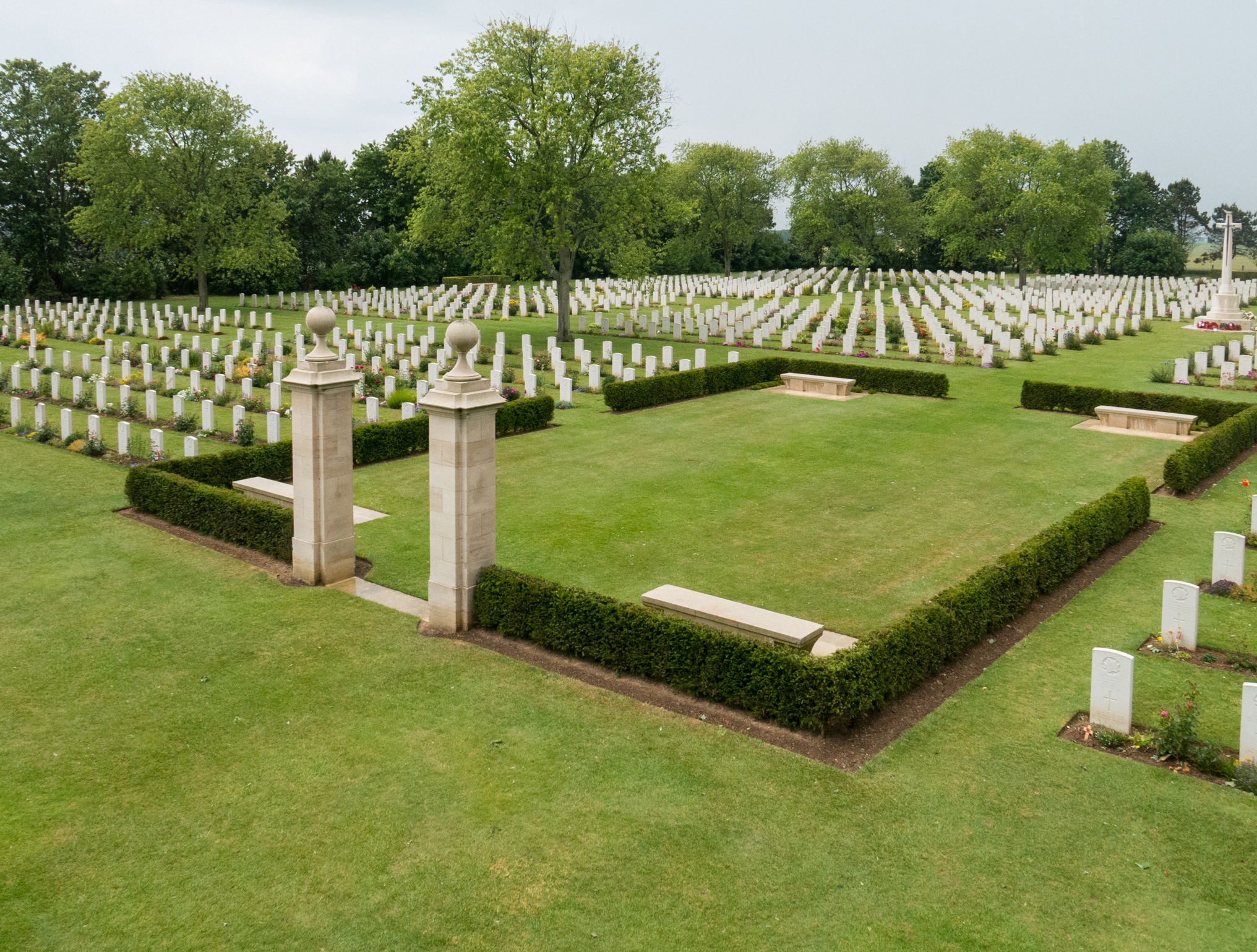
Bény-sur-Mer Canadian War Cemetery
