= Communauté de communes Seulles Terre et Mer =

Intercommunal structure in Normandy, France

Seulles Terre et Mer
- Communauté de communes
- Location within the department
- Coordinates: 49°17′N 00°32′W
- Country: France
- Region: Normandy
- Department: Calvados
- No. of communes: {{{nbcomm}}}
- Established: 2017

Government
  - President: Thierry Ozenne
- Area: 195.9 km^{2} (75.6 sq mi)
- Population (2021): 17,461
  - Density: 89.13/km^{2} (230.9/sq mi)
- Website: seulles-terre-mer.fr

Seulle Terre et Mer is the intercommunal structure centered on the town of Creully sur Seulles. It is located in the Calvados department in the region of Normandy, northwestern France. It was created in 2017 and its seat is in Creully sur Seulles. Its area is 195.9 square kilometers. As of 2021 the population was 17,461, with 2,266 people living in Creully sur Seulles.

== Composition ==
Seulles Terre et Mer is made up of the following 28 communes:

1. Asnelles
2. Audrieu
3. Banville
4. Bazenville
5. Bény-sur-Mer
6. Bucéels
7. Carcagny
8. Colombiers-sur-Seulles
9. Crépon
10. Creully sur Seulles
11. Cristot
12. Ducy-Sainte-Marguerite
13. Fontaine-Henry
14. Fontenay-le-Pesnel
15. Graye-sur-Mer
16. Hottot-les-Bagues
17. Juvigny-sur-Seulles
18. Lingèvres
19. Loucelles
20. Meuvaines
21. Moulins en Bessin
22. Ponts sur Seulles
23. Saint-Vaast-sur-Seulles
24. Sainte-Croix-sur-Mer
25. Tessel
26. Tilly-sur-Seulles
27. Vendes
28. Ver-sur-Mer
