= Fontaine-Henry =

- Commune
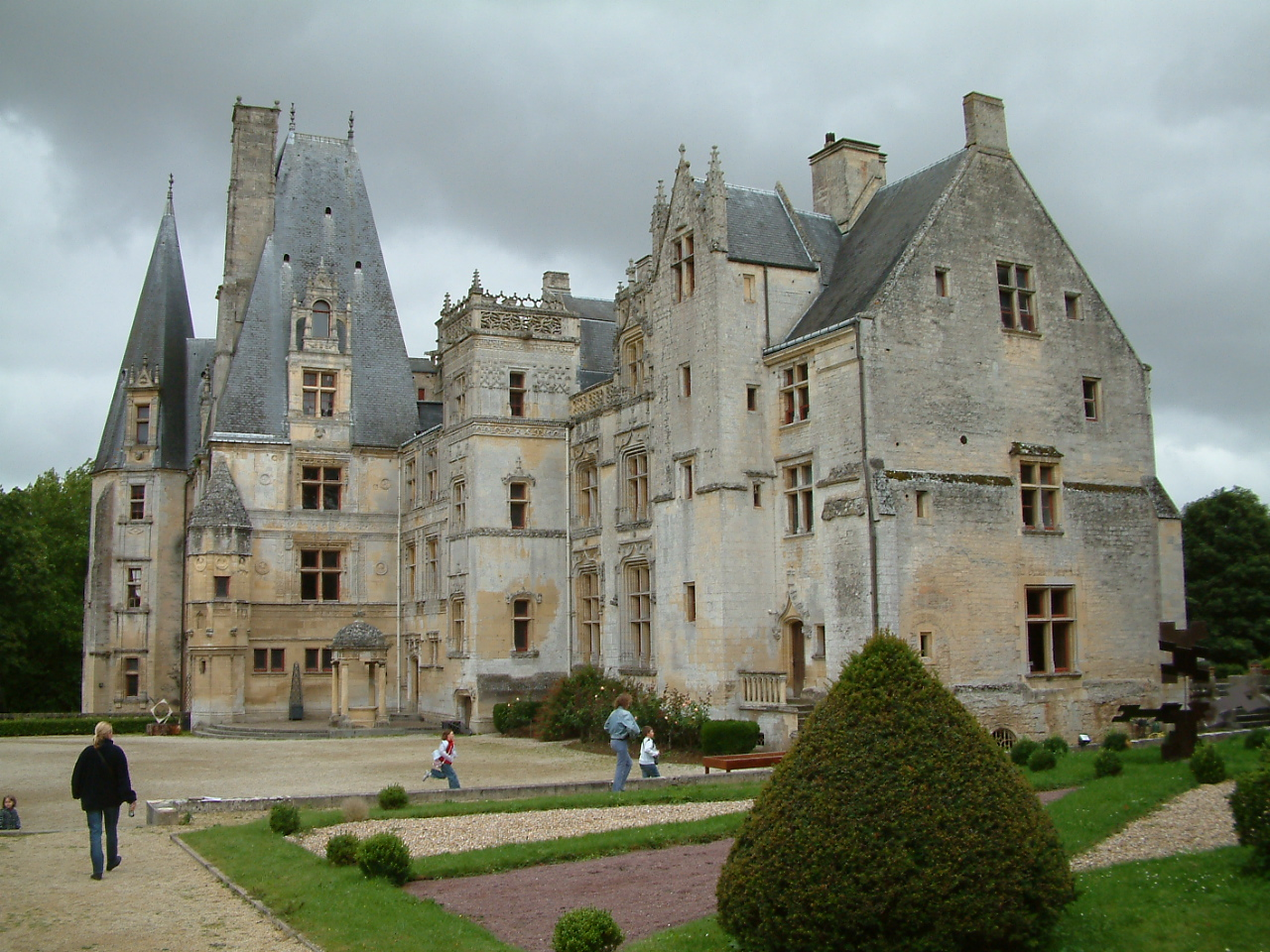
- The chateau of Fontaine-Henry

- Coat of arms
- Location of Fontaine-Henry
- Location within France Location within Normandy
- Coordinates: 49°16′40″N 0°27′15″W
- Country: France
- Region: Normandy
- Department: Calvados
- Arrondissement: Bayeux
- Canton: Thue et Mue
- Intercommunality: CC Seulles Terre Mer

Government
  - Mayor (2020–2026): Cyrille Rosello de Moliner
- Area^{1}: 5.81 km^{2} (2.24 sq mi)
- Elevation: 50 m (160 ft)
- Highest elevation: 58 m (190 ft)
- Lowest elevation: 7 m (23 ft)
- Population (2023): 528
  - Density: 90.9/km^{2} (235/sq mi)
- Time zone: UTC+01:00 (CET)
  - Summer (DST): UTC+02:00 (CEST)
- INSEE/Postal code: 14275 /14610
- ^{1} French Land Register data, which excludes lakes, ponds, glaciers > 1 km^{2} (0.386 sq mi or 247 acres) and river estuaries.

Fontaine-Henry (French pronunciation: [fɔ̃tɛn ɑ̃ʁi]) is a commune in the Calvados department in the Normandy region in northern France.

The commune is known for its chateau, rebuilt in the 15th and 16th centuries on the foundations of an earlier fortress built by Guillaume de Tilly, sieur de Fontaine-Henry, named in honour of his cousin Henry II of England. The château is still lived in by the descendants of its early owners, the comte and comtesse de Oilliamson.

== Population ==
Historical population
Year	Pop.	±% p.a.
1968	370	—
1975	364	−0.23%
1982	348	−0.64%
1990	448	+3.21%
1999	517	+1.60%
2007	480	−0.92%
2012	484	+0.17%
2017	466	−0.76%
2023	528	+2.10%
Source: INSEE

== See also ==
- Communes of the Calvados department
