= Bucéels =

- Commune
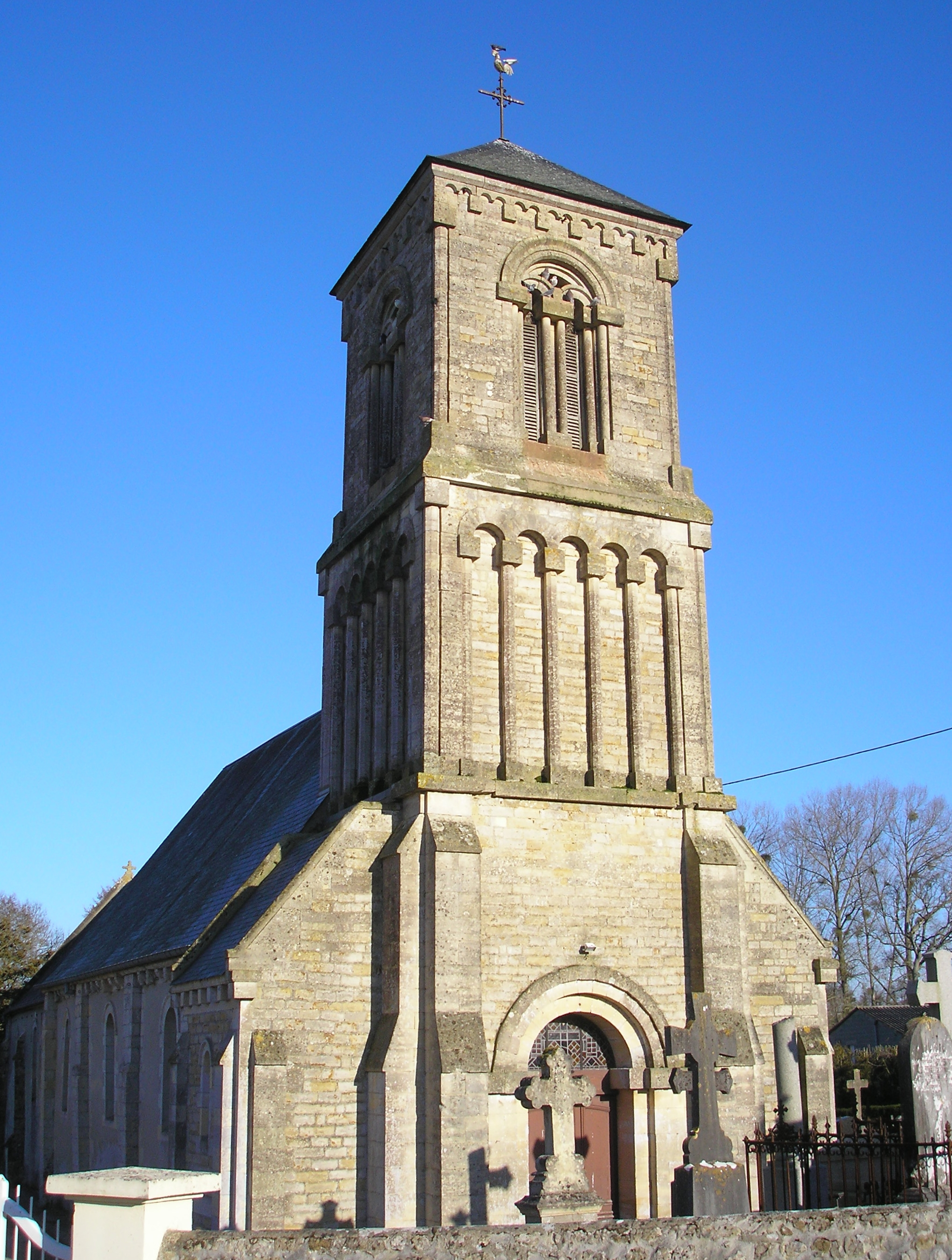
- The church in Bucéels
- Location of Bucéels
- Location within France Location within Normandy
- Coordinates: 49°11′32″N 0°38′22″W
- Country: France
- Region: Normandy
- Department: Calvados
- Arrondissement: Bayeux
- Canton: Thue et Mue
- Intercommunality: CC Seulles Terre Mer

Government
  - Mayor (2020–2026): Gwenaëlle Leconte
- Area^{1}: 4.84 km^{2} (1.87 sq mi)
- Elevation: 150 m (490 ft)
- Highest elevation: 96 m (315 ft)
- Lowest elevation: 42 m (138 ft)
- Population (2023): 456
  - Density: 94.2/km^{2} (244/sq mi)
- Time zone: UTC+01:00 (CET)
  - Summer (DST): UTC+02:00 (CEST)
- INSEE/Postal code: 14111 /14250
- ^{1} French Land Register data, which excludes lakes, ponds, glaciers > 1 km^{2} (0.386 sq mi or 247 acres) and river estuaries.

Bucéels (French pronunciation: [bysɛl]) is a commune in the Calvados department in the Normandy region in northwestern France.

== Population ==
Historical population
Year	Pop.	±% p.a.
1968	147	—
1975	151	+0.38%
1982	225	+5.86%
1990	357	+5.94%
1999	353	−0.13%
2007	390	+1.25%
2012	362	−1.48%
2017	397	+1.86%
2023	456	+2.34%
Source: INSEE

== See also ==
- Communes of the Calvados department
