= Loucelles =

- Commune
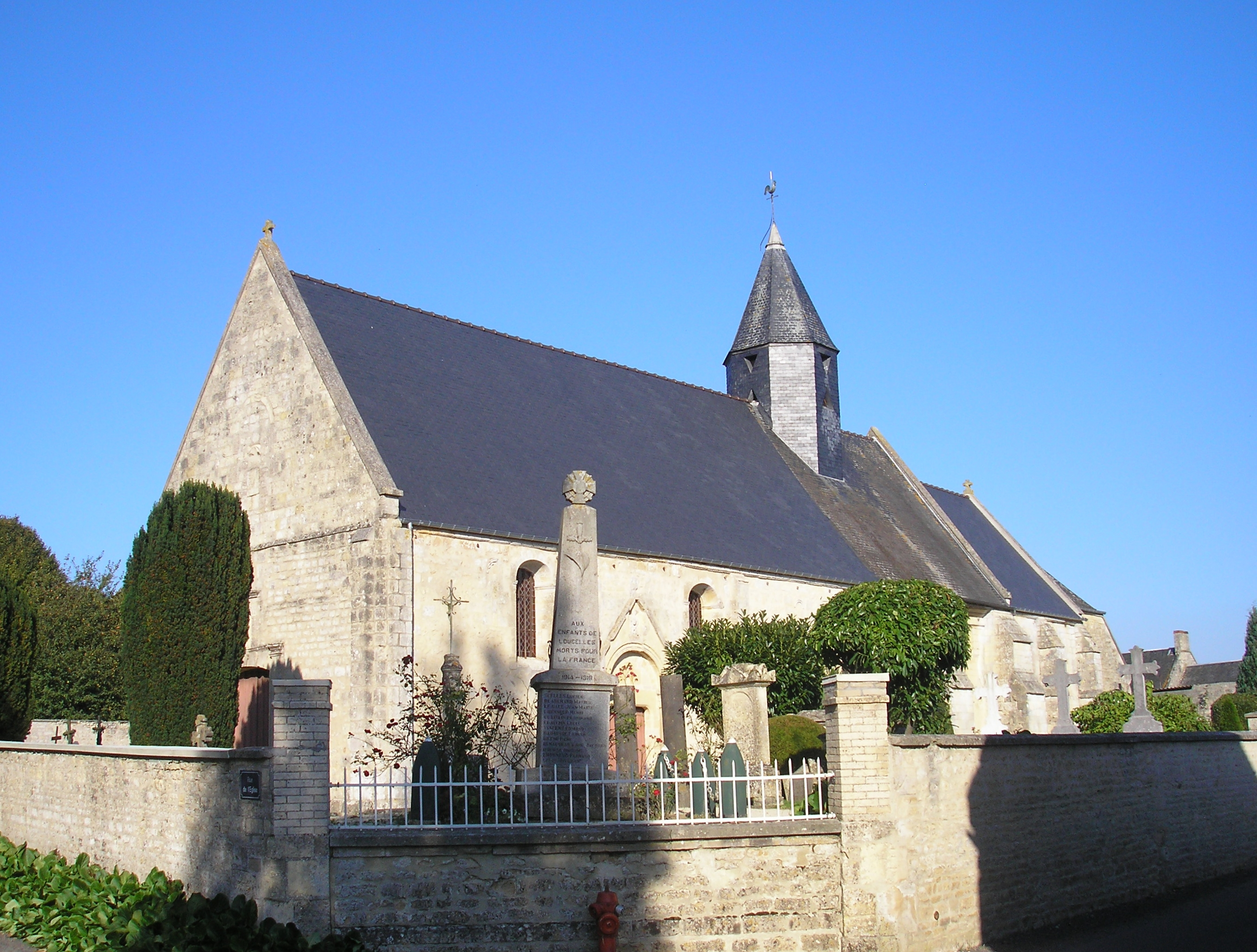
- The church in Loucelles
- Location of Loucelles
- Location within France Location within Normandy
- Coordinates: 49°13′28″N 0°34′49″W
- Country: France
- Region: Normandy
- Department: Calvados
- Arrondissement: Bayeux
- Canton: Thue et Mue
- Intercommunality: CC Seulles Terre Mer

Government
  - Mayor (2020–2026): Jean Duval
- Area^{1}: 3.07 km^{2} (1.19 sq mi)
- Highest elevation: 83 m (272 ft)
- Lowest elevation: 45 m (148 ft)
- Population (2023): 221
  - Density: 72.0/km^{2} (186/sq mi)
- Time zone: UTC+01:00 (CET)
  - Summer (DST): UTC+02:00 (CEST)
- INSEE/Postal code: 14380 /14250
- ^{1} French Land Register data, which excludes lakes, ponds, glaciers > 1 km^{2} (0.386 sq mi or 247 acres) and river estuaries.

Loucelles (French pronunciation: [lusɛl]) is a commune in the Calvados department in the Normandy region in northwestern France.

== Population ==
Historical population
Year	Pop.	±% p.a.
1968	116	—
1975	116	+0.00%
1982	123	+0.84%
1990	113	−1.05%
1999	137	+2.16%
2007	185	+3.83%
2012	190	+0.53%
2017	183	−0.75%
2023	221	+3.19%
Source: INSEE

== See also ==
- Communes of the Calvados department
