= Ducy-Sainte-Marguerite =

- Commune
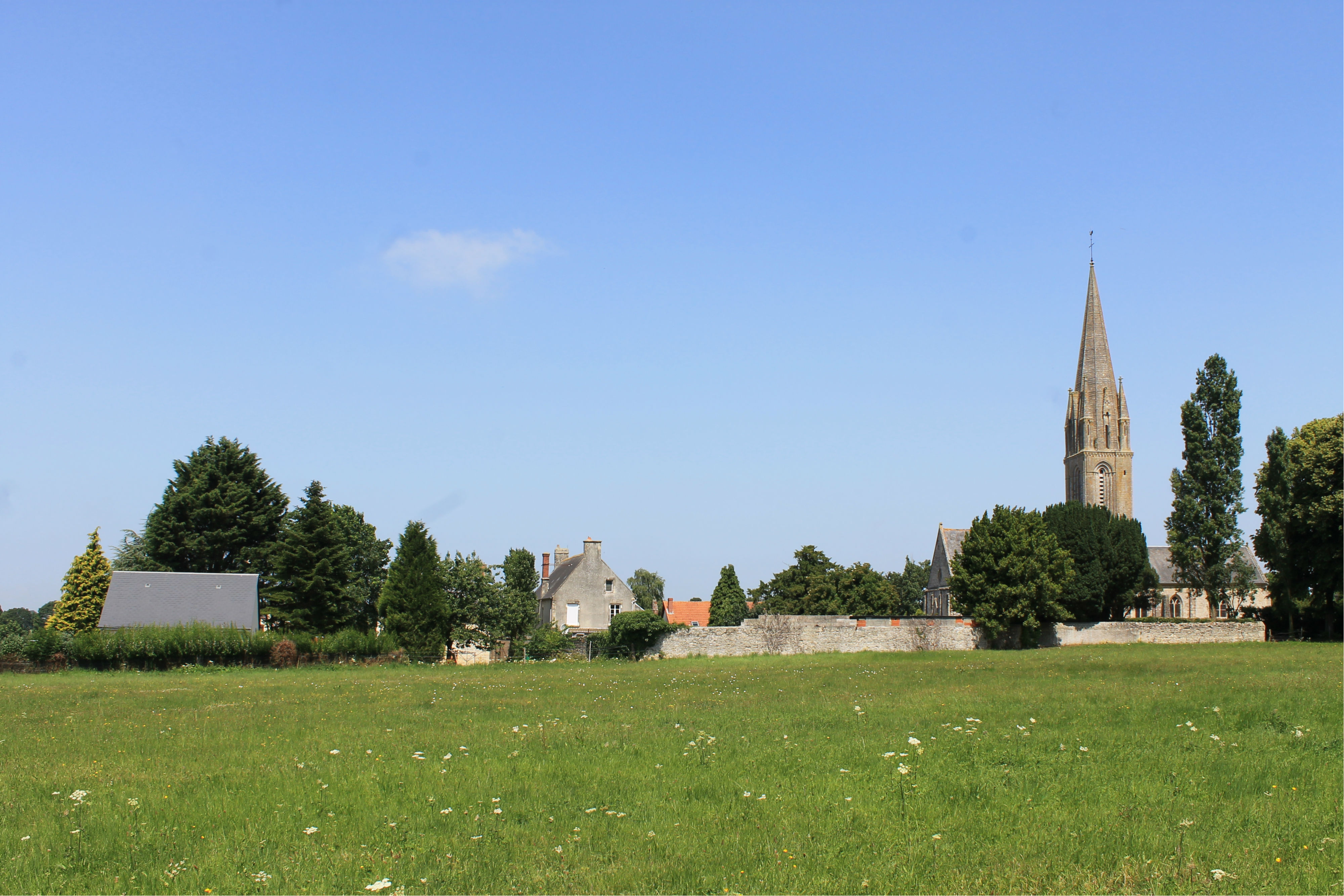
- A general view of Ducy-Sainte-Marguerite
- Location of Ducy-Sainte-Marguerite
- Location within France Location within Normandy
- Coordinates: 49°13′34″N 0°36′37″W
- Country: France
- Region: Normandy
- Department: Calvados
- Arrondissement: Bayeux
- Canton: Thue et Mue
- Intercommunality: CC Seulles Terre Mer

Government
  - Mayor (2020–2026): Daniel Lemoussu
- Area^{1}: 3.61 km^{2} (1.39 sq mi)
- Elevation: 80 m (260 ft)
- Highest elevation: 86 m (282 ft)
- Lowest elevation: 33 m (108 ft)
- Population (2023): 177
  - Density: 49.0/km^{2} (127/sq mi)
- Time zone: UTC+01:00 (CET)
  - Summer (DST): UTC+02:00 (CEST)
- INSEE/Postal code: 14232 /14250
- ^{1} French Land Register data, which excludes lakes, ponds, glaciers > 1 km^{2} (0.386 sq mi or 247 acres) and river estuaries.

Ducy-Sainte-Marguerite (French pronunciation: [dysi sɛ̃t maʁɡəʁit]) is a commune in the Calvados department in the Normandy region in northwestern France.

== Population ==
Historical population
Year	Pop.	±% p.a.
1968	166	—
1975	153	−1.16%
1982	148	−0.47%
1990	145	−0.26%
1999	144	−0.08%
2007	141	−0.26%
2012	138	−0.43%
2017	160	+3.00%
2023	177	+1.70%
Source: INSEE

== See also ==
- Communes of the Calvados department
