= Chouain =

- Commune
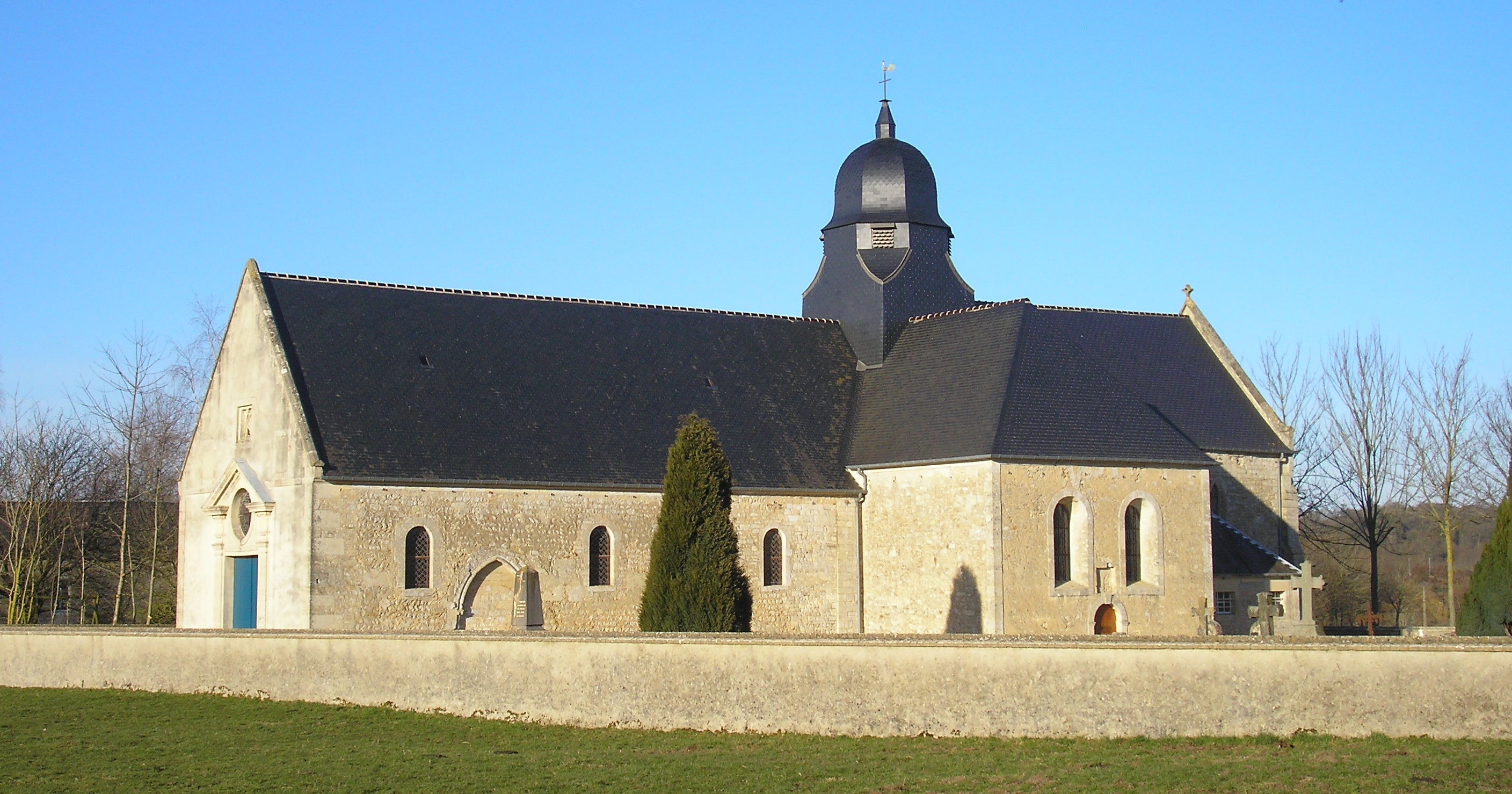
- The church in Chouain
- Location of Chouain
- Location within France Location within Normandy
- Coordinates: 49°12′41″N 0°37′59″W
- Country: France
- Region: Normandy
- Department: Calvados
- Arrondissement: Bayeux
- Canton: Bayeux
- Intercommunality: CC Bayeux Intercom

Government
  - Mayor (2020–2026): Gérard Ichmoukametoff
- Area^{1}: 3.15 km^{2} (1.22 sq mi)
- Elevation: 65 m (213 ft)
- Highest elevation: 86 m (282 ft)
- Lowest elevation: 37 m (121 ft)
- Population (2023): 229
  - Density: 72.7/km^{2} (188/sq mi)
- Time zone: UTC+01:00 (CET)
  - Summer (DST): UTC+02:00 (CEST)
- INSEE/Postal code: 14159 /14250
- ^{1} French Land Register data, which excludes lakes, ponds, glaciers > 1 km^{2} (0.386 sq mi or 247 acres) and river estuaries.

Chouain (French pronunciation: [ʃwɛ̃]) is a commune in the Calvados department in the Normandy region in northwestern France.

== Population ==
Historical population
Year	Pop.	±% p.a.
1968	135	—
1975	151	+1.61%
1982	170	+1.71%
1990	205	+2.37%
1999	188	−0.96%
2007	219	+1.93%
2012	212	−0.65%
2017	224	+1.11%
2023	229	+0.37%
Source: INSEE

== See also ==
- Communes of the Calvados department
