= Tilly-sur-Seulles =

- Commune
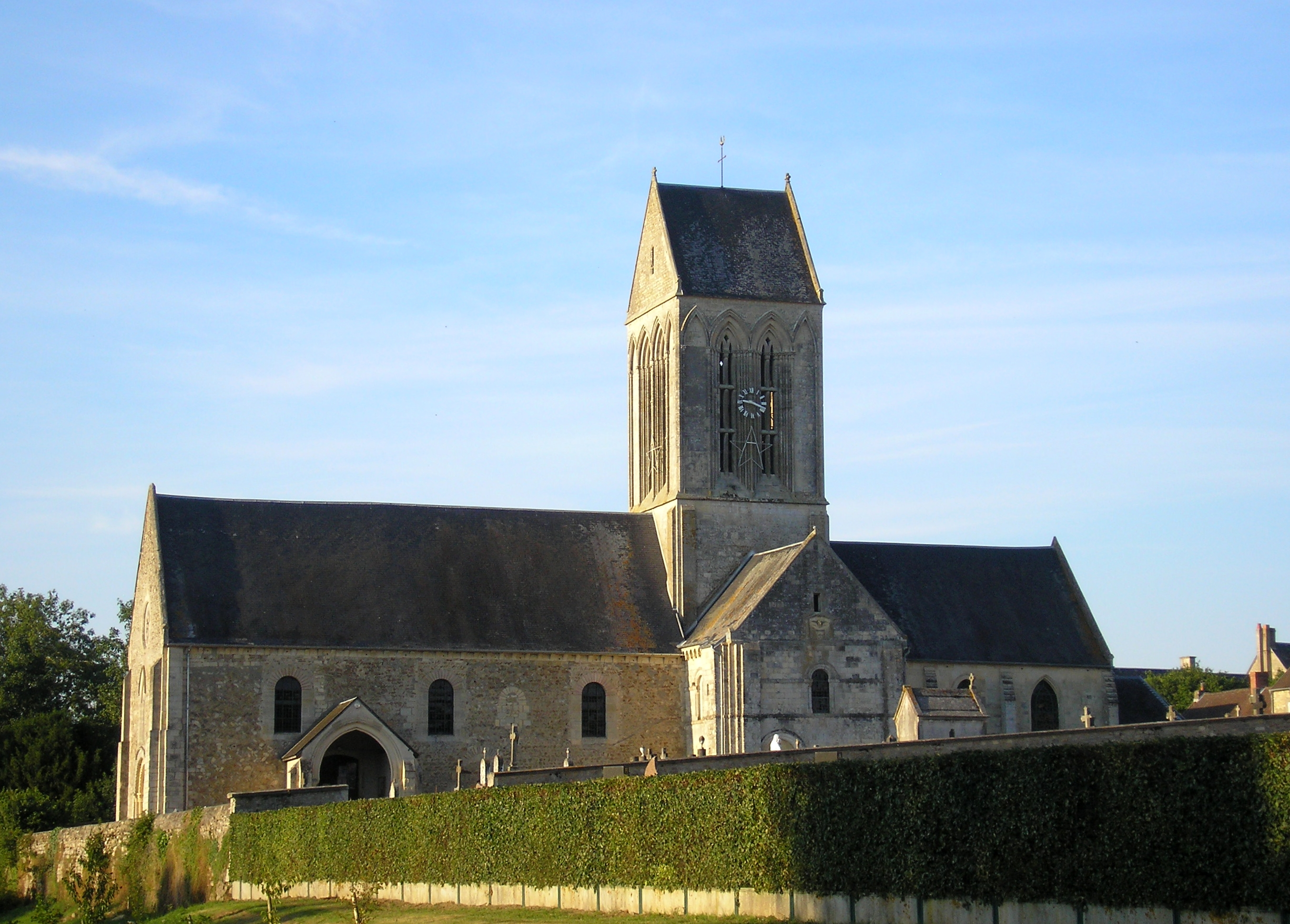
- The church in Tilly-sur-Seulles

- Coat of arms
- Location of Tilly-sur-Seulles
- Location within France Location within Normandy
- Coordinates: 49°10′34″N 0°37′31″W
- Country: France
- Region: Normandy
- Department: Calvados
- Arrondissement: Bayeux
- Canton: Thue et Mue
- Intercommunality: CC Seulles Terre Mer

Government
  - Mayor (2020–2026): Didier Couillard
- Area^{1}: 8.98 km^{2} (3.47 sq mi)
- Elevation: 75 m (246 ft)
- Highest elevation: 122 m (400 ft)
- Lowest elevation: 44 m (144 ft)
- Population (2023): 1,800
  - Density: 200/km^{2} (520/sq mi)
- Time zone: UTC+01:00 (CET)
  - Summer (DST): UTC+02:00 (CEST)
- INSEE/Postal code: 14692 /14250
- ^{1} French Land Register data, which excludes lakes, ponds, glaciers > 1 km^{2} (0.386 sq mi or 247 acres) and river estuaries.

Tilly-sur-Seulles (French pronunciation: [tiji syʁ sœl], literally Tilly on Seulles) is a commune in the Calvados department in the Normandy region in northwestern France.

== Population ==
Historical population
| Year | Pop. | ±% p.a. |
|---|---|---|
| 1968 | 973 | — |
| 1975 | 1,064 | +1.29% |
| 1982 | 1,092 | +0.37% |
| 1990 | 1,252 | +1.72% |
| 1999 | 1,251 | −0.01% |
| 2007 | 1,447 | +1.84% |
| 2012 | 1,519 | +0.98% |
| 2017 | 1,700 | +2.28% |
| 2023 | 1,800 | +0.96% |
Source: INSEE

== Points of Interest ==
=== Museums ===
- Musée de la Bataille de Tilly-sur-Seulles 1944 a Museum of France dedicated to the history of the village before and during the battle from 7 to 26 June 1944 between the 30th British Army Corps and the German troops during Operation Overlord.

=== National heritage sites ===
The Commune has 3 buildings and areas listed as a Monument historique.

- Église Saint Pierre de Tilly a twelfth-century church listed as a monument in 1927.
- Pont de Juvigny sur la Seulles a fifteenth-century stone bridge connecting the commune to the neighbouring commune of Juvigny-sur-Seulles, listed as a monument in 2006.
- Notre-Dame-du-Val chapel remains of the twelfth-century chapel, that was declared a monument in 1944.

== Events ==
Each year, the international motocross takes place.

Twinning with Horrabridge in Devon in the south of England.

== See also ==
- Communes of the Calvados department
- Operation Epsom
