= Communauté de communes Intercom Balleroy Le Molay-Littry =

Coordinates: 49.2422°N 0.8725°W

Intercom Balleroy Le Molay-Littry
- Former communauté de communes
- Interactive map of Intercom Balleroy Le Molay-Littry
- Country: France
- Region: Normandy
- Department: Calvados
- No. of communes: {{{nbcomm}}}
- Established: 1997
- Disbanded: 2017
- Area: 218.87 km^{2} (84.51 sq mi)
- Population (1999): 9,431
  - Density: 43.09/km^{2} (111.6/sq mi)

The Communauté de communes Intercom Balleroy Le Molay-Littry is a former communauté de communes in the Calvados department, in northern France. It was created in January 1997. It was merged into the new Communauté de communes Isigny-Omaha Intercom in January 2017.

The Communauté de communes comprised the following communes:

1. Balleroy-sur-Drôme
2. La Bazoque
3. Le Breuil-en-Bessin
4. Cahagnolles
5. Castillon
6. Cormolain
7. Foulognes
8. Litteau
9. Le Molay-Littry
10. Montfiquet
11. Noron-la-Poterie
12. Planquery
13. Sainte-Honorine-de-Ducy
14. Sainte-Marguerite-d'Elle
15. Saint-Paul-du-Vernay
16. Sallen
17. Saon
18. Saonnet
19. Tournières
20. Le Tronquay
21. Trungy
