= Canton of Isigny-sur-Mer =

Coordinates: 49°18′59″N 1°01′17″W

The canton of Isigny-sur-Mer is a former canton of the Calvados département in northwestern France. It had 10,172 inhabitants (2012). It was disbanded following the French canton reorganisation which came into effect in March 2015. It consisted of 24 communes, which joined the canton of Trévières in 2015. Its chief town was Isigny-sur-Mer.

The canton comprised the following communes:

- Asnières-en-Bessin
- La Cambe
- Canchy
- Cardonville
- Cartigny-l'Épinay
- Castilly
- Cricqueville-en-Bessin
- Deux-Jumeaux
- Englesqueville-la-Percée
- La Folie
- Géfosse-Fontenay
- Grandcamp-Maisy
- Isigny-sur-Mer
- Lison
- Longueville
- Monfréville
- Neuilly-la-Forêt
- Osmanville
- Les Oubeaux
- Saint-Germain-du-Pert
- Saint-Marcouf
- Sainte-Marguerite-d'Elle
- Saint-Pierre-du-Mont
- Vouilly
