= Canton of Balleroy =

Coordinates: 49°12′04″N 0°47′17″W

The canton of Balleroy is a former canton of the Calvados département in northwestern France. It had 10,905 inhabitants (2012). It was disbanded following the French canton reorganisation which came into effect in March 2015. Its chief town was Balleroy.

The canton comprised 22 communes:

- Balleroy
- La Bazoque
- Bucéels
- Cahagnolles
- Campigny
- Castillon
- Chouain
- Condé-sur-Seulles
- Ellon
- Juaye-Mondaye
- Lingèvres
- Litteau
- Le Molay-Littry
- Montfiquet
- Noron-la-Poterie
- Planquery
- Saint-Martin-de-Blagny
- Saint-Paul-du-Vernay
- Tournières
- Le Tronquay
- Trungy
- Vaubadon
