= Canchy =

Canchy may refer to the following places in France:

- Canchy, Calvados, in the Calvados département
- Canchy, Somme, in the Somme département
