= Surrain =

- Commune
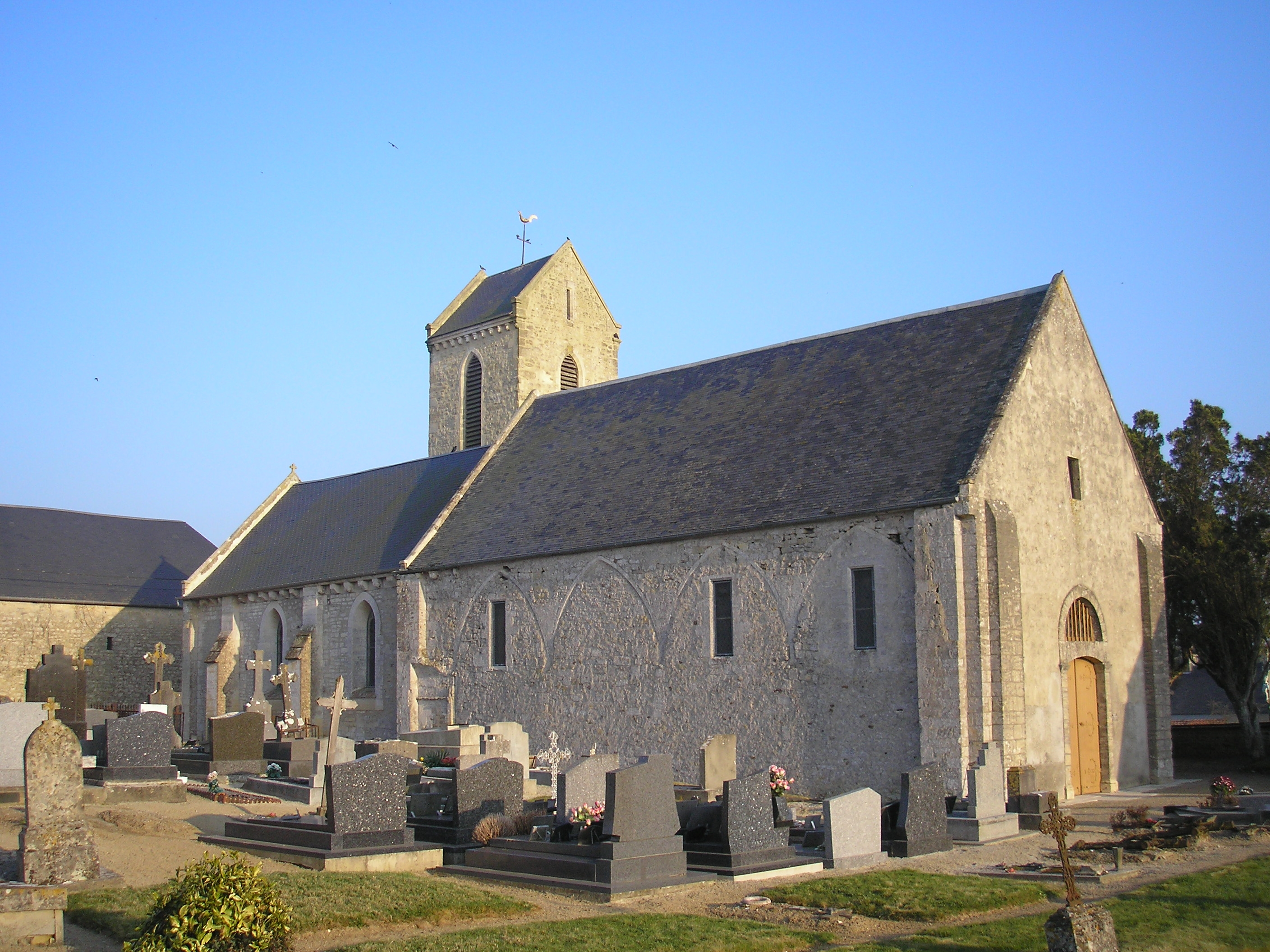
- The church in Surrain
- Location of Surrain
- Location within France Location within Normandy
- Coordinates: 49°19′41″N 0°51′45″W
- Country: France
- Region: Normandy
- Department: Calvados
- Arrondissement: Bayeux
- Canton: Trévières
- Intercommunality: CC Isigny-Omaha Intercom

Government
  - Mayor (2020–2026): Benoît Aimable
- Area^{1}: 7.08 km^{2} (2.73 sq mi)
- Elevation: 27 m (89 ft)
- Highest elevation: 79 m (259 ft)
- Lowest elevation: 5 m (16 ft)
- Population (2023): 138
  - Density: 19.5/km^{2} (50.5/sq mi)
- Time zone: UTC+01:00 (CET)
  - Summer (DST): UTC+02:00 (CEST)
- INSEE/Postal code: 14681 /14710
- ^{1} French Land Register data, which excludes lakes, ponds, glaciers > 1 km^{2} (0.386 sq mi or 247 acres) and river estuaries.

Surrain (French pronunciation: [syʁɛ̃]) is a commune in the Calvados department in the Normandy region in northwestern France.

== Population ==
Historical population
Year	Pop.	±% p.a.
1968	143	—
1975	121	−2.36%
1982	108	−1.61%
1990	123	+1.64%
1999	139	+1.37%
2007	152	+1.12%
2012	168	+2.02%
2017	158	−1.22%
2023	138	−2.23%
Source: INSEE

== See also ==
- Communes of the Calvados department
