= Saonnet =

- Commune
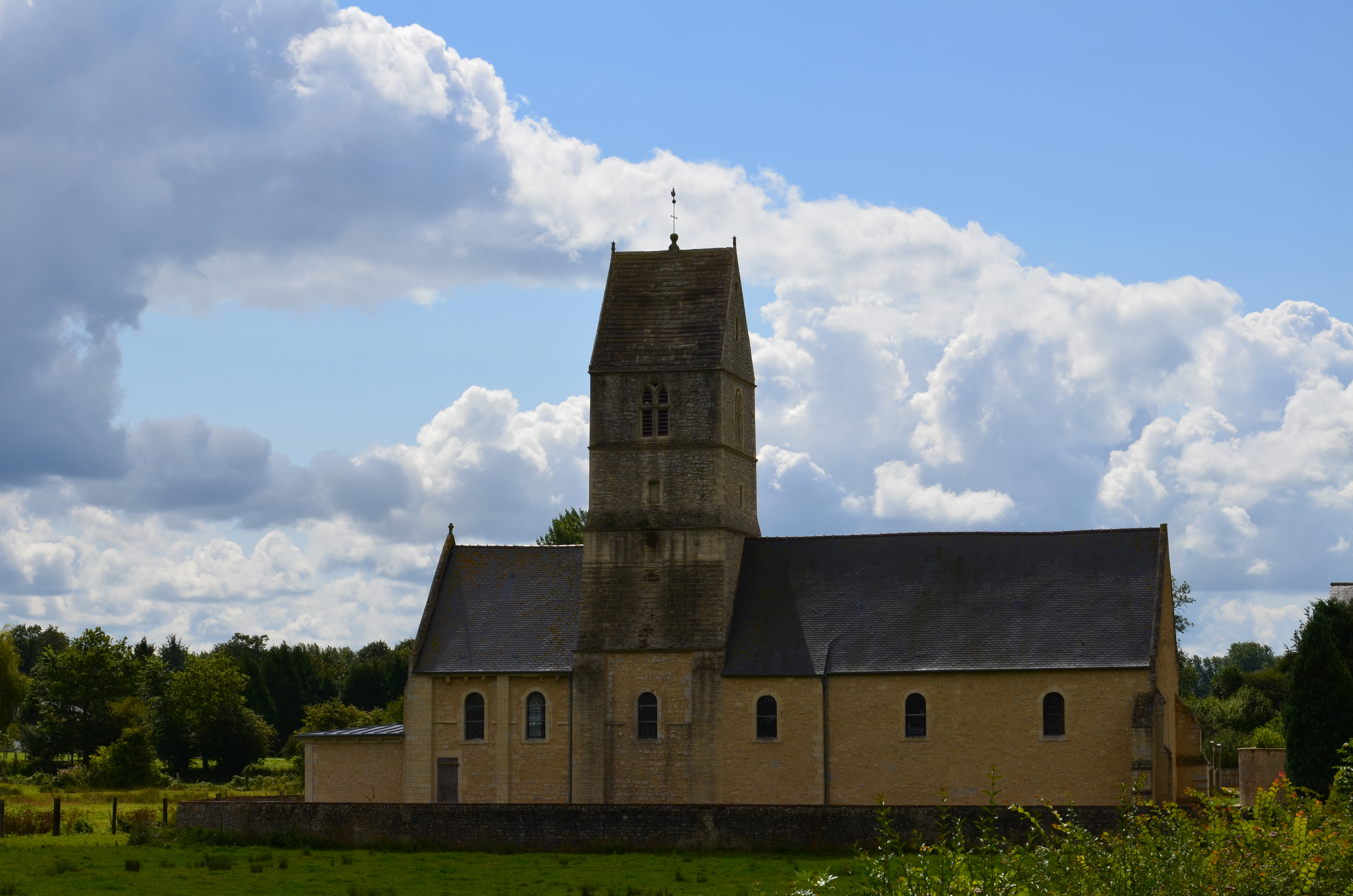
- The church in Saonnet
- Location of Saonnet
- Location within France Location within Normandy
- Coordinates: 49°16′26″N 0°52′41″W
- Country: France
- Region: Normandy
- Department: Calvados
- Arrondissement: Bayeux
- Canton: Trévières
- Intercommunality: CC Isigny-Omaha Intercom

Government
  - Mayor (2020–2026): Pierre Sebert
- Area^{1}: 5.34 km^{2} (2.06 sq mi)
- Elevation: 100 m (330 ft)
- Highest elevation: 75 m (246 ft)
- Lowest elevation: 5 m (16 ft)
- Population (2023): 325
  - Density: 60.9/km^{2} (158/sq mi)
- Time zone: UTC+01:00 (CET)
  - Summer (DST): UTC+02:00 (CEST)
- INSEE/Postal code: 14668 /14330
- ^{1} French Land Register data, which excludes lakes, ponds, glaciers > 1 km^{2} (0.386 sq mi or 247 acres) and river estuaries.

Saonnet (French pronunciation: [sɔnɛ]) is a commune in the Calvados department in the Normandy region in northwestern France.

== Toponymy ==
The locality was successively called Saunnet in 1254, Soanetum in 1284, then Saonet in the 15th century. Same definition as for Saon with the diminutive French suffix et.

== History ==
The Littry coal mines operated several mine shafts in the town between the end of the 18th century and the middle of the 19th century.

During the Battle of Normandy, the Allies built an airfield here.

== Geography ==
Saonnet is located thirteen kilometers west of Bayeux, in the regional natural park of the Marais du Cotentin et du Bessin. It is crossed by the river Tortonne.

=== Climate ===
The climate that characterizes the town is qualified, in 2010, as "french oceanic climate", according to the typology of the climates of France which then had eight major types of climates in mainland France. In 2020, the town comes out of the "ocean climate" type in the classification established by Météo-France, which now only counts, at first glance, five main types of climates in mainland France. This type of climate results in mild temperatures and relatively abundant rainfall (in connection with the disturbances coming from the Atlantic), distributed throughout the year with a slight maximum from October to February.

The climatic parameters that made it possible to establish the 2010 typology include six variables for temperature and eight for precipitation, whose values correspond to the 1971-2000 normal. The seven main variables characterizing the municipality are presented in the box below.

Communal climatic parameters over the period 1971-20001

- Average annual temperature: 10.8 °C
- Number of days with temperature below −5 °C: 1,7 j
- Number of days with temperature above 30 °C: 0,7 j
- Annual thermal amplitude: (Note: The annual thermal amplitude measures the difference between the average temperature of July and that of January. This variable is generally recognized as a criterion for discriminating between oceanic and continental climates.) 11.4 °C
- Annual total precipitation: 795 mm
- Number of days of precipitation in January: 13,4 j
- Number of days of precipitation in July: 8 j

With climate change, these variables have evolved. A study carried out in 2015 by the Directorate General for Energy and Climate supplemented by regional studies predicts that the average temperature should increase and the average rainfall decrease, with, however, strong regional variations. These changes can be seen on the nearest Météo-France meteorological station, in the town of Balleroy-sur-Drôme, commissioned in 2007 and which is 11 km away as the crow flies where the average annual temperature is 11.2 °C and the amount of precipitation is 927.2 mm for the period 1981–20109. On the nearest historical meteorological station, in the town of Carpiquet, commissioned in 1945 and 33 km away, the average annual temperature changes from 10.9 °C for the period 1971–2000 to 11.2 °C for 1981–2010, then 11.5 °C for 1991–2020.

== Town Plan ==
=== Typology ===
Saonnet is a rural town. It indeed one of the municipalities with little or very little density, within the meaning of the municipal density grid of INSEE.

In addition, the town is part of the Bayeux catchment area, of which it is a town. This area, which includes 29 towns, is categorized as an area with fewer than 50,000 inhabitants.

=== Land Usage ===
The land cover of the municipality, as it appears from the European biophysical land cover database Corine Land Cover (CLC), is marked by the importance of agricultural land (100% in 2018), a proportion identical to that of 1990 (100%). The detailed breakdown in 2018 is as follows: Grassland (67.5%), Arable land (20.8%), heterogeneous agricultural areas (11.7%).

The Institut national de l'information géographique et forestière (IGN) also provides an online tool to compare the evolution over time of land use in the municipality (or territories at different scales). Several periods are accessible in the form of maps or aerial photos: the Cassini map (18th century), the general staff map (1820–1866) and the current period (1950 to today).

== Administration ==
List of mayors
Period		Name	Political Party	Qualification
1996	-	Pierre Sébert	The Republicans	Farmer

== Demographics ==
Historical population
Year	Pop.	±% p.a.
1968	167	—
1975	165	−0.17%
1982	155	−0.89%
1990	177	+1.67%
1999	169	−0.51%
2007	205	+2.44%
2012	274	+5.97%
2017	305	+2.17%
2023	325	+1.06%
Source: INSEE

== Places and monuments ==
- Château de Berné and its dovecote (1776) listed as a historic monument.
- Château de la Mazinière, from the 17th century.
- A 12th century church.
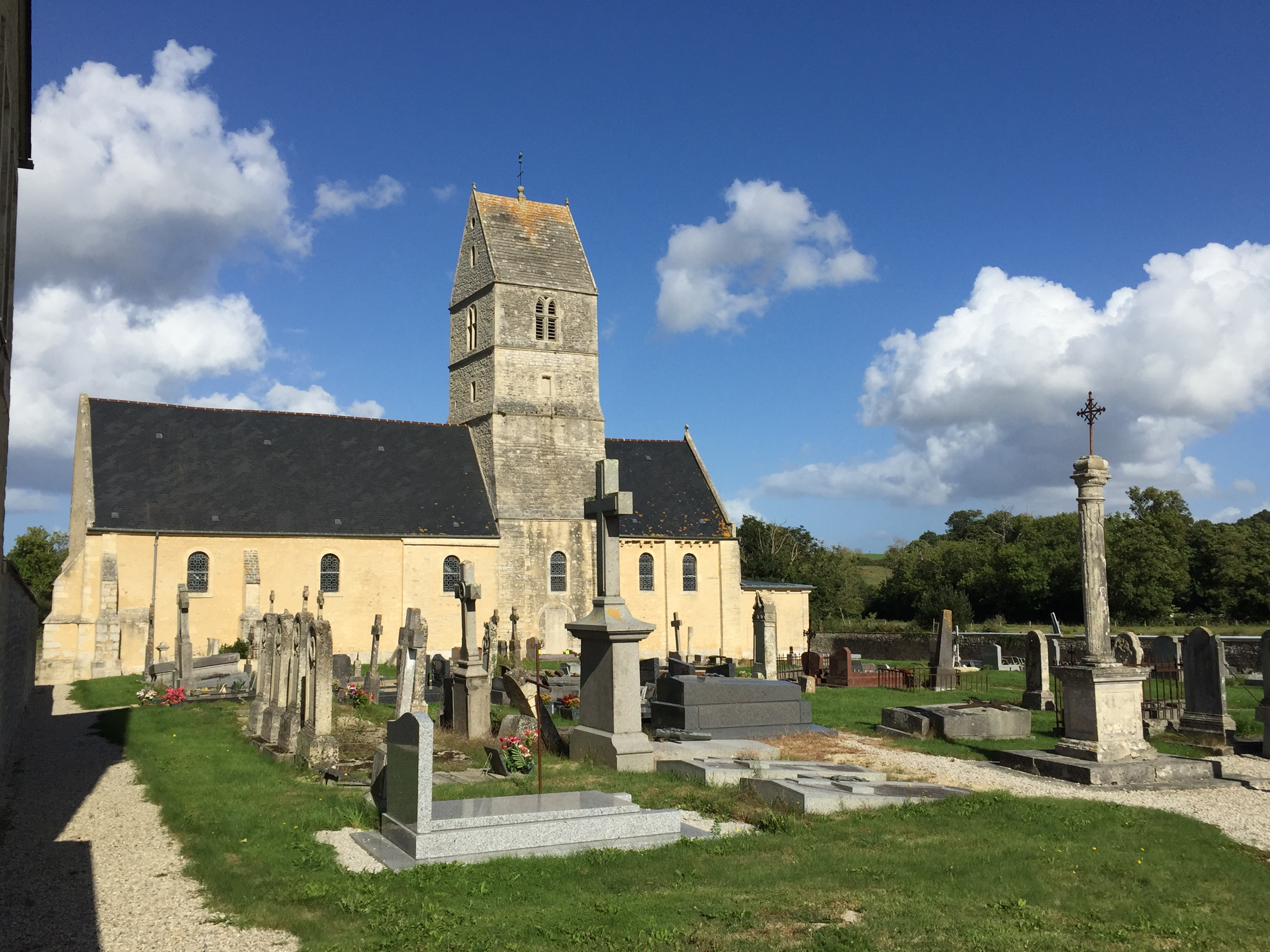
The church and its cemetery.

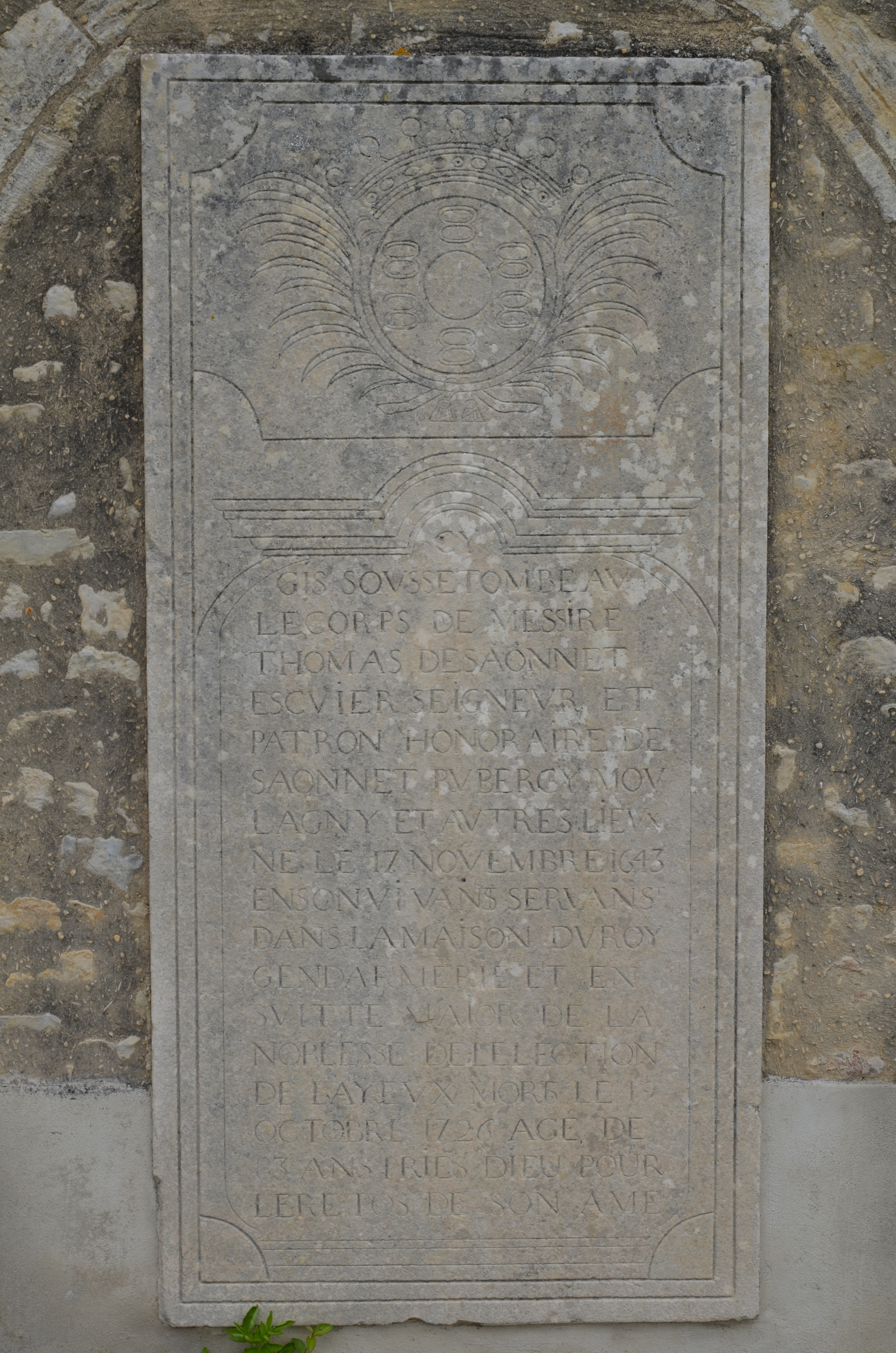
The tomb of Thomas de Saonnet.

== See also ==
- Communes of the Calvados department
