= Rubercy =

- Commune
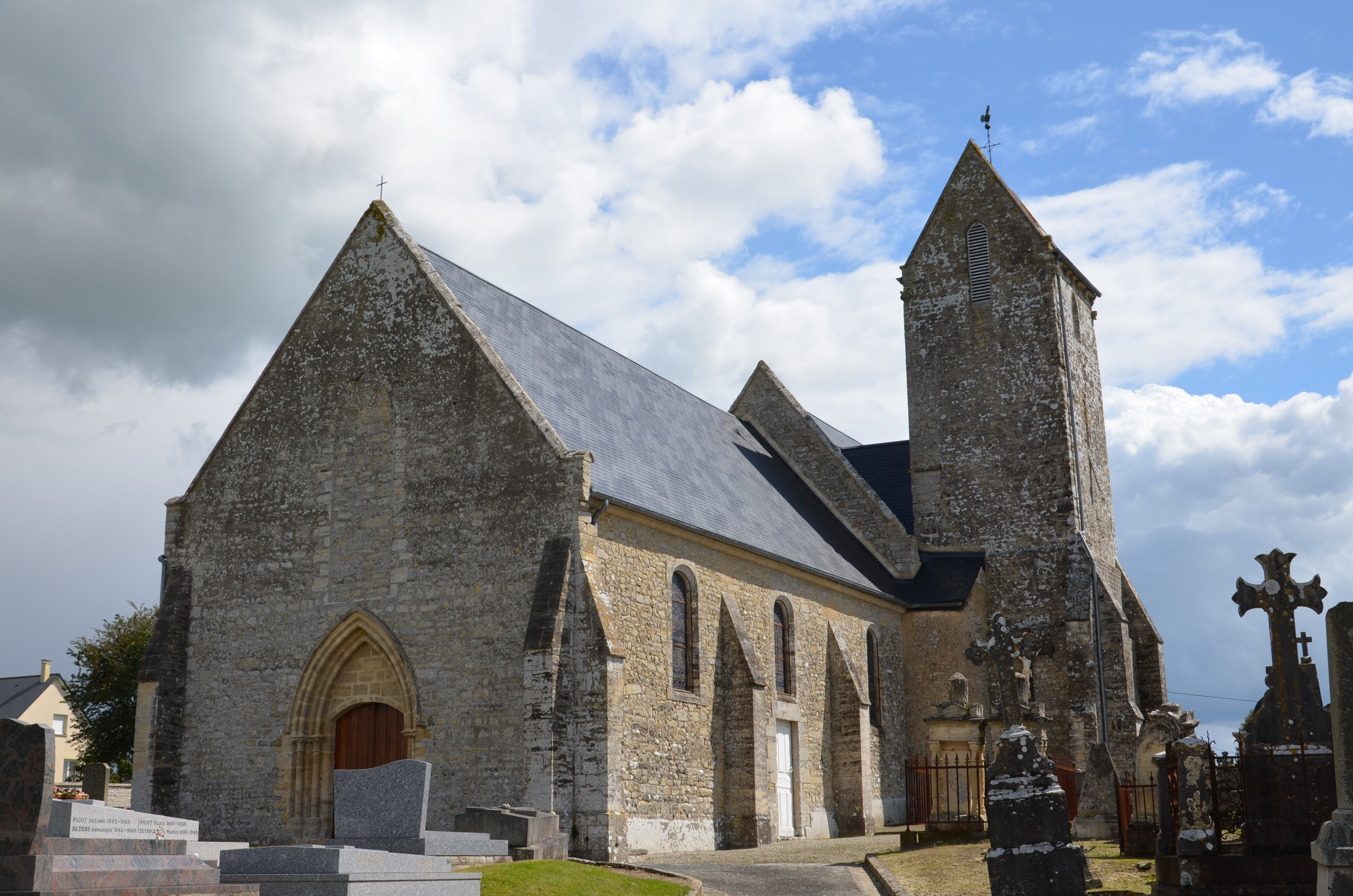
- The church in Rubercy
- Location of Rubercy
- Location within France Location within Normandy
- Coordinates: 49°17′03″N 0°52′41″W
- Country: France
- Region: Normandy
- Department: Calvados
- Arrondissement: Bayeux
- Canton: Trévières
- Intercommunality: CC Isigny-Omaha Intercom

Government
  - Mayor (2020–2026): Michel Mariette
- Area^{1}: 5.54 km^{2} (2.14 sq mi)
- Elevation: 9 m (30 ft)
- Highest elevation: 74 m (243 ft)
- Lowest elevation: 5 m (16 ft)
- Population (2023): 152
  - Density: 27.4/km^{2} (71.1/sq mi)
- Time zone: UTC+01:00 (CET)
  - Summer (DST): UTC+02:00 (CEST)
- INSEE/Postal code: 14547 /14710
- ^{1} French Land Register data, which excludes lakes, ponds, glaciers > 1 km^{2} (0.386 sq mi or 247 acres) and river estuaries.

Rubercy (French pronunciation: [ʁybɛʁsi]) is a commune in the Calvados department in the Normandy region in northwestern France.

== Population ==
Historical population
| Year | Pop. | ±% p.a. |
|---|---|---|
| 1968 | 110 | — |
| 1975 | 91 | −2.67% |
| 1982 | 89 | −0.32% |
| 1990 | 88 | −0.14% |
| 1999 | 93 | +0.62% |
| 2007 | 109 | +2.00% |
| 2012 | 139 | +4.98% |
| 2017 | 171 | +4.23% |
| 2023 | 152 | −1.94% |
Source: INSEE

== See also ==
- Communes of the Calvados department
