= Mandeville-en-Bessin =

- Commune
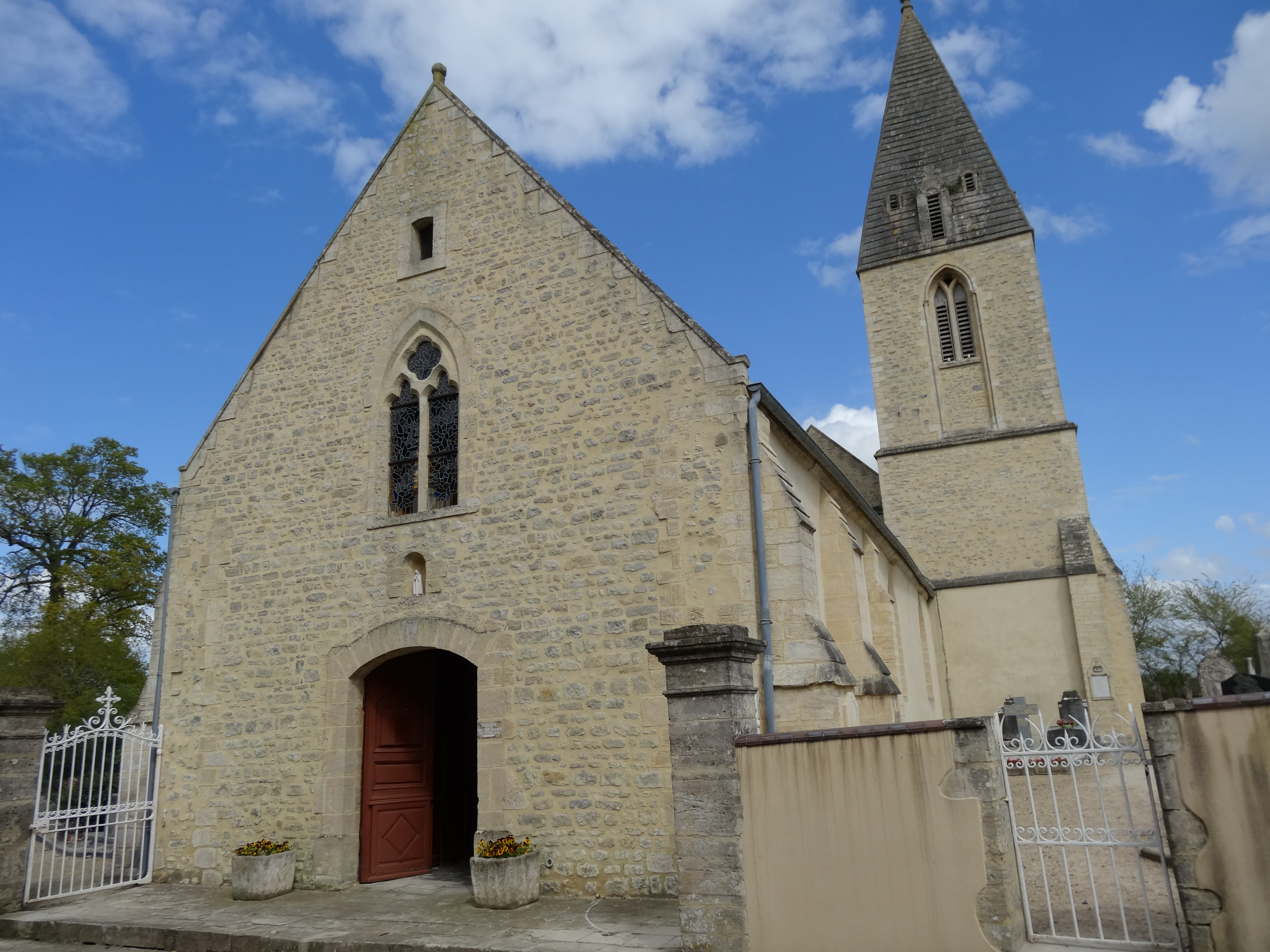
- The church in Mandeville-en-Bessin
- Location of Mandeville-en-Bessin
- Location within France Location within Normandy
- Coordinates: 49°18′08″N 0°52′38″W
- Country: France
- Region: Normandy
- Department: Calvados
- Arrondissement: Bayeux
- Canton: Trévières
- Intercommunality: CC Isigny-Omaha Intercom

Government
  - Mayor (2020–2026): Pierre Lefèvre
- Area^{1}: 8.83 km^{2} (3.41 sq mi)
- Elevation: 50 m (160 ft)
- Highest elevation: 68 m (223 ft)
- Lowest elevation: 4 m (13 ft)
- Population (2023): 303
  - Density: 34.3/km^{2} (88.9/sq mi)
- Time zone: UTC+01:00 (CET)
  - Summer (DST): UTC+02:00 (CEST)
- INSEE/Postal code: 14397 /14710
- ^{1} French Land Register data, which excludes lakes, ponds, glaciers > 1 km^{2} (0.386 sq mi or 247 acres) and river estuaries.

Mandeville-en-Bessin (French pronunciation: [mɑ̃dvil ɑ̃ bɛsɛ̃]) is a commune in the Calvados department in the Normandy region in northwestern France.

== Population ==
Historical population
Year	Pop.	±% p.a.
1968	368	—
1975	332	−1.46%
1982	305	−1.20%
1990	262	−1.88%
1999	229	−1.48%
2007	280	+2.55%
2012	365	+5.45%
2017	336	−1.64%
2023	303	−1.71%
Source: INSEE

== See also ==
- Communes of the Calvados department
