= Mosles =

- Commune
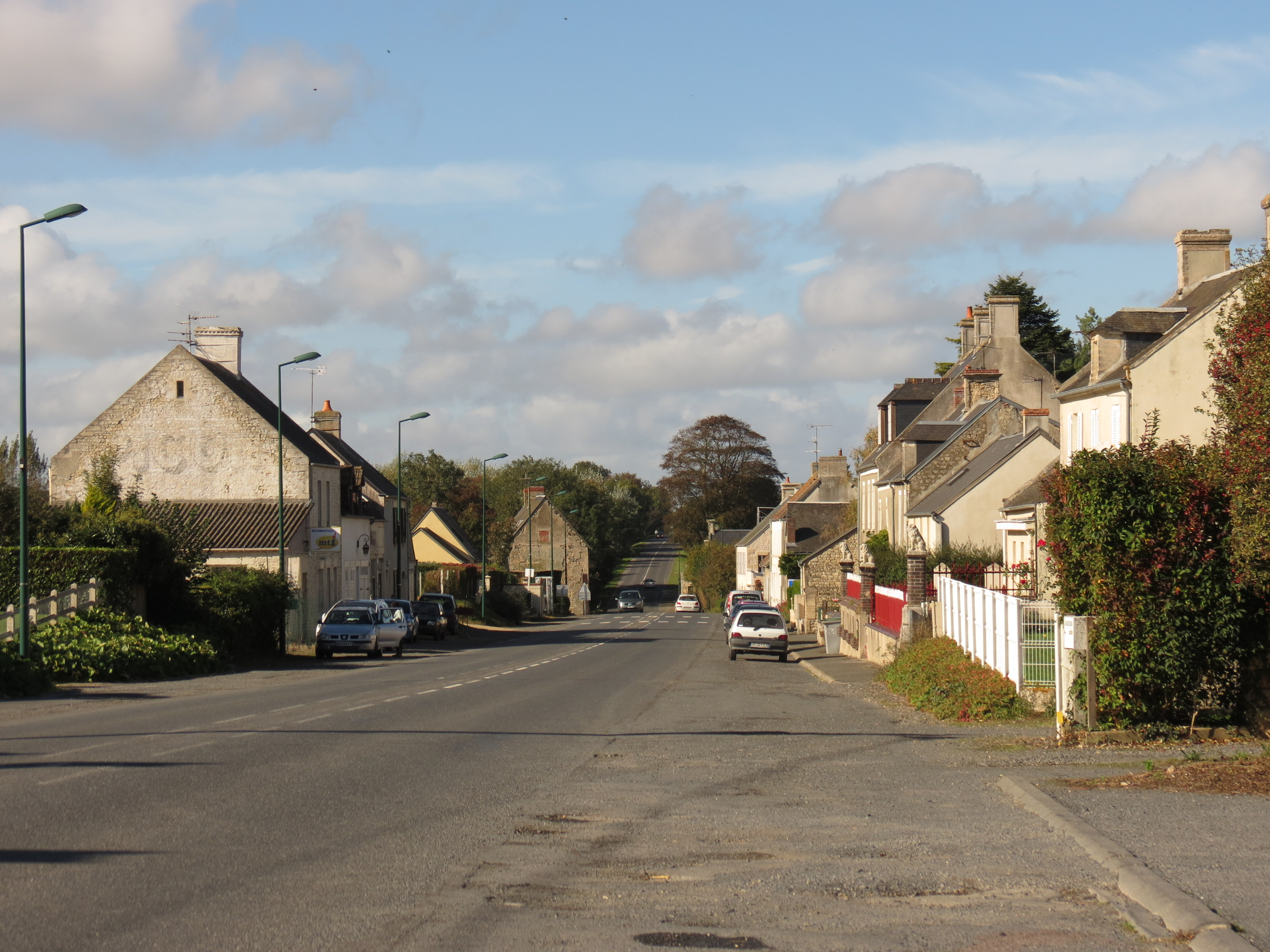
- The main road in Mosles
- Location of Mosles
- Location within France Location within Normandy
- Coordinates: 49°18′37″N 0°49′06″W
- Country: France
- Region: Normandy
- Department: Calvados
- Arrondissement: Bayeux
- Canton: Trévières
- Intercommunality: CC Isigny-Omaha Intercom

Government
  - Mayor (2020–2026): David Pottier
- Area^{1}: 6.42 km^{2} (2.48 sq mi)
- Elevation: 31 m (102 ft)
- Highest elevation: 62 m (203 ft)
- Lowest elevation: 7 m (23 ft)
- Population (2023): 368
  - Density: 57.3/km^{2} (148/sq mi)
- Time zone: UTC+01:00 (CET)
  - Summer (DST): UTC+02:00 (CEST)
- INSEE/Postal code: 14453 /14400
- ^{1} French Land Register data, which excludes lakes, ponds, glaciers > 1 km^{2} (0.386 sq mi or 247 acres) and river estuaries.

Mosles (French pronunciation: [mol]) is a commune in the Calvados department in the Normandy region in northwestern France.

== Population ==
Historical population
Year	Pop.	±% p.a.
1968	275	—
1975	235	−2.22%
1982	247	+0.71%
1990	261	+0.69%
1999	253	−0.35%
2007	292	+1.81%
2012	385	+5.69%
2017	354	−1.66%
2023	368	+0.65%
Source: INSEE

== See also ==
- Communes of the Calvados department
