= Communauté de communes Isigny-Omaha Intercom =

Federation of municipalities in France

Isigny-Omaha Intercom
- Communauté de communes
- Interactive map of Isigny-Omaha Intercom
- Coordinates: 49°16′N 00°53′W
- Country: France
- Region: Normandy
- Department: Calvados
- No. of communes: {{{nbcomm}}}
- Established: 2017
- Area: 581.7 km^{2} (224.6 sq mi)
- Population (2019): 26,543
  - Density: 45.63/km^{2} (118.2/sq mi)
- Website: isigny-omaha-intercom.fr

The Communauté de communes Isigny-Omaha Intercom is a communauté de communes, an intercommunal structure, in the Calvados department, in the Normandy region, northwestern France. It was created in January 2017 by the merger of the former communautés de communes Intercom Balleroy Le Molay-Littry, Isigny Grandcamp Intercom and Trévières. Its area is 581.7 km^{2}, and its population was 26,543 in 2019. Its seat is in Le Molay-Littry.

== Communes ==
The communauté de communes consists of the following 59 communes:

1. Asnières-en-Bessin
2. Aure sur Mer
3. Balleroy-sur-Drôme
4. La Bazoque
5. Bernesq
6. Blay
7. Le Breuil-en-Bessin
8. Bricqueville
9. Cahagnolles
10. La Cambe
11. Canchy
12. Cardonville
13. Cartigny-l'Épinay
14. Castillon
15. Colleville-sur-Mer
16. Colombières
17. Cormolain
18. Cricqueville-en-Bessin
19. Crouay
20. Deux-Jumeaux
21. Englesqueville-la-Percée
22. Étréham
23. La Folie
24. Formigny La Bataille
25. Foulognes
26. Géfosse-Fontenay
27. Grandcamp-Maisy
28. Isigny-sur-Mer
29. Lison
30. Litteau
31. Longueville
32. Maisons
33. Mandeville-en-Bessin
34. Le Molay-Littry
35. Monfréville
36. Montfiquet
37. Mosles
38. Noron-la-Poterie
39. Osmanville
40. Planquery
41. Rubercy
42. Sainte-Honorine-de-Ducy
43. Sainte-Marguerite-d'Elle
44. Saint-Germain-du-Pert
45. Saint-Laurent-sur-Mer
46. Saint-Marcouf
47. Saint-Martin-de-Blagny
48. Saint-Paul-du-Vernay
49. Saint-Pierre-du-Mont
50. Sallen
51. Saon
52. Saonnet
53. Surrain
54. Tour-en-Bessin
55. Tournières
56. Trévières
57. Le Tronquay
58. Trungy
59. Vierville-sur-Mer
