= Bernesq =

- Commune
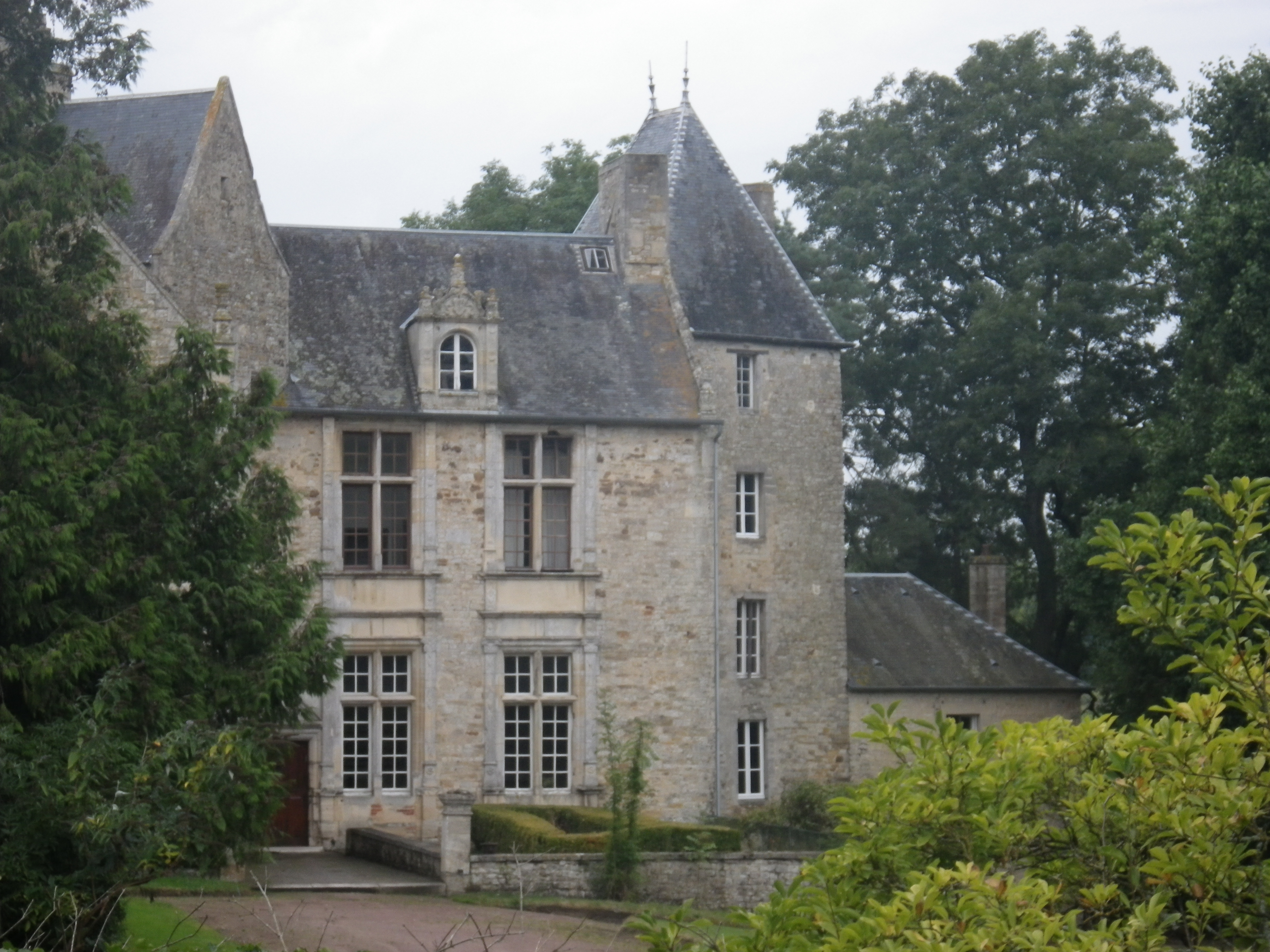
- The chateau in Bernesq
- Location of Bernesq
- Location within France Location within Normandy
- Coordinates: 49°16′26″N 0°56′25″W
- Country: France
- Region: Normandy
- Department: Calvados
- Arrondissement: Bayeux
- Canton: Trévières
- Intercommunality: CC Isigny-Omaha Intercom

Government
  - Mayor (2023–2026): Patrick Joannin
- Area^{1}: 5.9 km^{2} (2.3 sq mi)
- Elevation: 45 m (148 ft)
- Highest elevation: 62 m (203 ft)
- Lowest elevation: 6 m (20 ft)
- Population (2023): 212
  - Density: 36/km^{2} (93/sq mi)
- Time zone: UTC+01:00 (CET)
  - Summer (DST): UTC+02:00 (CEST)
- INSEE/Postal code: 14063 /14710
- ^{1} French Land Register data, which excludes lakes, ponds, glaciers > 1 km^{2} (0.386 sq mi or 247 acres) and river estuaries.

Bernesq (French pronunciation: [bɛʁnɛsk]) is a commune in the Calvados department in the Normandy region in northwestern France.

== Population ==
Historical population
Year	Pop.	±% p.a.
1968	301	—
1975	275	−1.28%
1982	207	−3.98%
1990	167	−2.65%
1999	153	−0.97%
2007	209	+3.98%
2012	183	−2.62%
2017	204	+2.20%
2023	212	+0.64%
Source: INSEE

== See also ==
- Communes of the Calvados department
