= Blay =

- Commune
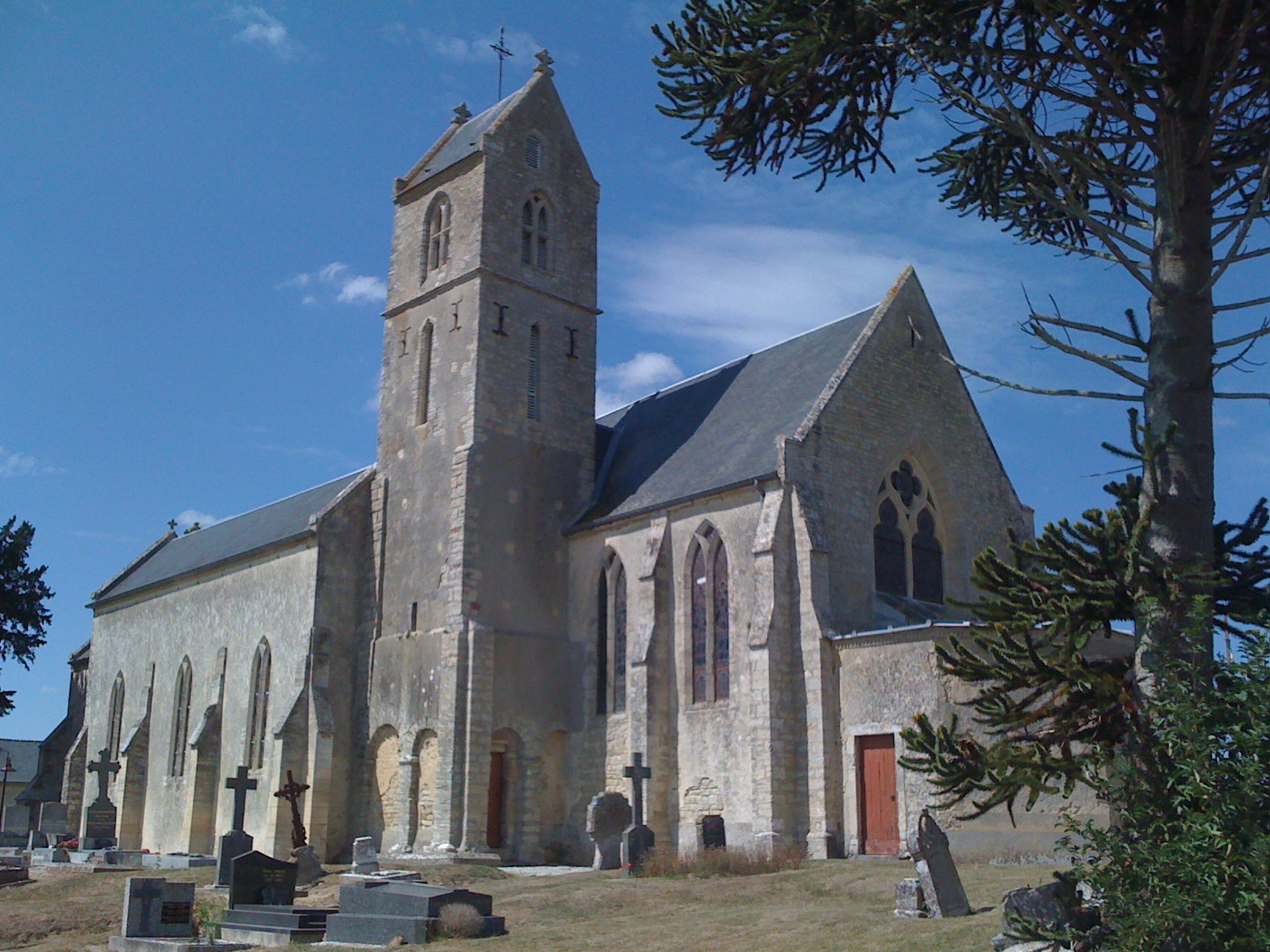
- St. Pierre
- Location of Blay
- Location within France Location within Normandy
- Coordinates: 49°16′14″N 0°50′22″W
- Country: France
- Region: Normandy
- Department: Calvados
- Arrondissement: Bayeux
- Canton: Trévières
- Intercommunality: CC Isigny-Omaha Intercom

Government
  - Mayor (2020–2026): Philippe Launay
- Area^{1}: 7.14 km^{2} (2.76 sq mi)
- Elevation: 20 m (66 ft)
- Highest elevation: 81 m (266 ft)
- Lowest elevation: 15 m (49 ft)
- Population (2023): 354
  - Density: 49.6/km^{2} (128/sq mi)
- Time zone: UTC+01:00 (CET)
  - Summer (DST): UTC+02:00 (CEST)
- INSEE/Postal code: 14078 /14400
- ^{1} French Land Register data, which excludes lakes, ponds, glaciers > 1 km^{2} (0.386 sq mi or 247 acres) and river estuaries.

Blay (French pronunciation: [blɛ]) is a commune in the Calvados department in the Normandy region in northwestern France.

== Population ==
Historical population
Year	Pop.	±% p.a.
1968	184	—
1975	217	+2.38%
1982	215	−0.13%
1990	239	+1.33%
1999	267	+1.24%
2007	312	+1.97%
2012	374	+3.69%
2017	383	+0.48%
2023	354	−1.30%
Source: INSEE

== See also ==
- Communes of the Calvados department
