= Géfosse-Fontenay =

- Commune
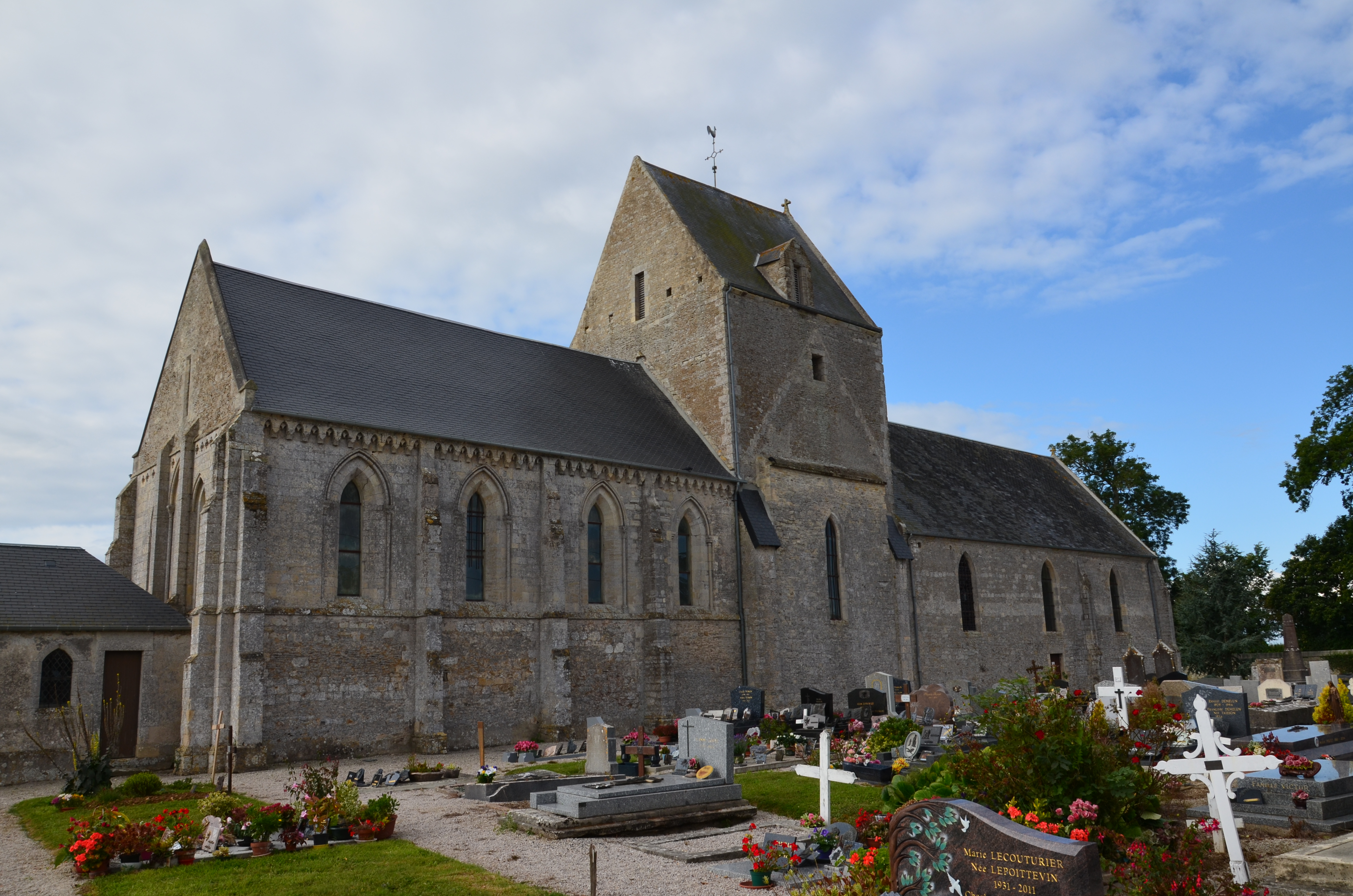
- The church in Géfosse-Fontenay
- Location of Géfosse-Fontenay
- Location within France Location within Normandy
- Coordinates: 49°21′57″N 1°05′32″W
- Country: France
- Region: Normandy
- Department: Calvados
- Arrondissement: Bayeux
- Canton: Trévières
- Intercommunality: CC Isigny-Omaha Intercom

Government
  - Mayor (2020–2026): Brigitte Blestel
- Area^{1}: 11.11 km^{2} (4.29 sq mi)
- Elevation: 10 m (33 ft)
- Highest elevation: 32 m (105 ft)
- Lowest elevation: 0 m (0 ft)
- Population (2023): 129
  - Density: 11.6/km^{2} (30.1/sq mi)
- Time zone: UTC+01:00 (CET)
  - Summer (DST): UTC+02:00 (CEST)
- INSEE/Postal code: 14298 /14230
- ^{1} French Land Register data, which excludes lakes, ponds, glaciers > 1 km^{2} (0.386 sq mi or 247 acres) and river estuaries.

Géfosse-Fontenay (French pronunciation: [ʒefos fɔ̃tnɛ]) is a commune in the Calvados department in the Normandy region in northwestern France.

== Population ==
Historical population
Year	Pop.	±% p.a.
1968	196	—
1975	193	−0.22%
1982	161	−2.56%
1990	124	−3.21%
1999	111	−1.22%
2007	140	+2.94%
2012	131	−1.32%
2017	141	+1.48%
2023	129	−1.47%
Source: INSEE

== See also ==
- Communes of the Calvados department
