= Cormolain =

- Commune
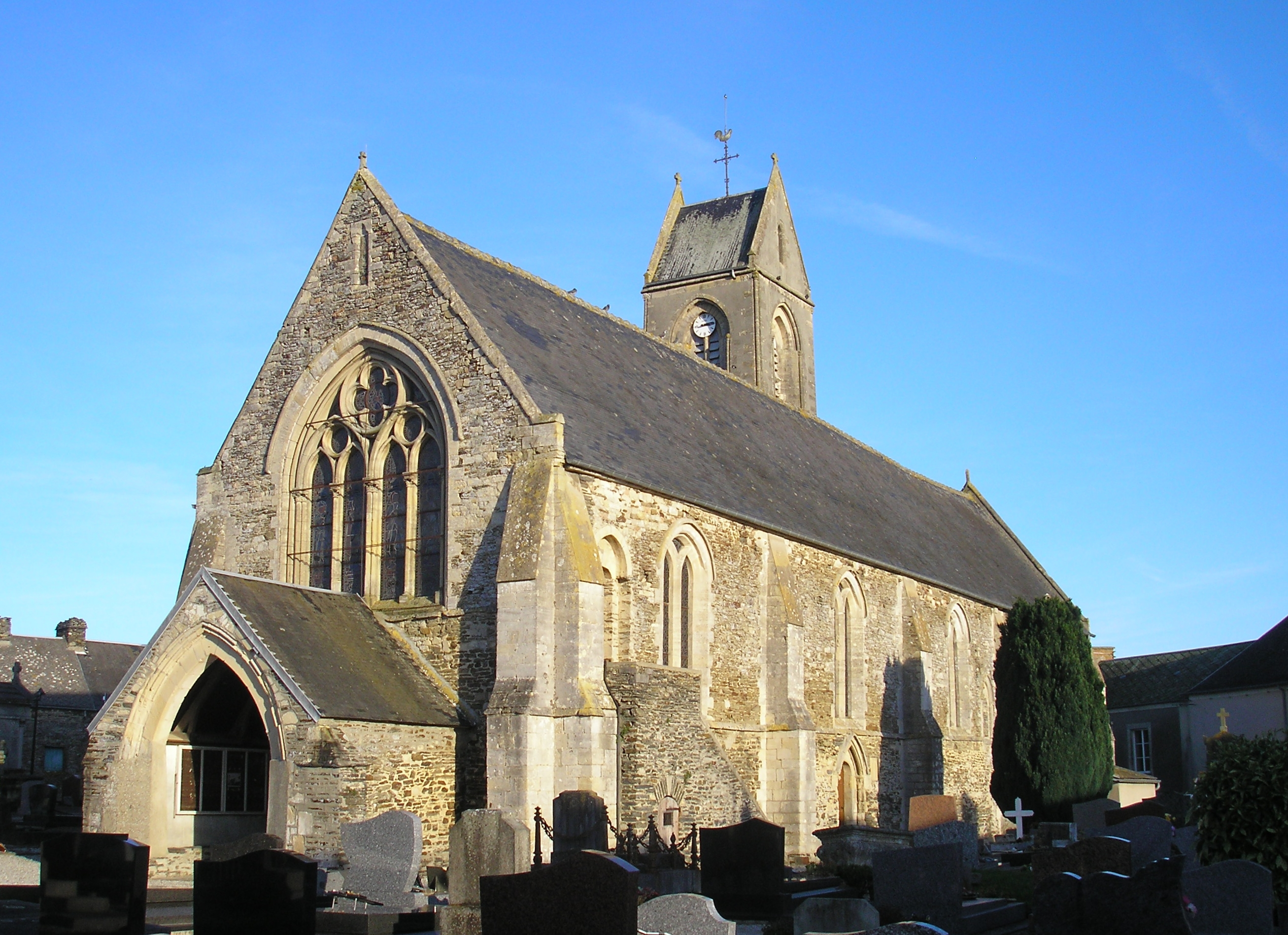
- The church in Cormolain

- Coat of arms
- Location of Cormolain
- Location within France Location within Normandy
- Coordinates: 49°07′51″N 0°51′16″W
- Country: France
- Region: Normandy
- Department: Calvados
- Arrondissement: Bayeux
- Canton: Trévières
- Intercommunality: CC Isigny-Omaha Intercom

Government
  - Mayor (2020–2026): Cédric Poisson
- Area^{1}: 11.04 km^{2} (4.26 sq mi)
- Elevation: 130 m (430 ft)
- Highest elevation: 180 m (590 ft)
- Lowest elevation: 68 m (223 ft)
- Population (2023): 392
  - Density: 35.5/km^{2} (92.0/sq mi)
- Time zone: UTC+01:00 (CET)
  - Summer (DST): UTC+02:00 (CEST)
- INSEE/Postal code: 14182 /14240
- ^{1} French Land Register data, which excludes lakes, ponds, glaciers > 1 km^{2} (0.386 sq mi or 247 acres) and river estuaries.

Cormolain (French pronunciation: [kɔʁmɔlɛ̃]) is a commune in the Calvados department in the Normandy region in northwestern France.

Edward III camped with his army in Cormolain overnight on 23 July 1346 on the way to the battle of Crécy.

== Population ==
Historical population
Year	Pop.	±% p.a.
1968	544	—
1975	436	−3.11%
1982	451	+0.48%
1990	397	−1.58%
1999	356	−1.20%
2007	406	+1.66%
2012	393	−0.65%
2017	419	+1.29%
2023	392	−1.10%
Source: INSEE

== See also ==
- Communes of the Calvados department
