= La Folie =

- Commune
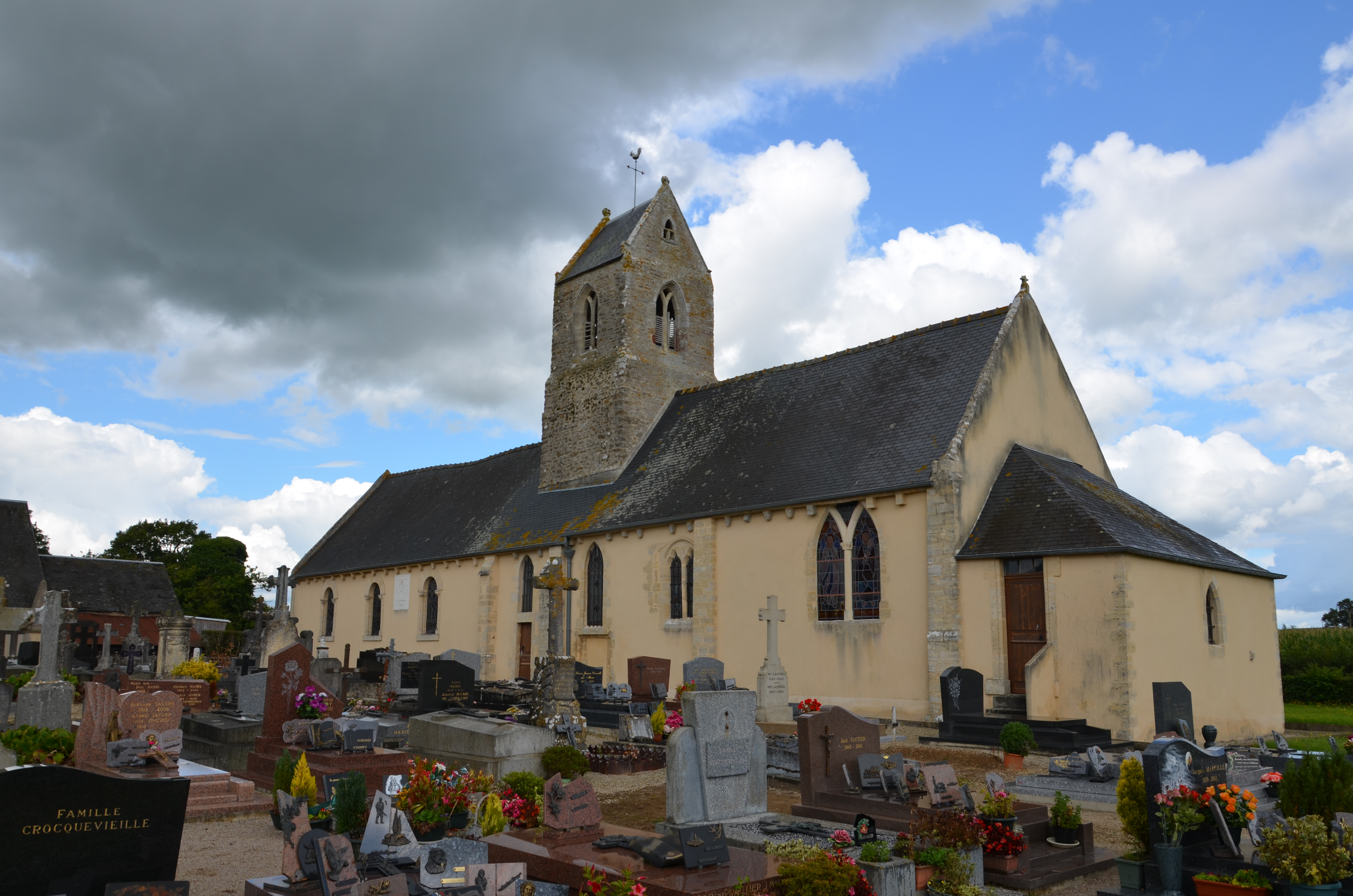
- The church in La Folie
- Location of La Folie
- Location within France Location within Normandy
- Coordinates: 49°15′34″N 0°58′37″W
- Country: France
- Region: Normandy
- Department: Calvados
- Arrondissement: Bayeux
- Canton: Trévières
- Intercommunality: CC Isigny-Omaha Intercom

Government
  - Mayor (2020–2026): Monique Picant
- Area^{1}: 6.53 km^{2} (2.52 sq mi)
- Elevation: 28 m (92 ft)
- Highest elevation: 63 m (207 ft)
- Lowest elevation: 14 m (46 ft)
- Population (2023): 108
  - Density: 16.5/km^{2} (42.8/sq mi)
- Time zone: UTC+01:00 (CET)
  - Summer (DST): UTC+02:00 (CEST)
- INSEE/Postal code: 14272 /14710
- ^{1} French Land Register data, which excludes lakes, ponds, glaciers > 1 km^{2} (0.386 sq mi or 247 acres) and river estuaries.

La Folie (French pronunciation: [la fɔli]) is a commune in the Calvados department in the Normandy region in northwestern France.

== Population ==
Historical population
Year	Pop.	±% p.a.
1968	178	—
1975	153	−2.14%
1982	124	−2.96%
1990	102	−2.41%
1999	114	+1.24%
2007	111	−0.33%
2012	124	+2.24%
2017	99	−4.40%
2023	108	+1.46%
Source: INSEE

== See also ==
- Communes of the Calvados department
