= Foulognes =

- Commune
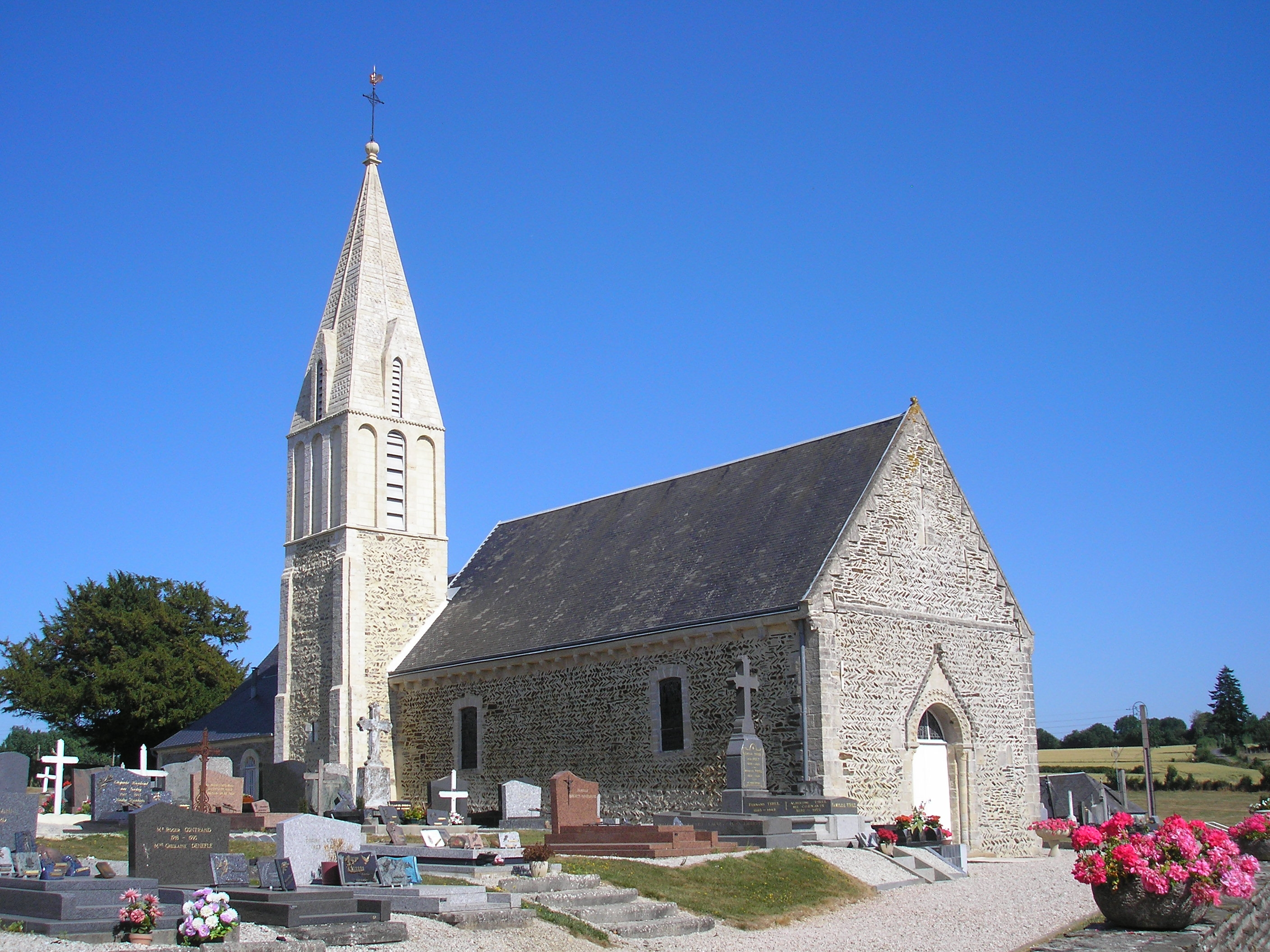
- The church in Foulognes
- Location of Foulognes
- Location within France Location within Normandy
- Coordinates: 49°08′35″N 0°48′47″W
- Country: France
- Region: Normandy
- Department: Calvados
- Arrondissement: Bayeux
- Canton: Trévières
- Intercommunality: CC Isigny-Omaha Intercom

Government
  - Mayor (2020–2026): Alain Lebigre
- Area^{1}: 6.43 km^{2} (2.48 sq mi)
- Elevation: 150 m (490 ft)
- Highest elevation: 176 m (577 ft)
- Lowest elevation: 95 m (312 ft)
- Population (2023): 220
  - Density: 34/km^{2} (89/sq mi)
- Time zone: UTC+01:00 (CET)
  - Summer (DST): UTC+02:00 (CEST)
- INSEE/Postal code: 14282 /14240
- ^{1} French Land Register data, which excludes lakes, ponds, glaciers > 1 km^{2} (0.386 sq mi or 247 acres) and river estuaries.

Foulognes (French pronunciation: [fulɔɲ]) is a commune in the Calvados department in the Normandy region in northwestern France.

== Population ==
Historical population
Year	Pop.	±% p.a.
1968	250	—
1975	209	−2.53%
1982	167	−3.15%
1990	183	+1.15%
1999	177	−0.37%
2007	160	−1.25%
2012	210	+5.59%
2017	197	−1.27%
2023	220	+1.86%
Source: INSEE

== See also ==
- Communes of the Calvados department
