= Saint-Germain-du-Pert =

- Commune
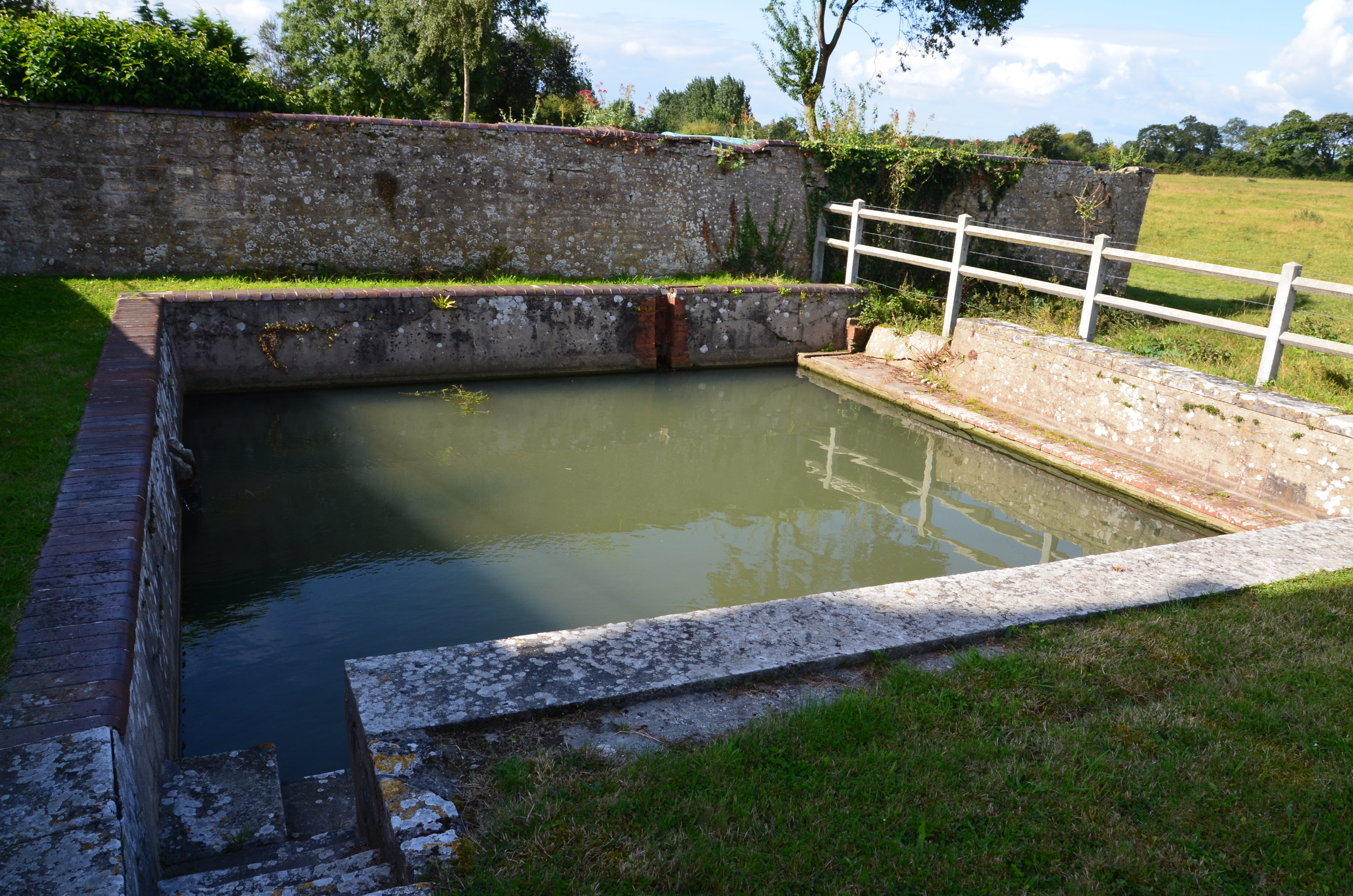
- The fountain of Saint-Lubin
- Location of Saint-Germain-du-Pert
- Location within France Location within Normandy
- Coordinates: 49°20′14″N 1°02′23″W
- Country: France
- Region: Normandy
- Department: Calvados
- Arrondissement: Bayeux
- Canton: Trévières
- Intercommunality: CC Isigny-Omaha Intercom

Government
  - Mayor (2020–2026): Denis Le Moigne
- Area^{1}: 6.03 km^{2} (2.33 sq mi)
- Elevation: 21 m (69 ft)
- Highest elevation: 40 m (130 ft)
- Lowest elevation: 0 m (0 ft)
- Population (2023): 148
  - Density: 24.5/km^{2} (63.6/sq mi)
- Time zone: UTC+01:00 (CET)
  - Summer (DST): UTC+02:00 (CEST)
- INSEE/Postal code: 14586 /14230
- ^{1} French Land Register data, which excludes lakes, ponds, glaciers > 1 km^{2} (0.386 sq mi or 247 acres) and river estuaries.

Saint-Germain-du-Pert (French pronunciation: [sɛ̃ ʒɛʁmɛ̃ dy pɛʁ]) is a commune in the Calvados department in the Normandy region in northwestern France.

== Population ==
Historical population
Year	Pop.	±% p.a.
1968	194	—
1975	176	−1.38%
1982	160	−1.35%
1990	147	−1.05%
1999	153	+0.45%
2007	149	−0.33%
2012	177	+3.50%
2017	179	+0.22%
2023	148	−3.12%
Source: INSEE

== See also ==
- Communes of the Calvados department
