= Sainte-Honorine-de-Ducy =

- Commune
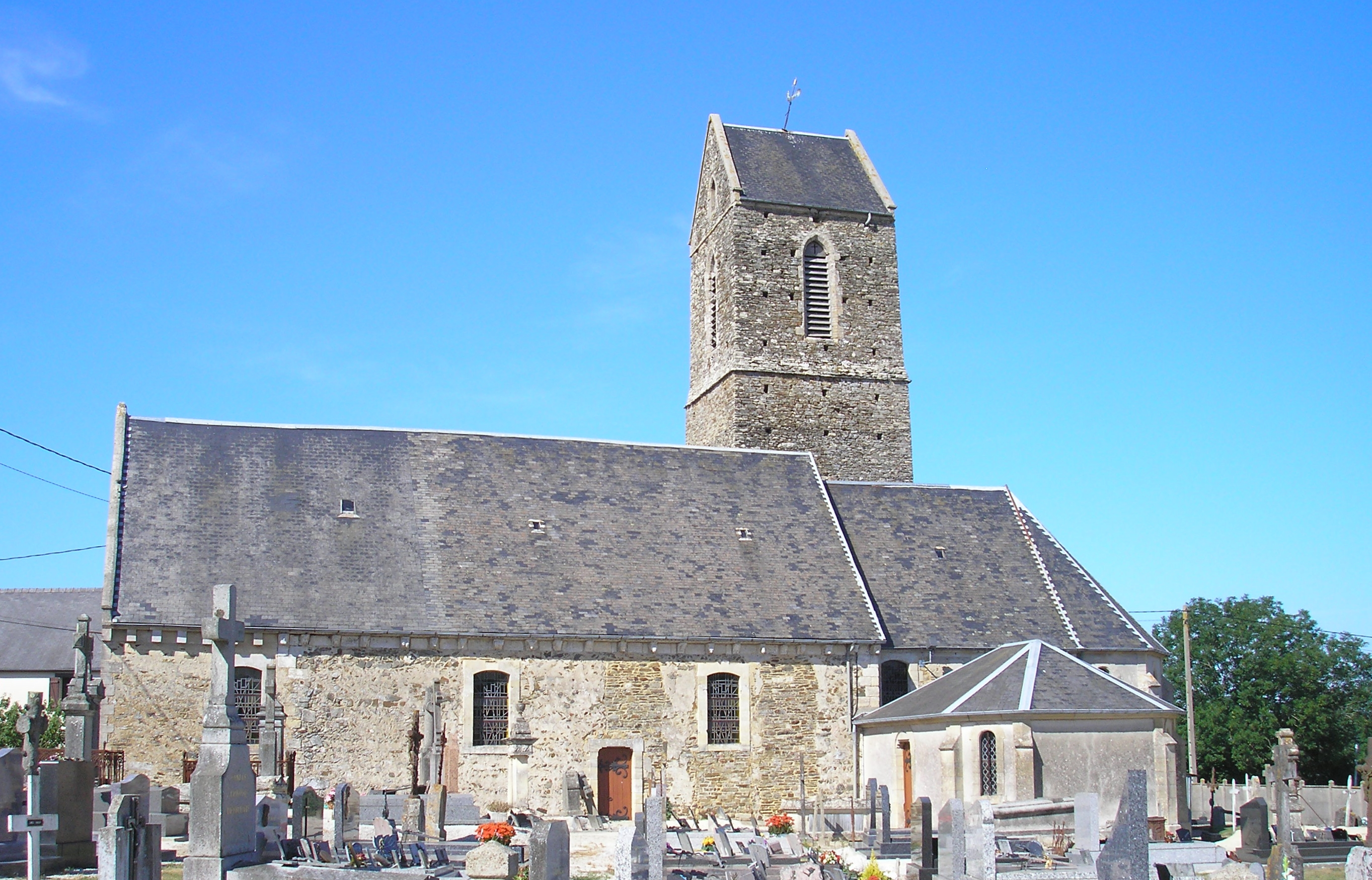
- The church in Sainte-Honorine-de-Ducy
- Location of Sainte-Honorine-de-Ducy
- Location within France Location within Normandy
- Coordinates: 49°08′50″N 0°46′34″W
- Country: France
- Region: Normandy
- Department: Calvados
- Arrondissement: Bayeux
- Canton: Trévières
- Intercommunality: CC Isigny-Omaha Intercom

Government
  - Mayor (2020–2026): Catherine Catherine
- Area^{1}: 4.99 km^{2} (1.93 sq mi)
- Elevation: 137 m (449 ft)
- Highest elevation: 168 m (551 ft)
- Lowest elevation: 110 m (360 ft)
- Population (2023): 136
  - Density: 27.3/km^{2} (70.6/sq mi)
- Time zone: UTC+01:00 (CET)
  - Summer (DST): UTC+02:00 (CEST)
- INSEE/Postal code: 14590 /14240
- ^{1} French Land Register data, which excludes lakes, ponds, glaciers > 1 km^{2} (0.386 sq mi or 247 acres) and river estuaries.

Sainte-Honorine-de-Ducy (French pronunciation: [sɛ̃t ɔnɔʁin də dysi]) is a commune in the Calvados department in the Normandy region in northwestern France.

== Population ==
Historical population
Year	Pop.	±% p.a.
1968	158	—
1975	128	−2.96%
1982	117	−1.28%
1990	113	−0.43%
1999	116	+0.29%
2007	131	+1.53%
2012	131	+0.00%
2017	127	−0.62%
2023	136	+1.15%
Source: INSEE

== See also ==
- Communes of the Calvados department
