= Sallen =

- Commune
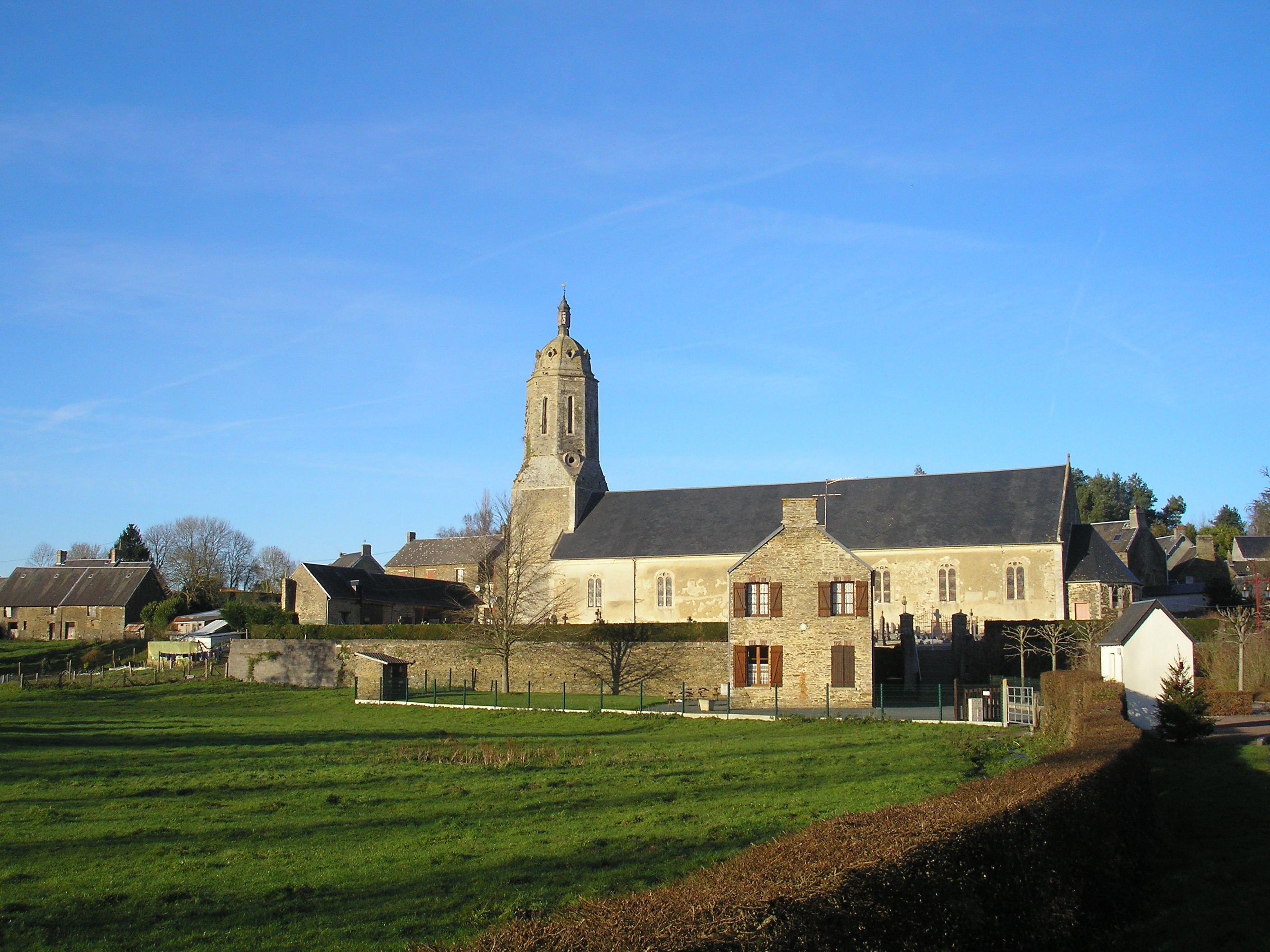
- The church in Sallen
- Location of Sallen
- Location within France Location within Normandy
- Coordinates: 49°06′53″N 0°49′39″W
- Country: France
- Region: Normandy
- Department: Calvados
- Arrondissement: Bayeux
- Canton: Trévières
- Intercommunality: CC Isigny-Omaha Intercom

Government
  - Mayor (2021–2026): Jean Colasse
- Area^{1}: 11.21 km^{2} (4.33 sq mi)
- Elevation: 128 m (420 ft)
- Highest elevation: 189 m (620 ft)
- Lowest elevation: 75 m (246 ft)
- Population (2023): 322
  - Density: 28.7/km^{2} (74.4/sq mi)
- Time zone: UTC+01:00 (CET)
  - Summer (DST): UTC+02:00 (CEST)
- INSEE/Postal code: 14664 /14240
- ^{1} French Land Register data, which excludes lakes, ponds, glaciers > 1 km^{2} (0.386 sq mi or 247 acres) and river estuaries.

Sallen (French pronunciation: [salɑ̃]) is a commune in the Calvados department in the Normandy region in northwestern France.

== Population ==
Historical population
Year	Pop.	±% p.a.
1968	338	—
1975	278	−2.75%
1982	252	−1.39%
1990	240	−0.61%
1999	234	−0.28%
2007	276	+2.08%
2012	295	+1.34%
2017	302	+0.47%
2023	322	+1.07%
Source: INSEE

== See also ==
- Communes of the Calvados department
