= Osmanville =

- Commune
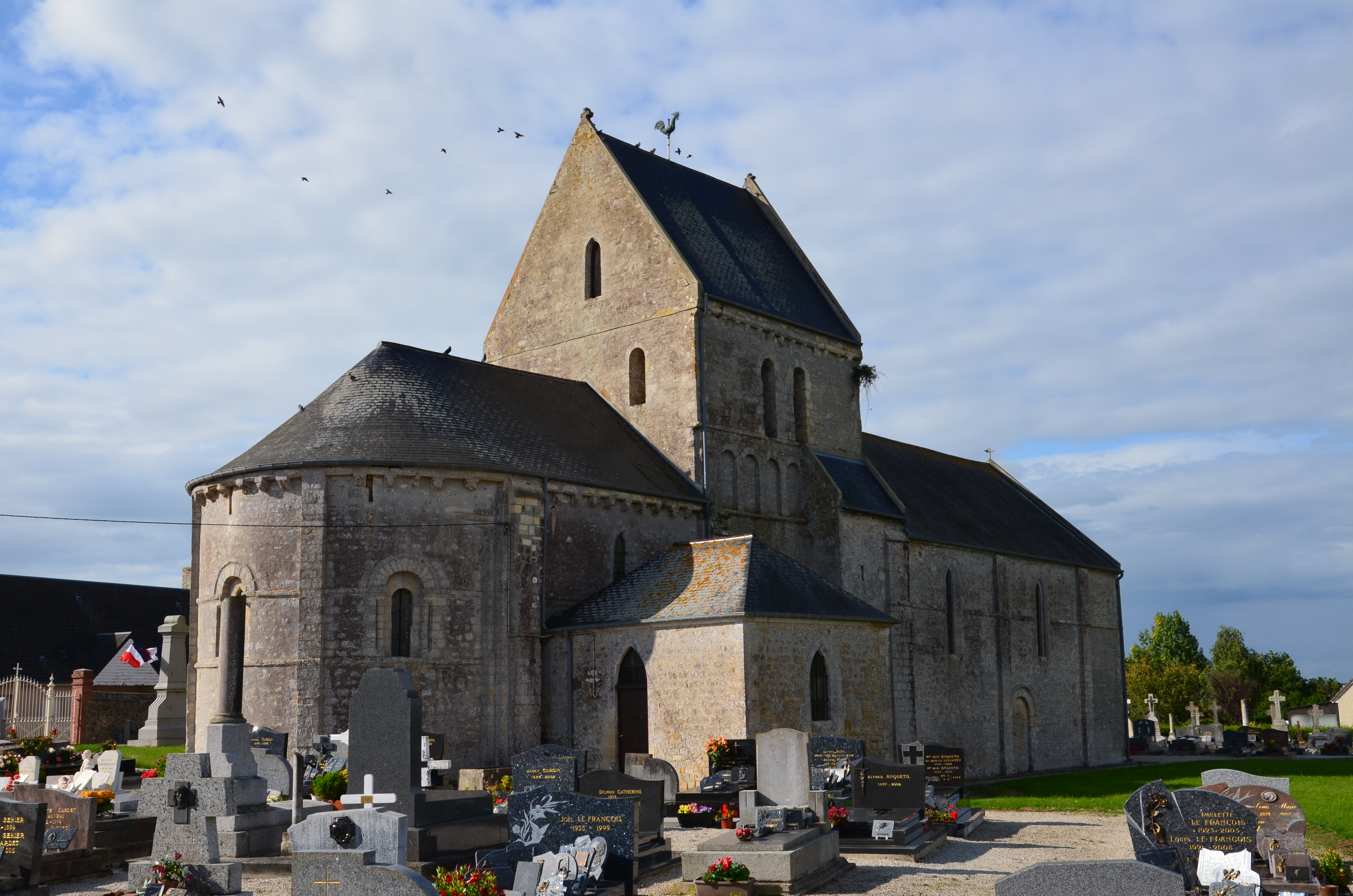
- The church in Osmanville
- Location of Osmanville
- Location within France Location within Normandy
- Coordinates: 49°19′46″N 1°04′48″W
- Country: France
- Region: Normandy
- Department: Calvados
- Arrondissement: Bayeux
- Canton: Trévières
- Intercommunality: CC Isigny-Omaha Intercom

Government
  - Mayor (2020–2026): Odile Benicourt
- Area^{1}: 10.88 km^{2} (4.20 sq mi)
- Elevation: 18 m (59 ft)
- Highest elevation: 31 m (102 ft)
- Lowest elevation: 0 m (0 ft)
- Population (2023): 510
  - Density: 47/km^{2} (120/sq mi)
- Time zone: UTC+01:00 (CET)
  - Summer (DST): UTC+02:00 (CEST)
- INSEE/Postal code: 14480 /14230
- ^{1} French Land Register data, which excludes lakes, ponds, glaciers > 1 km^{2} (0.386 sq mi or 247 acres) and river estuaries.

Osmanville (French pronunciation: [ɔsmɑ̃vil]) is a commune in the Calvados department in the Normandy region in northwestern France.

== Population ==
Historical population
Year	Pop.	±% p.a.
1968	365	—
1975	369	+0.16%
1982	395	+0.98%
1990	453	+1.73%
1999	514	+1.41%
2007	589	+1.72%
2012	591	+0.07%
2017	533	−2.04%
2023	510	−0.73%
Source: INSEE

== See also ==
- Communes of the Calvados department
