= Le Breuil-en-Bessin =

- Commune
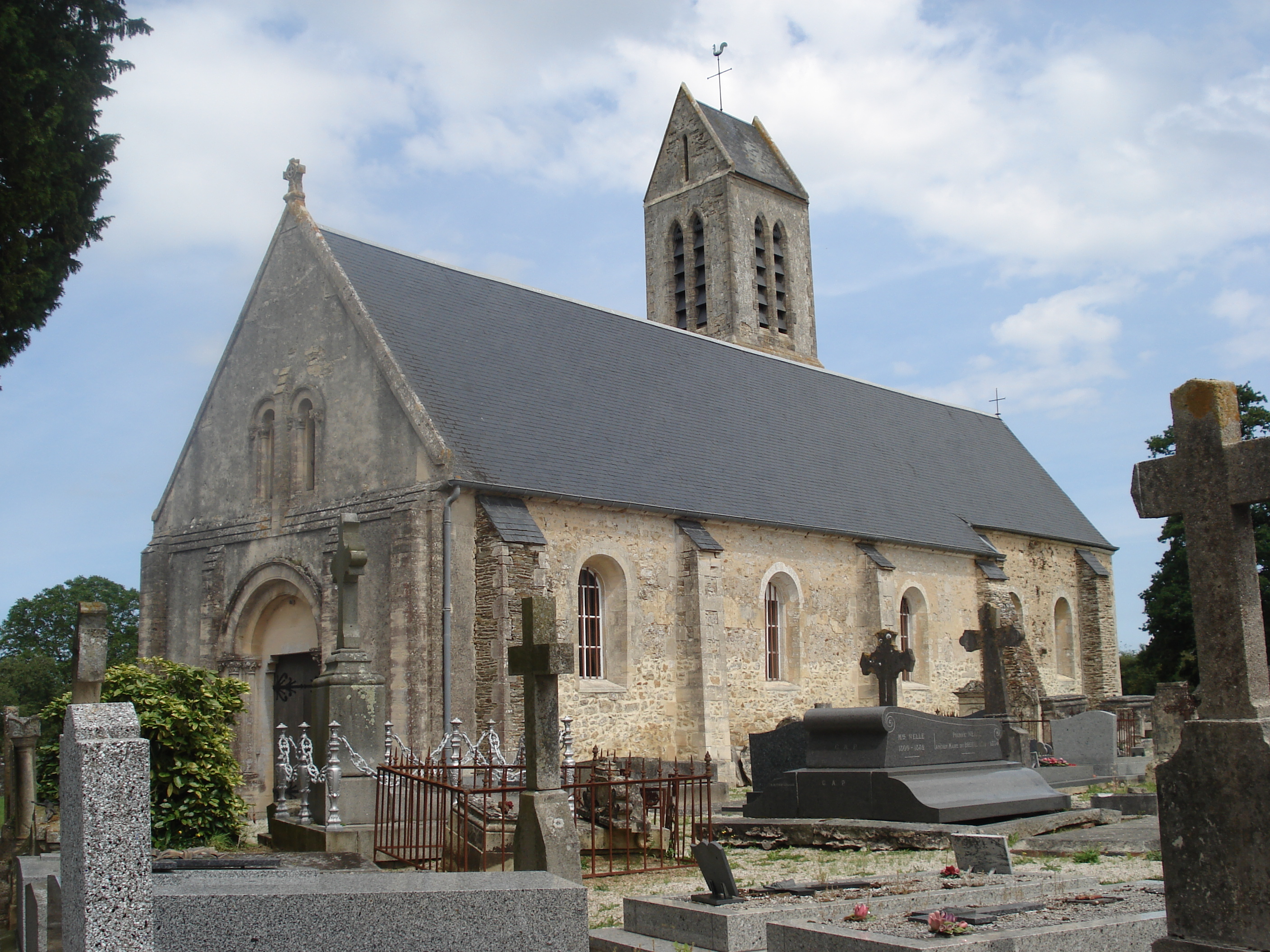
- The church in Le Breuil-en-Bessin

- Coat of arms
- Location of Le Breuil-en-Bessin
- Location within France Location within Normandy
- Coordinates: 49°15′21″N 0°51′25″W
- Country: France
- Region: Normandy
- Department: Calvados
- Arrondissement: Bayeux
- Canton: Trévières
- Intercommunality: CC Isigny-Omaha Intercom

Government
  - Mayor (2020–2026): Richard Folliot
- Area^{1}: 4.37 km^{2} (1.69 sq mi)
- Elevation: 20 m (66 ft)
- Highest elevation: 58 m (190 ft)
- Lowest elevation: 15 m (49 ft)
- Population (2023): 409
  - Density: 93.6/km^{2} (242/sq mi)
- Time zone: UTC+01:00 (CET)
  - Summer (DST): UTC+02:00 (CEST)
- INSEE/Postal code: 14103 /14330
- ^{1} French Land Register data, which excludes lakes, ponds, glaciers > 1 km^{2} (0.386 sq mi or 247 acres) and river estuaries.

Le Breuil-en-Bessin (French pronunciation: [lə bʁœj ɑ̃ bɛsɛ̃], literally Le Breuil in Bessin) is a commune in the Calvados department in the Normandy region in northwestern France.

== Population ==
Historical population
| Year | Pop. | ±% p.a. |
|---|---|---|
| 1968 | 223 | — |
| 1975 | 207 | −1.06% |
| 1982 | 221 | +0.94% |
| 1990 | 228 | +0.39% |
| 1999 | 258 | +1.38% |
| 2007 | 339 | +3.47% |
| 2012 | 424 | +4.58% |
| 2017 | 399 | −1.21% |
| 2023 | 409 | +0.41% |
Source: INSEE

== See also ==
- Communes of the Calvados department
