= Saint-Martin-de-Blagny =

- Commune
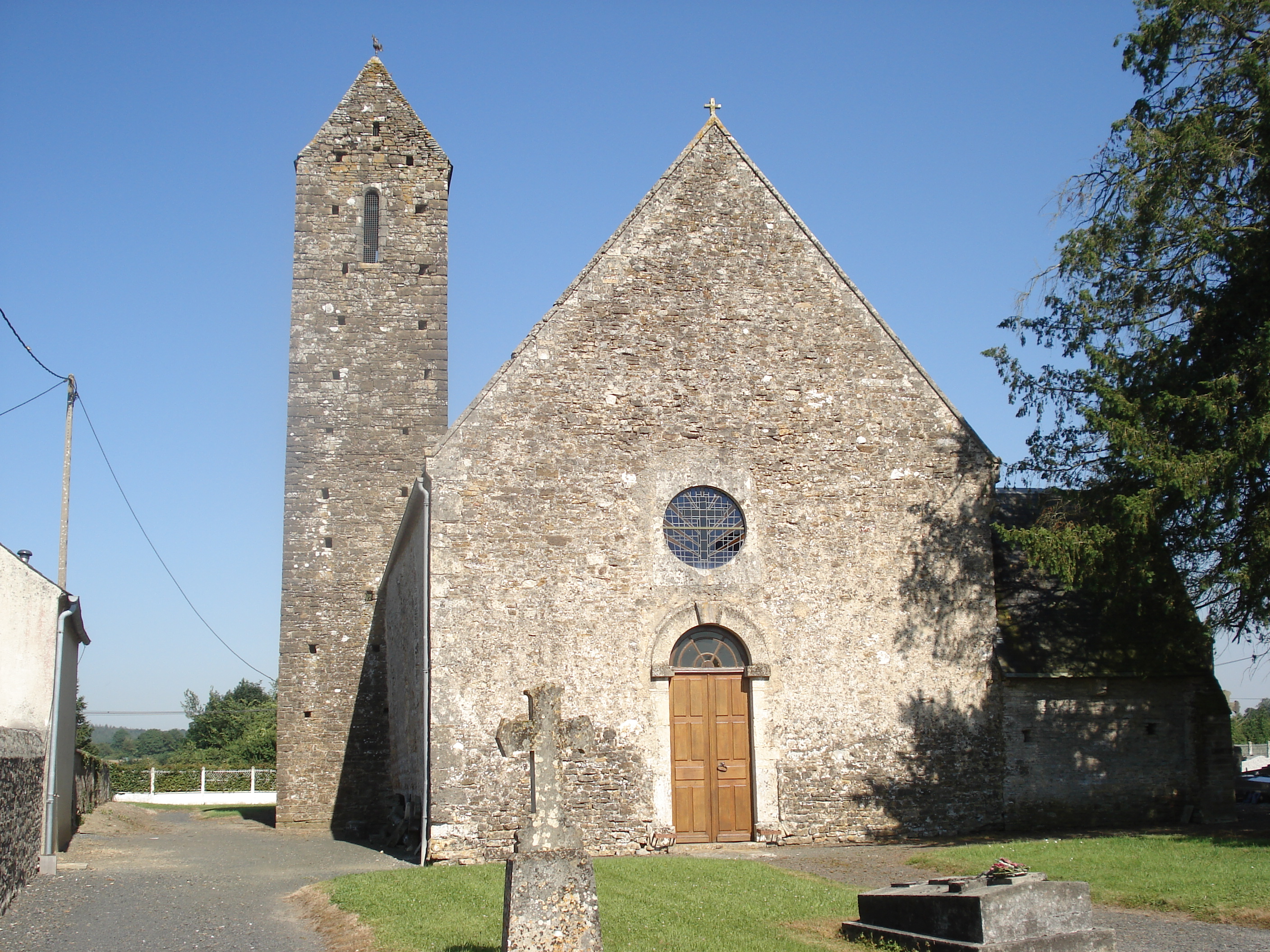
- The church in Saint-Martin-de-Blagny
- Location of Saint-Martin-de-Blagny
- Location within France Location within Normandy
- Coordinates: 49°15′07″N 0°56′47″W
- Country: France
- Region: Normandy
- Department: Calvados
- Arrondissement: Bayeux
- Canton: Trévières
- Intercommunality: CC Isigny-Omaha Intercom

Government
  - Mayor (2020–2026): Erick Suret
- Area^{1}: 8.89 km^{2} (3.43 sq mi)
- Elevation: 50 m (160 ft)
- Highest elevation: 75 m (246 ft)
- Lowest elevation: 12 m (39 ft)
- Population (2023): 118
  - Density: 13.3/km^{2} (34.4/sq mi)
- Time zone: UTC+01:00 (CET)
  - Summer (DST): UTC+02:00 (CEST)
- INSEE/Postal code: 14622 /14710
- ^{1} French Land Register data, which excludes lakes, ponds, glaciers > 1 km^{2} (0.386 sq mi or 247 acres) and river estuaries.

Saint-Martin-de-Blagny (French pronunciation: [sɛ̃ maʁtɛ̃ də blaɲi]) is a commune in the Calvados department in the Normandy region in northwestern France.

== Population ==
Historical population
Year	Pop.	±% p.a.
1968	219	—
1975	145	−5.72%
1982	139	−0.60%
1990	124	−1.42%
1999	122	−0.18%
2007	126	+0.40%
2012	130	+0.63%
2017	131	+0.15%
2023	118	−1.73%
Source: INSEE

== See also ==
- Communes of the Calvados department
