= Monfréville =

- Commune
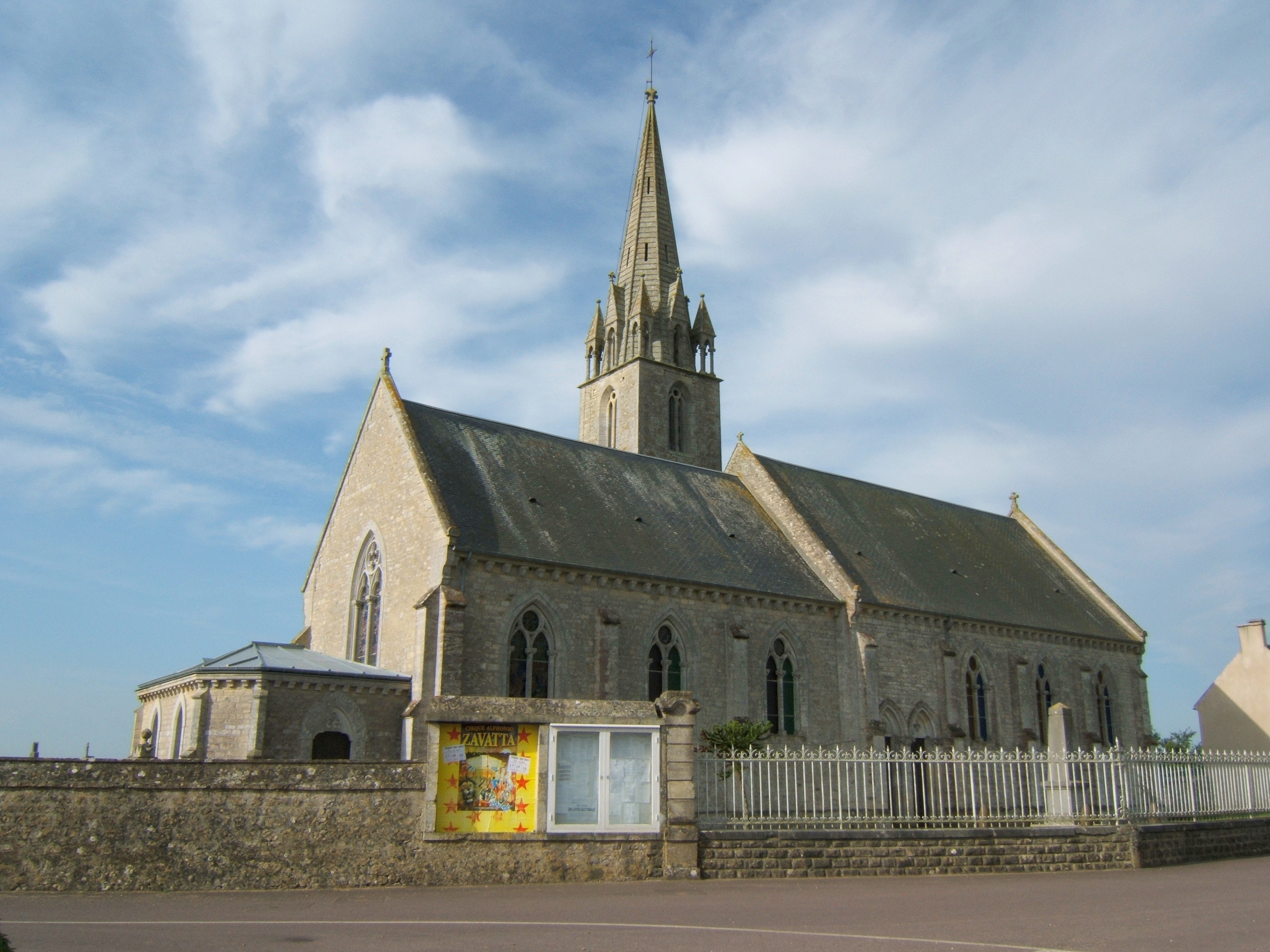
- The church in Monfréville
- Location of Monfréville
- Location within France Location within Normandy
- Coordinates: 49°18′33″N 1°02′10″W
- Country: France
- Region: Normandy
- Department: Calvados
- Arrondissement: Bayeux
- Canton: Trévières
- Intercommunality: CC Isigny-Omaha Intercom

Government
  - Mayor (2020–2026): René Debayeux
- Area^{1}: 7.22 km^{2} (2.79 sq mi)
- Elevation: 20 m (66 ft)
- Highest elevation: 42 m (138 ft)
- Lowest elevation: 1 m (3.3 ft)
- Population (2023): 101
  - Density: 14.0/km^{2} (36.2/sq mi)
- Time zone: UTC+01:00 (CET)
  - Summer (DST): UTC+02:00 (CEST)
- INSEE/Postal code: 14439 /14230
- ^{1} French Land Register data, which excludes lakes, ponds, glaciers > 1 km^{2} (0.386 sq mi or 247 acres) and river estuaries.

Monfréville (French pronunciation: [mɔ̃fʁevil]) is a commune in the Calvados department in the Normandy region in northwestern France.

== Population ==
Historical population
Year	Pop.	±% p.a.
1968	155	—
1975	154	−0.09%
1982	135	−1.86%
1990	102	−3.44%
1999	94	−0.90%
2007	104	+1.27%
2012	105	+0.19%
2017	94	−2.19%
2023	101	+1.20%
Source: INSEE

== See also ==
- Communes of the Calvados department
