= Sainte-Marguerite-d'Elle =

- Commune
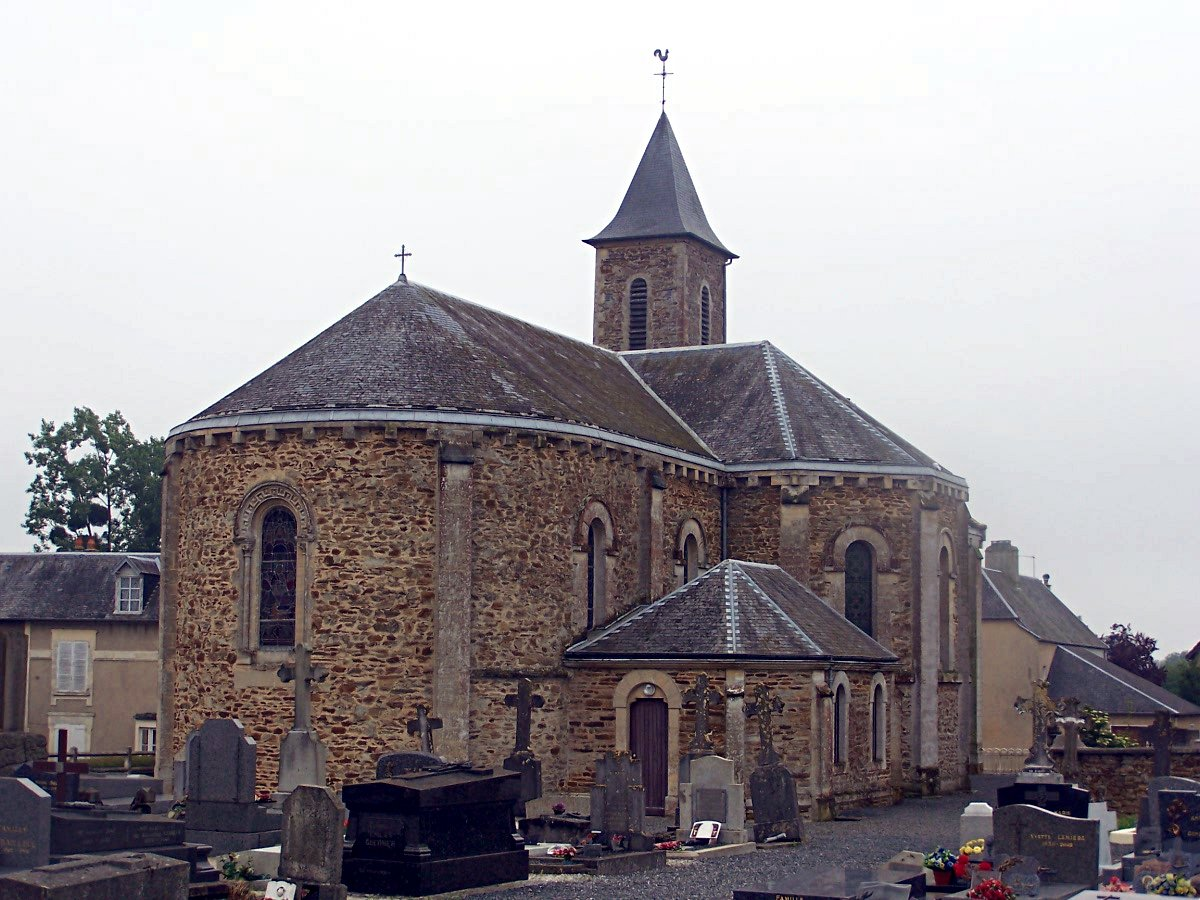
- The church in Sainte-Marguerite-d'Elle
- Location of Sainte-Marguerite-d'Elle
- Location within France Location within Normandy
- Coordinates: 49°12′29″N 1°01′13″W
- Country: France
- Region: Normandy
- Department: Calvados
- Arrondissement: Bayeux
- Canton: Trévières
- Intercommunality: CC Isigny-Omaha Intercom

Government
  - Mayor (2020–2026): Érick Dorand
- Area^{1}: 20.49 km^{2} (7.91 sq mi)
- Elevation: 46 m (151 ft)
- Highest elevation: 85 m (279 ft)
- Lowest elevation: 4 m (13 ft)
- Population (2023): 757
  - Density: 36.9/km^{2} (95.7/sq mi)
- Time zone: UTC+01:00 (CET)
  - Summer (DST): UTC+02:00 (CEST)
- INSEE/Postal code: 14614 /14330
- ^{1} French Land Register data, which excludes lakes, ponds, glaciers > 1 km^{2} (0.386 sq mi or 247 acres) and river estuaries.

Sainte-Marguerite-d'Elle (French pronunciation: [sɛ̃t maʁɡərit dɛl], literally Sainte Marguerite of Elle) is a commune in the Calvados department in the Normandy region in northwestern France.

== Population ==
Historical population
Year	Pop.	±% p.a.
1968	890	—
1975	831	−0.98%
1982	760	−1.27%
1990	758	−0.03%
1999	743	−0.22%
2007	755	+0.20%
2012	765	+0.26%
2017	767	+0.05%
2023	757	−0.22%
Source: INSEE

== See also ==
- Communes of the Calvados department
