= Noron-la-Poterie =

- Commune
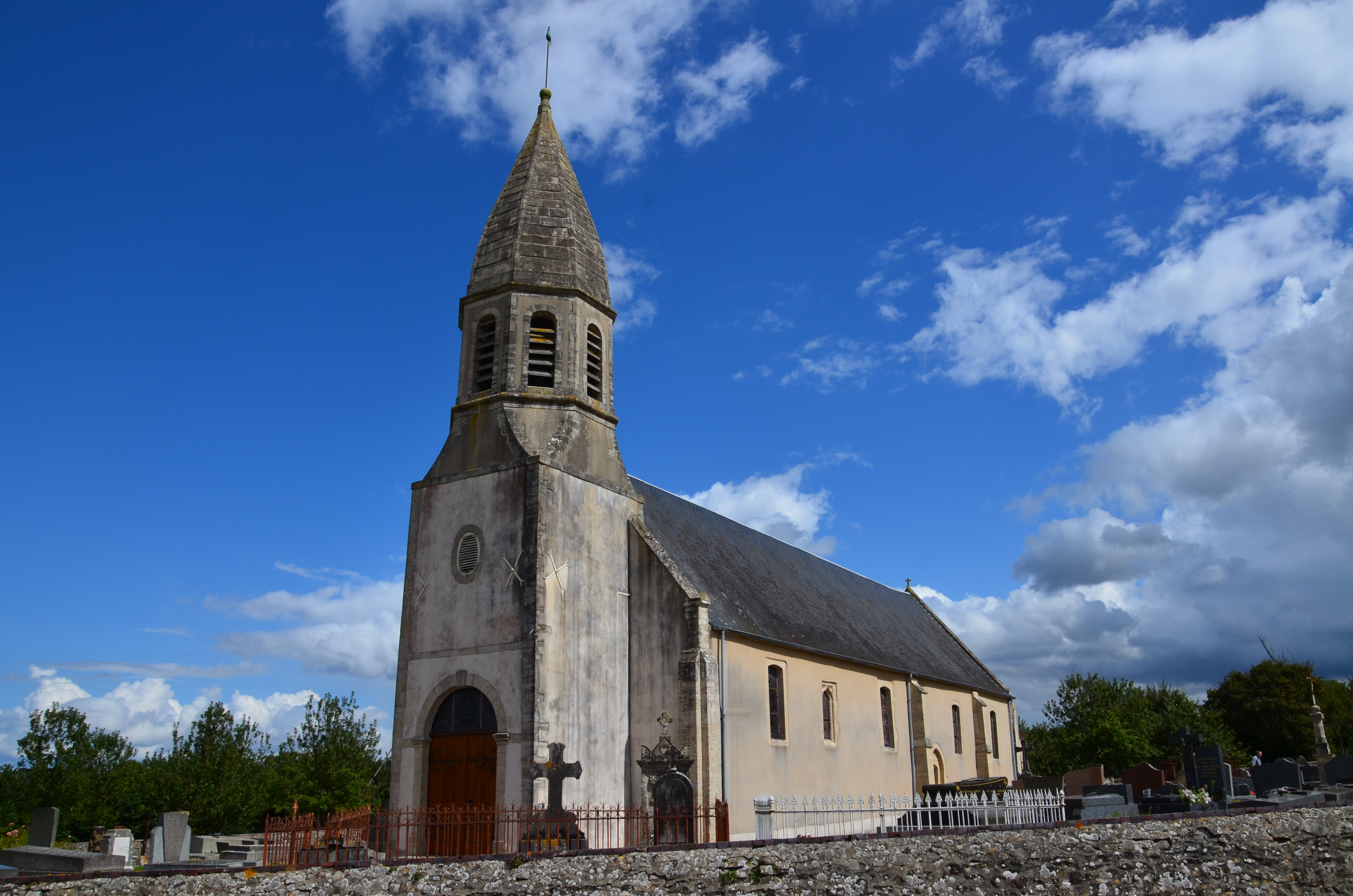
- The church in Noron-la-Poterie
- Location of Noron-la-Poterie
- Location within France Location within Normandy
- Coordinates: 49°13′38″N 0°46′25″W
- Country: France
- Region: Normandy
- Department: Calvados
- Arrondissement: Bayeux
- Canton: Trévières
- Intercommunality: CC Isigny-Omaha Intercom

Government
  - Mayor (2020–2026): François Scelles
- Area^{1}: 3.01 km^{2} (1.16 sq mi)
- Elevation: 55 m (180 ft)
- Highest elevation: 76 m (249 ft)
- Lowest elevation: 34 m (112 ft)
- Population (2023): 332
  - Density: 110/km^{2} (286/sq mi)
- Time zone: UTC+01:00 (CET)
  - Summer (DST): UTC+02:00 (CEST)
- INSEE/Postal code: 14468 /14490
- ^{1} French Land Register data, which excludes lakes, ponds, glaciers > 1 km^{2} (0.386 sq mi or 247 acres) and river estuaries.

Noron-la-Poterie (French pronunciation: [nɔʁɔ̃ la pɔtʁi]) is a commune in the Calvados department in the Normandy region in northwestern France.

== Population ==
Historical population
| Year | Pop. | ±% p.a. |
|---|---|---|
| 1968 | 201 | — |
| 1975 | 218 | +1.17% |
| 1982 | 266 | +2.88% |
| 1990 | 248 | −0.87% |
| 1999 | 289 | +1.71% |
| 2007 | 291 | +0.09% |
| 2012 | 364 | +4.58% |
| 2017 | 397 | +1.75% |
| 2023 | 332 | −2.94% |
Source: INSEE

== See also ==
- Communes of the Calvados department
