= Cahagnolles =

- Commune
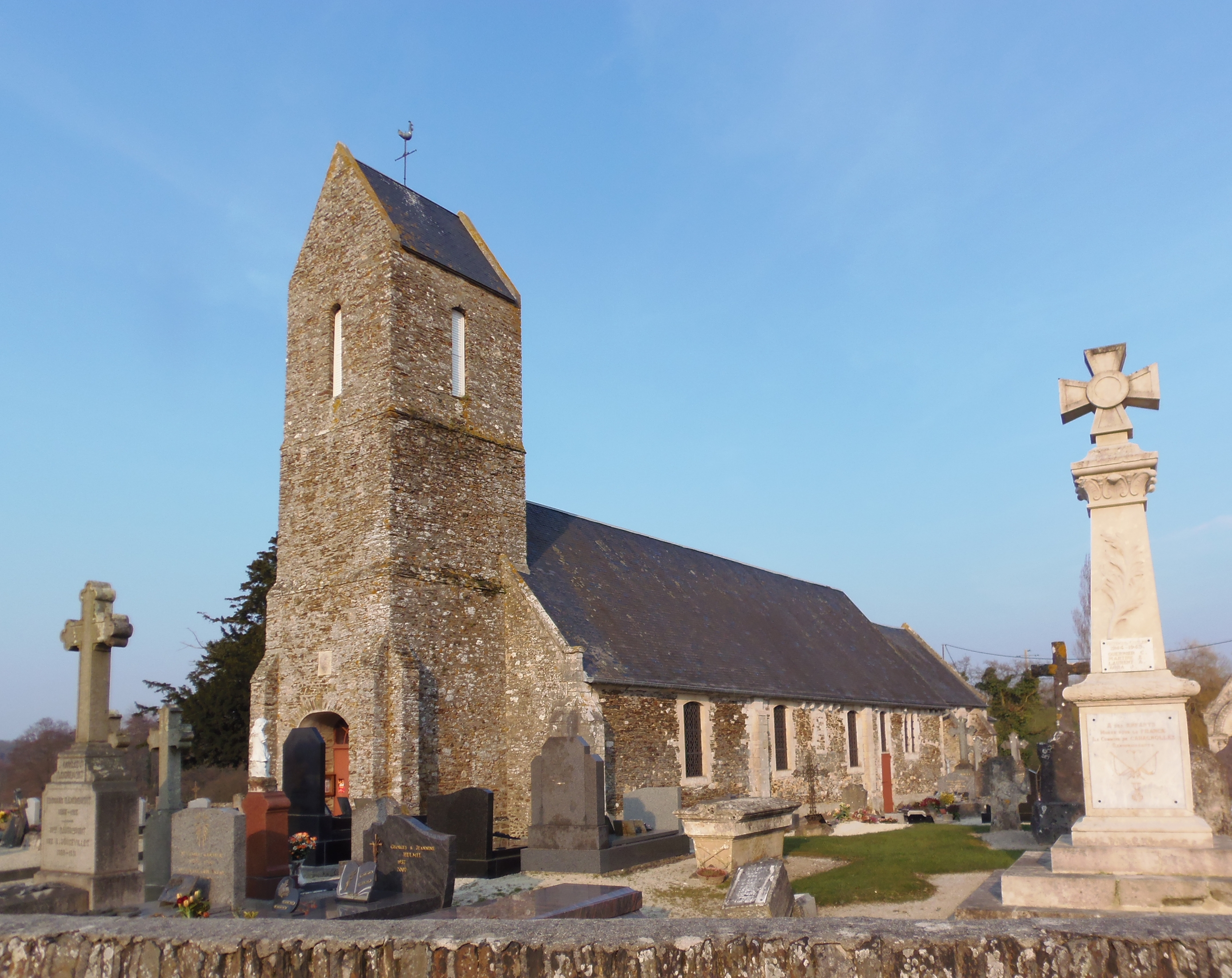
- The church in Cahagnolles
- Location of Cahagnolles
- Location within France Location within Normandy
- Coordinates: 49°09′33″N 0°45′36″W
- Country: France
- Region: Normandy
- Department: Calvados
- Arrondissement: Bayeux
- Canton: Trévières
- Intercommunality: CC Isigny-Omaha Intercom

Government
  - Mayor (2020–2026): Michel Léger
- Area^{1}: 7.17 km^{2} (2.77 sq mi)
- Elevation: 30 m (98 ft)
- Highest elevation: 139 m (456 ft)
- Lowest elevation: 83 m (272 ft)
- Population (2023): 252
  - Density: 35.1/km^{2} (91.0/sq mi)
- Time zone: UTC+01:00 (CET)
  - Summer (DST): UTC+02:00 (CEST)
- INSEE/Postal code: 14121 /14490
- ^{1} French Land Register data, which excludes lakes, ponds, glaciers > 1 km^{2} (0.386 sq mi or 247 acres) and river estuaries.

Cahagnolles (French pronunciation: [ka.aɲɔl]) is a commune in the Calvados department in the Normandy region in northwestern France.

== Population ==
Historical population
Year	Pop.	±% p.a.
1968	216	—
1975	160	−4.20%
1982	148	−1.11%
1990	172	+1.90%
1999	177	+0.32%
2007	215	+2.46%
2012	255	+3.47%
2017	254	−0.08%
2023	252	−0.13%
Source: INSEE

== See also ==
- Communes of the Calvados department
