= Saon =

- Commune
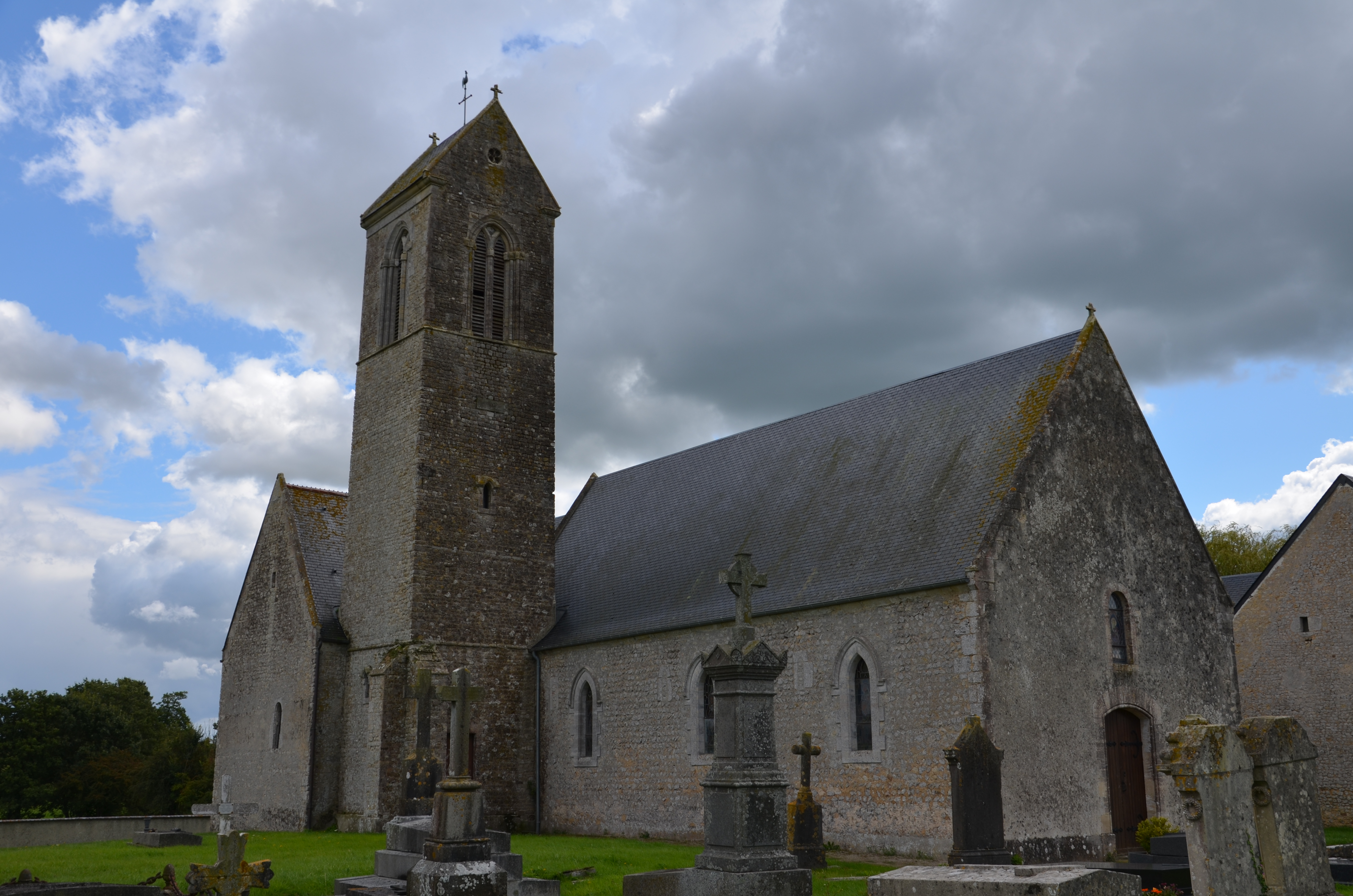
- The church in Saon
- Location of Saon
- Location within France Location within Normandy
- Coordinates: 49°16′16″N 0°51′22″W
- Country: France
- Region: Normandy
- Department: Calvados
- Arrondissement: Bayeux
- Canton: Trévières
- Intercommunality: CC Isigny-Omaha Intercom

Government
  - Mayor (2020–2026): Aurore Dewaele
- Area^{1}: 5.24 km^{2} (2.02 sq mi)
- Elevation: 150 m (490 ft)
- Highest elevation: 76 m (249 ft)
- Lowest elevation: 7 m (23 ft)
- Population (2023): 226
  - Density: 43.1/km^{2} (112/sq mi)
- Time zone: UTC+01:00 (CET)
  - Summer (DST): UTC+02:00 (CEST)
- INSEE/Postal code: 14667 /14330
- ^{1} French Land Register data, which excludes lakes, ponds, glaciers > 1 km^{2} (0.386 sq mi or 247 acres) and river estuaries.

Saon is a commune in the Calvados department in the Normandy region in northwestern France.

== Population ==
Historical population
Year	Pop.	±% p.a.
1968	280	—
1975	248	−1.72%
1982	189	−3.81%
1990	182	−0.47%
1999	217	+1.97%
2007	231	+0.78%
2012	232	+0.09%
2017	225	−0.61%
2023	226	+0.07%
Source: INSEE

== See also ==
- Communes of the Calvados department
