= Canchy, Calvados =

Canchy
- Commune
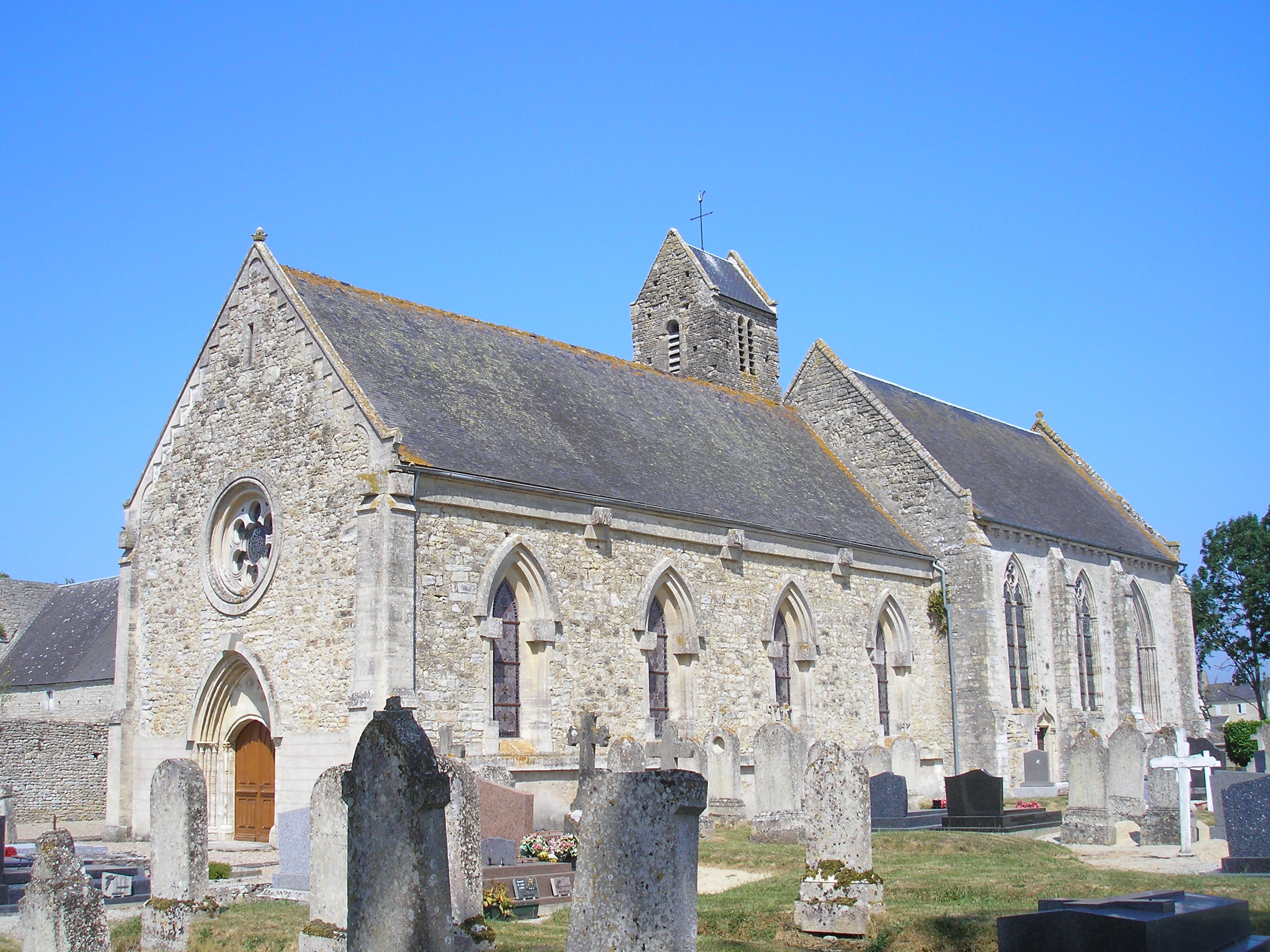
- The church in Canchy
- Location of Canchy
- Location within France Location within Normandy
- Coordinates: 49°19′50″N 0°58′54″W
- Country: France
- Region: Normandy
- Department: Calvados
- Arrondissement: Bayeux
- Canton: Trévières
- Intercommunality: CC Isigny-Omaha Intercom

Government
  - Mayor (2020–2026): Michel Fauvel
- Area^{1}: 5.72 km^{2} (2.21 sq mi)
- Elevation: 30 m (98 ft)
- Highest elevation: 39 m (128 ft)
- Lowest elevation: 0 m (0 ft)
- Population (2023): 202
  - Density: 35.3/km^{2} (91.5/sq mi)
- Time zone: UTC+01:00 (CET)
  - Summer (DST): UTC+02:00 (CEST)
- INSEE/Postal code: 14132 /14230
- ^{1} French Land Register data, which excludes lakes, ponds, glaciers > 1 km^{2} (0.386 sq mi or 247 acres) and river estuaries.

Canchy (French pronunciation: [kɑ̃ʃi]) is a commune in the Calvados department and Normandy region of north-western France.

== Population ==
Historical population
| Year | Pop. | ±% p.a. |
|---|---|---|
| 1968 | 243 | — |
| 1975 | 196 | −3.02% |
| 1982 | 172 | −1.85% |
| 1990 | 175 | +0.22% |
| 1999 | 185 | +0.62% |
| 2007 | 209 | +1.54% |
| 2012 | 212 | +0.29% |
| 2017 | 205 | −0.67% |
| 2023 | 202 | −0.25% |
Source: INSEE

== See also ==
- Communes of the Calvados department
