= Trungy =

- Commune
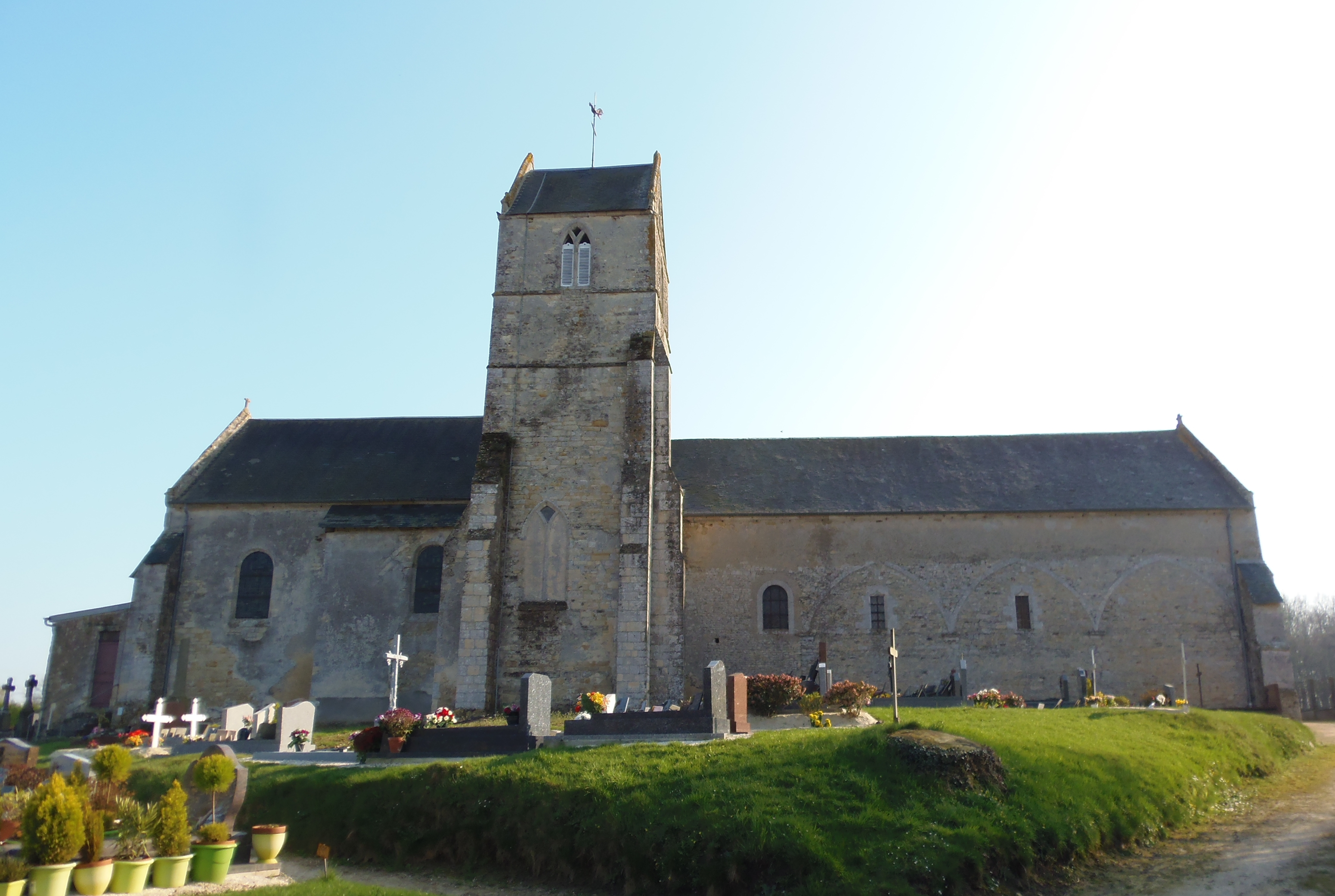
- The church in Trungy
- Location of Trungy
- Location within France Location within Normandy
- Coordinates: 49°11′51″N 0°43′21″W
- Country: France
- Region: Normandy
- Department: Calvados
- Arrondissement: Bayeux
- Canton: Trévières
- Intercommunality: CC Isigny-Omaha Intercom

Government
  - Mayor (2020–2026): Bernard Pacary
- Area^{1}: 7.07 km^{2} (2.73 sq mi)
- Elevation: 78 m (256 ft)
- Highest elevation: 108 m (354 ft)
- Lowest elevation: 54 m (177 ft)
- Population (2023): 209
  - Density: 29.6/km^{2} (76.6/sq mi)
- Time zone: UTC+01:00 (CET)
  - Summer (DST): UTC+02:00 (CEST)
- INSEE/Postal code: 14716 /14490
- ^{1} French Land Register data, which excludes lakes, ponds, glaciers > 1 km^{2} (0.386 sq mi or 247 acres) and river estuaries.

Trungy (French pronunciation: [tʁœ̃ʒi]) is a commune in the Calvados department in the Normandy region in northwestern France.

== Population ==
Historical population
Year	Pop.	±% p.a.
1968	268	—
1975	212	−3.29%
1982	209	−0.20%
1990	209	+0.00%
1999	234	+1.26%
2007	218	−0.88%
2012	228	+0.90%
2017	215	−1.17%
2023	209	−0.47%
Source: INSEE

== See also ==
- Communes of the Calvados department
