= Saint-Paul-du-Vernay =

- Commune
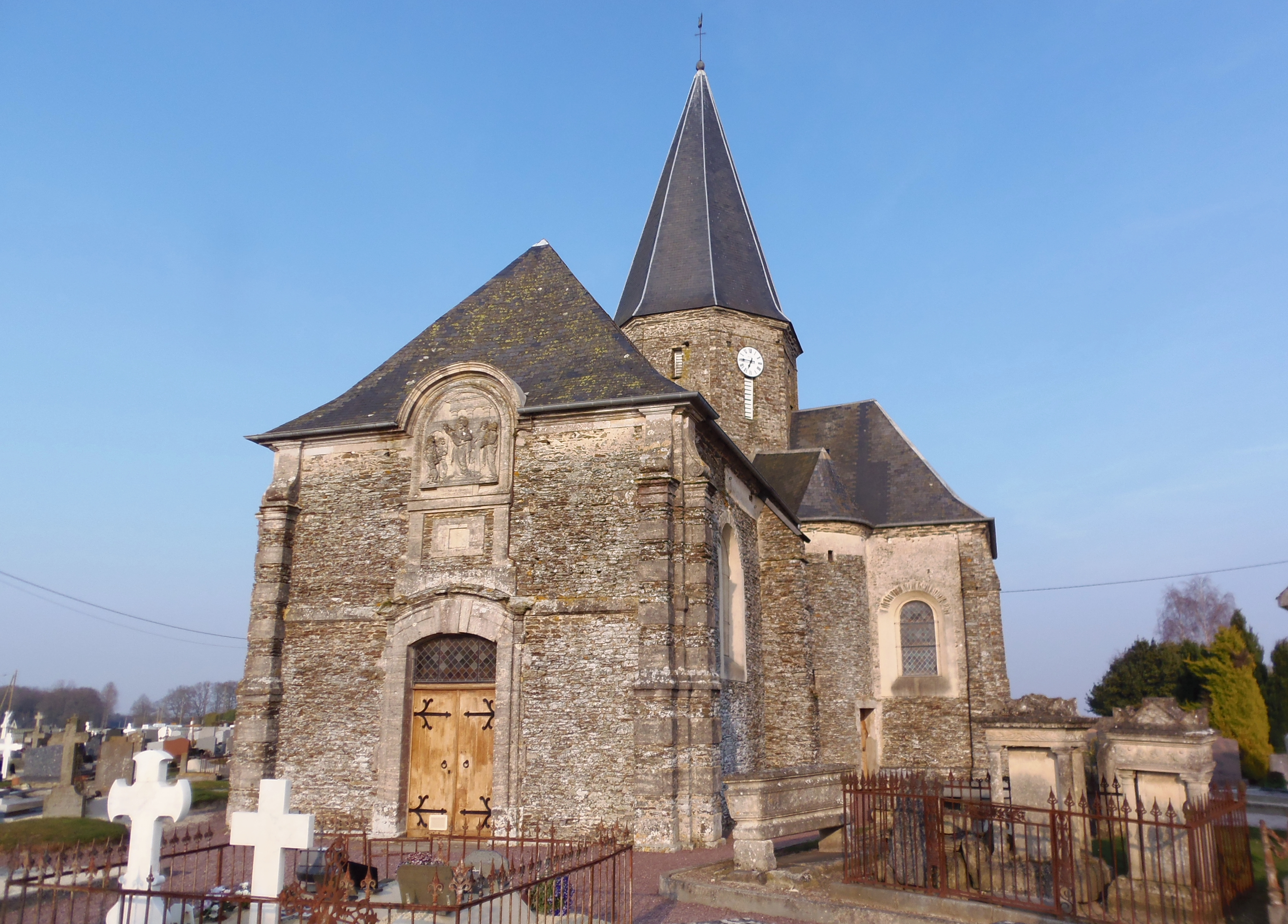
- The church in Saint-Paul-du-Vernay
- Location of Saint-Paul-du-Vernay
- Location within France Location within Normandy
- Coordinates: 49°11′18″N 0°45′38″W
- Country: France
- Region: Normandy
- Department: Calvados
- Arrondissement: Bayeux
- Canton: Trévières
- Intercommunality: CC Isigny-Omaha Intercom

Government
  - Mayor (2020–2026): Serge Lepelletier
- Area^{1}: 15.13 km^{2} (5.84 sq mi)
- Elevation: 126 m (413 ft)
- Highest elevation: 139 m (456 ft)
- Lowest elevation: 35 m (115 ft)
- Population (2023): 831
  - Density: 54.9/km^{2} (142/sq mi)
- Time zone: UTC+01:00 (CET)
  - Summer (DST): UTC+02:00 (CEST)
- INSEE/Postal code: 14643 /14490
- ^{1} French Land Register data, which excludes lakes, ponds, glaciers > 1 km^{2} (0.386 sq mi or 247 acres) and river estuaries.

Saint-Paul-du-Vernay (French pronunciation: [sɛ̃ pɔl də vɛʁnɛ]) is a commune in the Calvados department in the Normandy region in northwestern France.

== Population ==
Historical population
Year	Pop.	±% p.a.
1968	625	—
1975	535	−2.20%
1982	578	+1.11%
1990	612	+0.72%
1999	650	+0.67%
2007	667	+0.32%
2012	759	+2.62%
2017	818	+1.51%
2023	831	+0.26%
Source: INSEE

== See also ==
- Communes of the Calvados department
