= Tournières =

- Commune
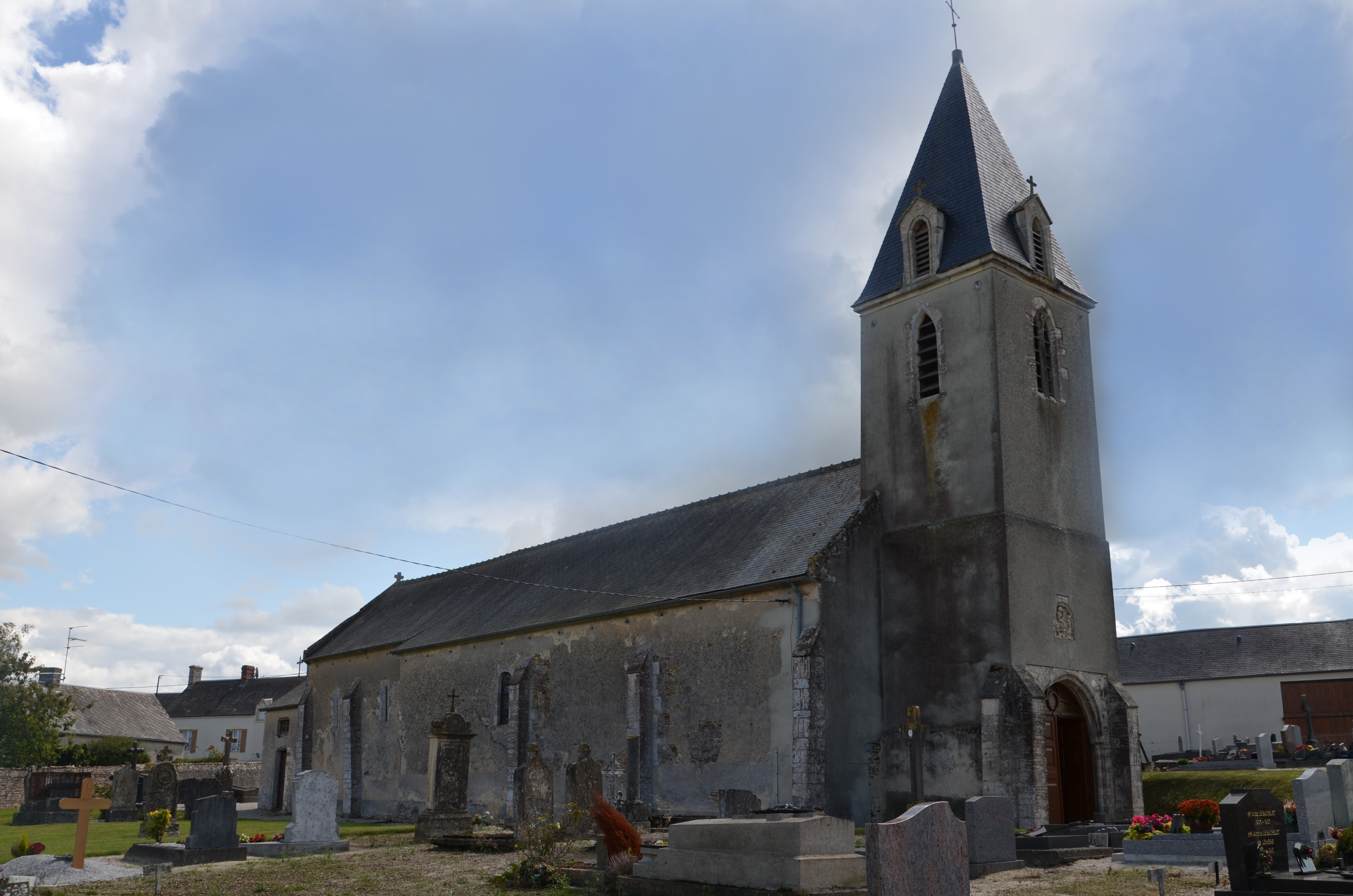
- The church in Tournières
- Location of Tournières
- Location within France Location within Normandy
- Coordinates: 49°14′02″N 0°55′43″W
- Country: France
- Region: Normandy
- Department: Calvados
- Arrondissement: Bayeux
- Canton: Trévières
- Intercommunality: CC Isigny-Omaha Intercom

Government
  - Mayor (2020–2026): Michel Cambron
- Area^{1}: 3.41 km^{2} (1.32 sq mi)
- Elevation: 64 m (210 ft)
- Highest elevation: 76 m (249 ft)
- Lowest elevation: 34 m (112 ft)
- Population (2023): 148
  - Density: 43.4/km^{2} (112/sq mi)
- Time zone: UTC+01:00 (CET)
  - Summer (DST): UTC+02:00 (CEST)
- INSEE/Postal code: 14705 /14330
- ^{1} French Land Register data, which excludes lakes, ponds, glaciers > 1 km^{2} (0.386 sq mi or 247 acres) and river estuaries.

Tournières (French pronunciation: [tuʁnjɛʁ]) is a commune in the Calvados department in the Normandy region in northwestern France.

== Population ==
Historical population
Year	Pop.	±% p.a.
1968	213	—
1975	205	−0.55%
1982	188	−1.23%
1990	184	−0.27%
1999	171	−0.81%
2007	177	+0.43%
2012	167	−1.16%
2017	152	−1.86%
2023	148	−0.44%
Source: INSEE

== See also ==
- Communes of the Calvados department
