= La Bazoque, Calvados =

La Bazoque
- Commune
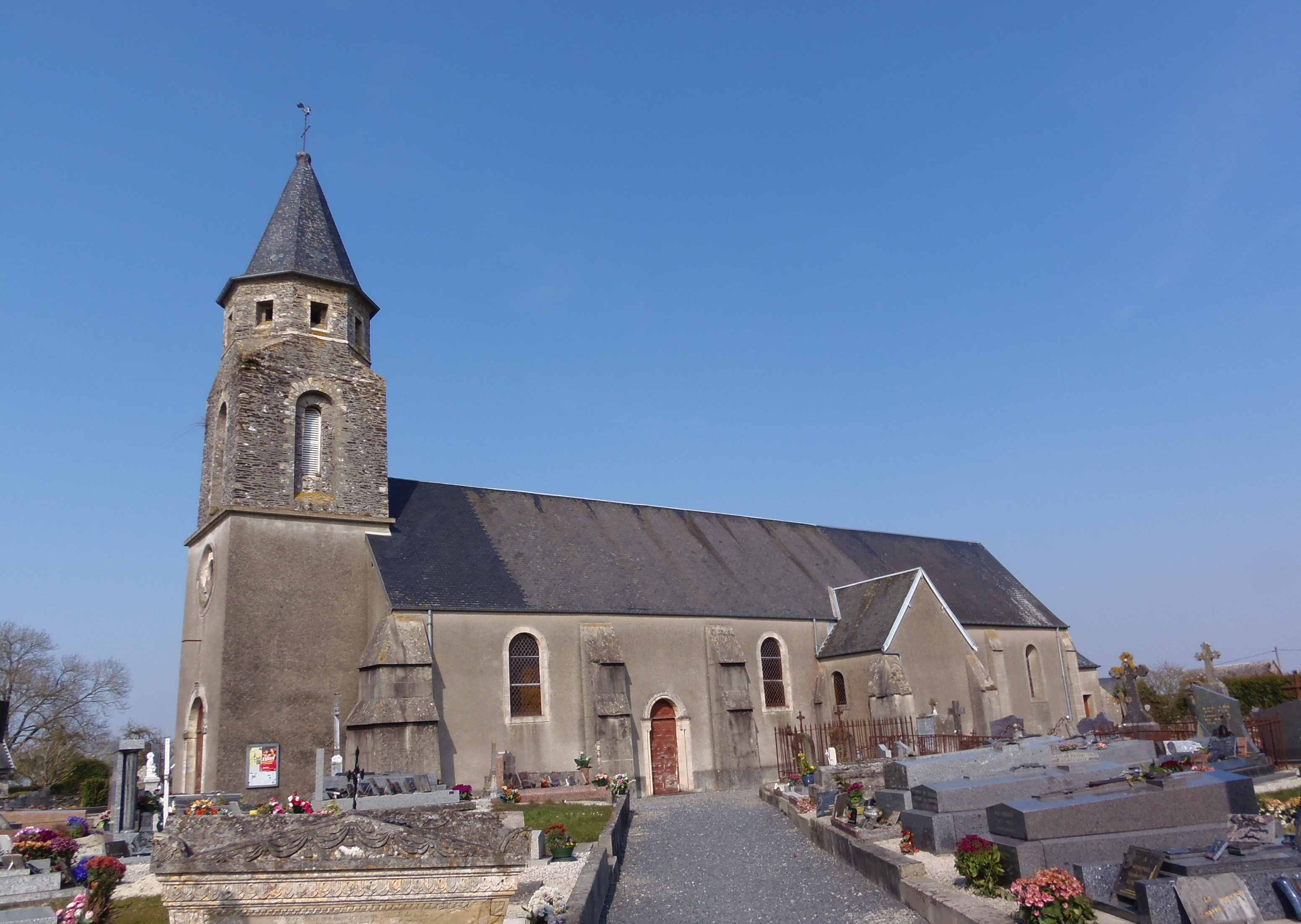
- The Church of Saint Martin
- Location of La Bazoque
- Location within France Location within Normandy
- Coordinates: 49°09′35″N 0°51′59″W
- Country: France
- Region: Normandy
- Department: Calvados
- Arrondissement: Bayeux
- Canton: Trévières
- Intercommunality: CC Isigny-Omaha Intercom

Government
  - Mayor (2020–2026): Francis Corbeaux
- Area^{1}: 10.14 km^{2} (3.92 sq mi)
- Elevation: 150 m (490 ft)
- Highest elevation: 142 m (466 ft)
- Lowest elevation: 57 m (187 ft)
- Population (2023): 193
  - Density: 19.0/km^{2} (49.3/sq mi)
- Time zone: UTC+01:00 (CET)
  - Summer (DST): UTC+02:00 (CEST)
- INSEE/Postal code: 14050 /14490
- ^{1} French Land Register data, which excludes lakes, ponds, glaciers > 1 km^{2} (0.386 sq mi or 247 acres) and river estuaries.

La Bazoque (French pronunciation: [la bazɔk]) is a commune in the Calvados department in the Normandy region of north-western France.

The inhabitants of the commune are known as Bazocains or Bazocaines.

== Geography ==
La Bazoque is located some 13 km east by north-east of Saint-Lô and 20 km south-west of Bayeux. The southern tip of the commune is the departmental border with Manche. Access to the commune is by the D229 from Litteau in the west which passes through the commune and the village and continues west to join the D28 south of Balleroy. The D122B from Litteau passes through the south of the commune and goes east then south towards Montrabot. The D122 road forms the whole western border of the commune. Apart from the village there are the hamlets of La Nellerie, Le Mesnil, La Londe, and Promenant. The commune is entirely farmland.

The Drôme river forms the eastern border of the commune as it flows north to join the Aure just north of Maisons. Several streams, including the Ruisseau de la Bindoure, flow through the commune and join the Drome.

== Toponymy ==
La Bazoque appears as La Bazoque on the 1750 Cassini Map and the same on the 1790 version.

== Administration ==
List of Successive Mayors

From	To	Name
1995	2020	Gilbert Le Bourgeois
2020	2026	Francis Corbeaux

== Demography ==
Historical population

Year	Pop.	±% p.a.
1793	540	—
1821	481	−0.41%
1846	432	−0.43%
1872	409	−0.21%
1901	337	−0.67%
1926	294	−0.54%
1946	301	+0.12%
1954	280	−0.90%
1962	224	−2.75%

Year	Pop.	±% p.a.
1968	193	−2.45%
1975	158	−2.82%
1982	157	−0.09%
1990	143	−1.16%
1999	153	+0.75%
2007	172	+1.47%
2012	162	−1.19%
2017	183	+2.47%
2023	193	+0.89%

Source: EHESS and INSEE

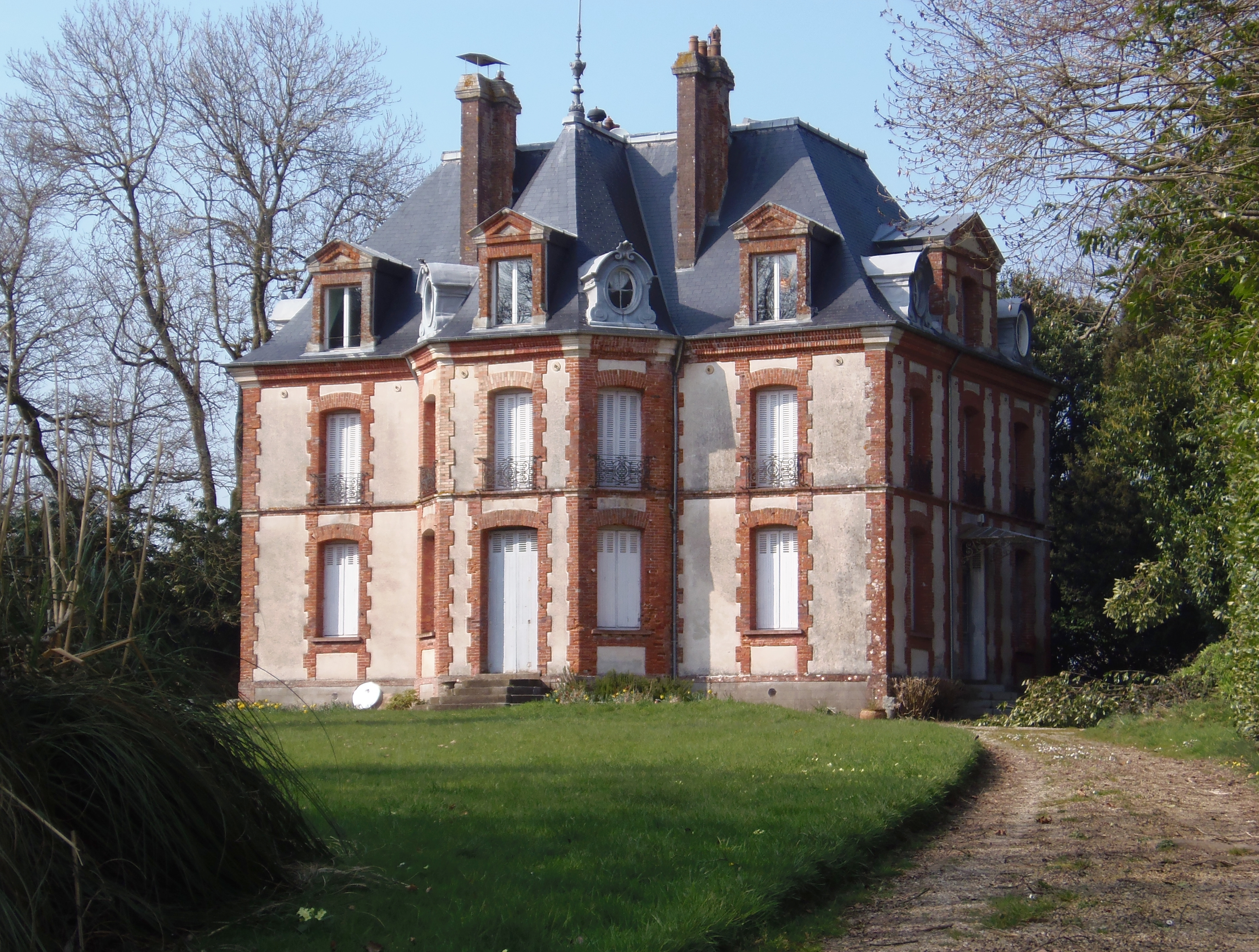
The Chateau near the Quarry

== Sites and monuments ==
- The Trou du Diable: an old slate quarry
- The Circuit of Shale
- The Essarts Mill

== See also ==
- Communes of the Calvados department
