= Castilly =

- Part of Isigny-sur-Mer
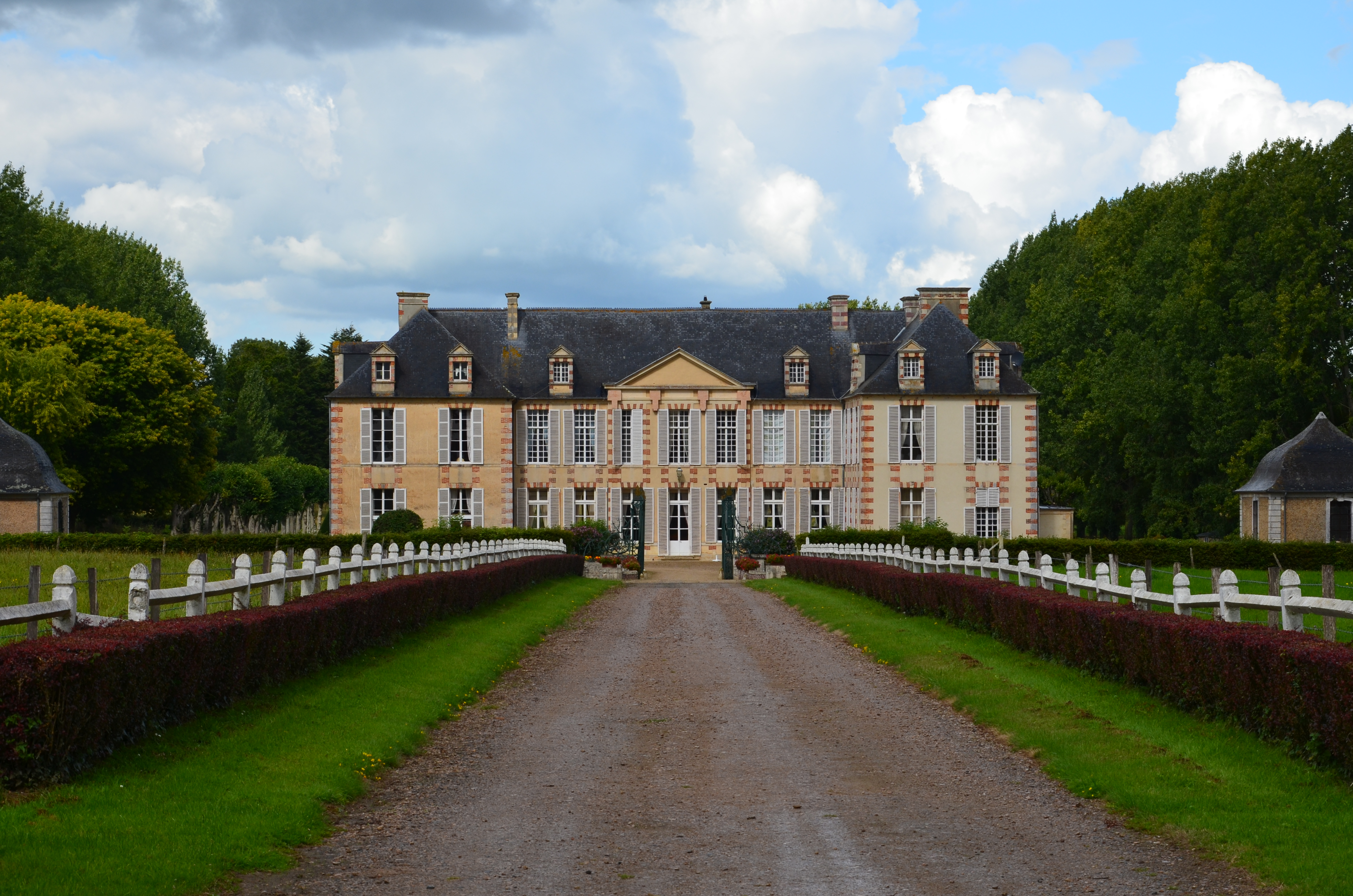
- Location of Castilly
- Location within France Location within Normandy
- Coordinates: 49°16′16″N 1°01′22″W
- Country: France
- Region: Normandy
- Department: Calvados
- Arrondissement: Bayeux
- Canton: Trévières
- Commune: Isigny-sur-Mer
- Area^{1}: 12.2 km^{2} (4.7 sq mi)
- Elevation: 40 m (130 ft)
- Highest elevation: 64 m (210 ft)
- Lowest elevation: 4 m (13 ft)
- Population (2023): 282
  - Density: 23.1/km^{2} (59.9/sq mi)
- Time zone: UTC+01:00 (CET)
  - Summer (DST): UTC+02:00 (CEST)
- Postal code: 14330
- ^{1} French Land Register data, which excludes lakes, ponds, glaciers > 1 km^{2} (0.386 sq mi or 247 acres) and river estuaries.

Castilly (French pronunciation: [kastiji]) is a former commune in the Calvados department in the Normandy region in northwestern France. On 1 January 2017, it was merged into the commune Isigny-sur-Mer.

== See also ==
- Communes of the Calvados department
