= Vouilly =

- Part of Isigny-sur-Mer
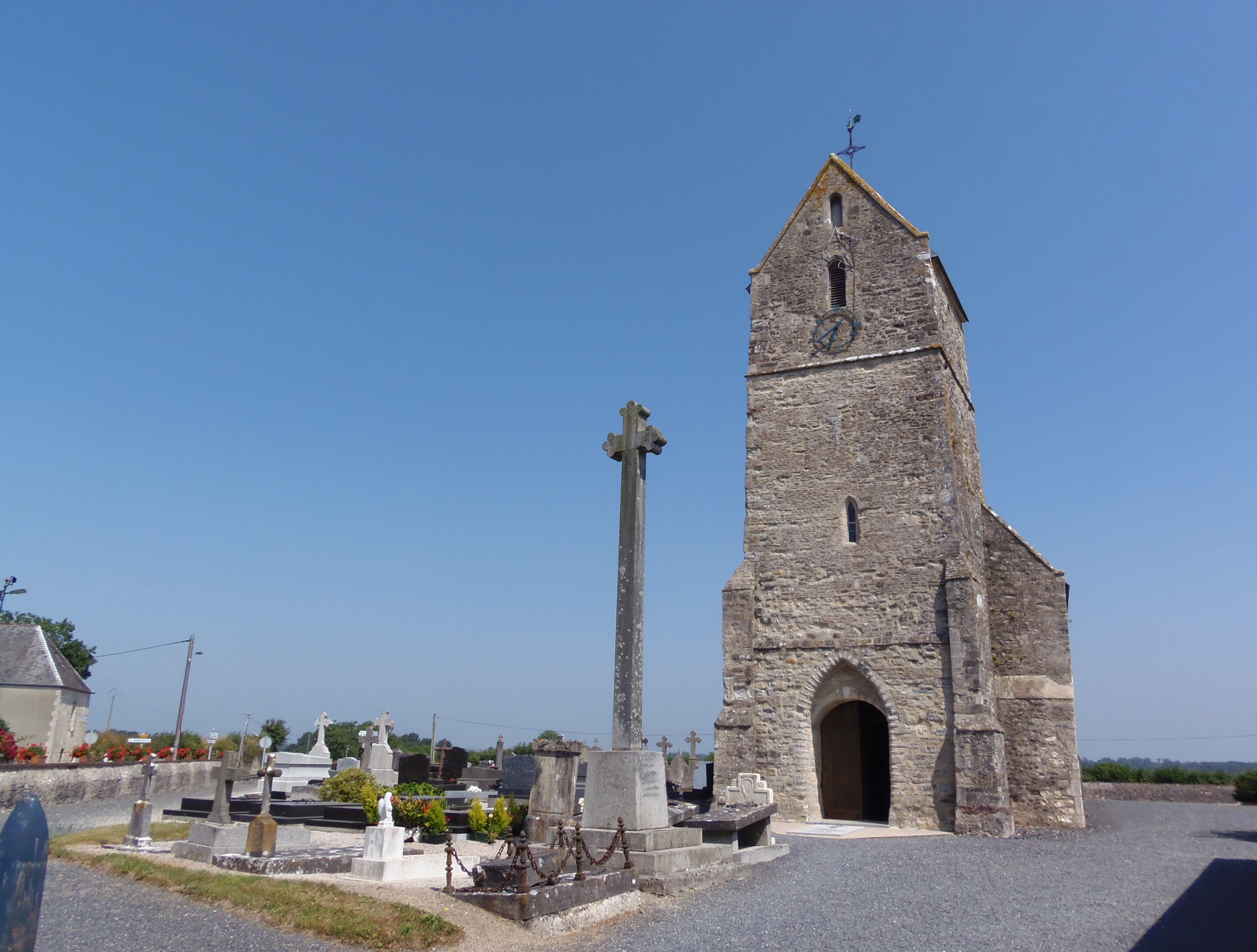
- Vouilly Eglise
- Location of Vouilly
- Location within France Location within Normandy
- Coordinates: 49°17′43″N 1°02′04″W
- Country: France
- Region: Normandy
- Department: Calvados
- Arrondissement: Bayeux
- Canton: Trévières
- Commune: Isigny-sur-Mer
- Area^{1}: 6.33 km^{2} (2.44 sq mi)
- Elevation: 20 m (66 ft)
- Highest elevation: 45 m (148 ft)
- Lowest elevation: 0 m (0 ft)
- Population (2023): 145
  - Density: 22.9/km^{2} (59.3/sq mi)
- Time zone: UTC+01:00 (CET)
  - Summer (DST): UTC+02:00 (CEST)
- Postal code: 14230
- ^{1} French Land Register data, which excludes lakes, ponds, glaciers > 1 km^{2} (0.386 sq mi or 247 acres) and river estuaries.

Vouilly (French pronunciation: [vuji]) is a former commune in the Calvados department in the Normandy region in northwestern France. On 1 January 2017, it merged into the commune of Isigny-sur-Mer.

== See also ==
- Communes of the Calvados department
