= Les Oubeaux =

- Part of Isigny-sur-Mer
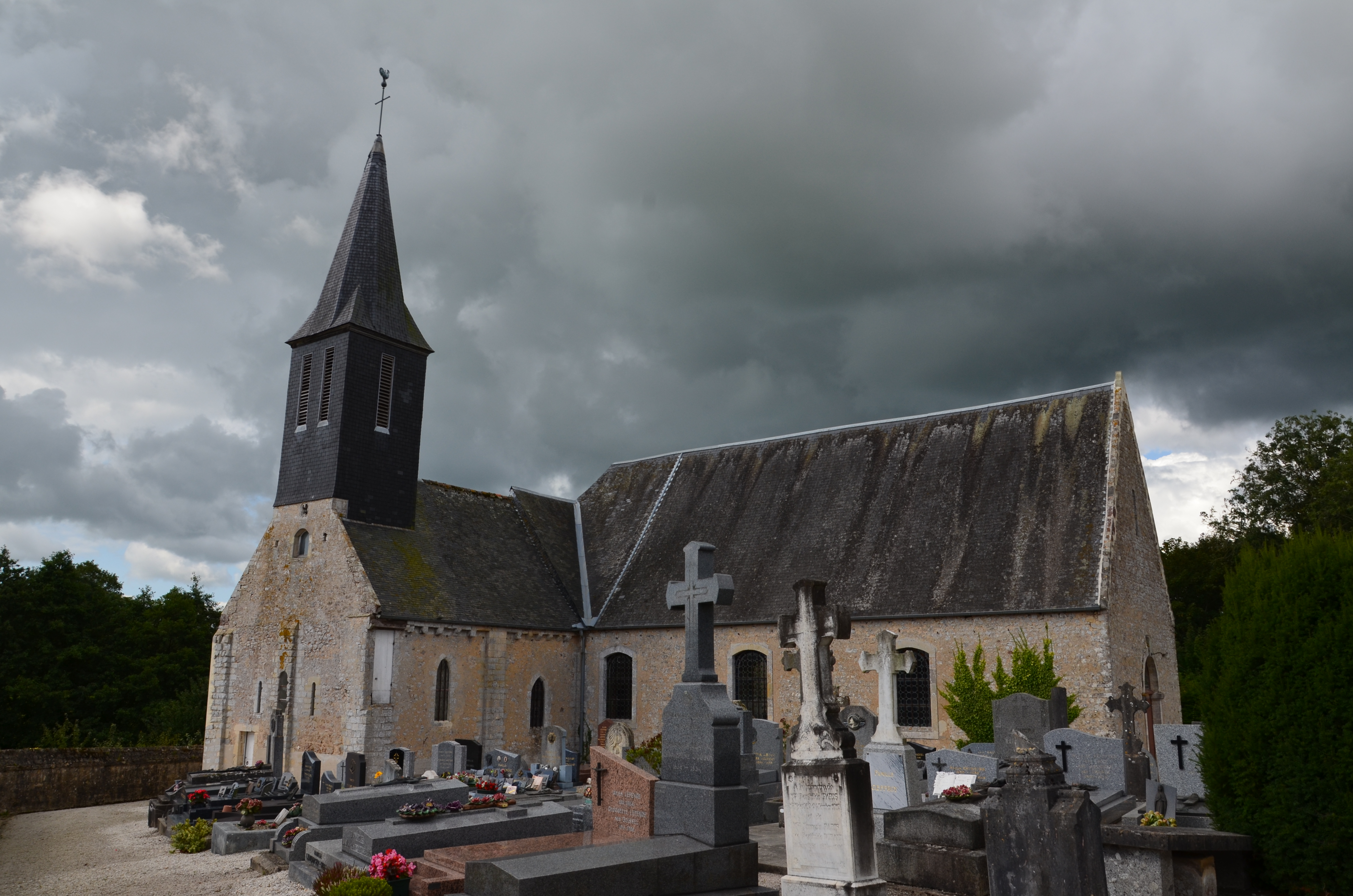
- Location of Les Oubeaux
- Location within France Location within Normandy
- Coordinates: 49°17′14″N 1°03′57″W
- Country: France
- Region: Normandy
- Department: Calvados
- Arrondissement: Bayeux
- Canton: Trévières
- Commune: Isigny-sur-Mer
- Area^{1}: 4.27 km^{2} (1.65 sq mi)
- Elevation: 40 m (130 ft)
- Highest elevation: 47 m (154 ft)
- Lowest elevation: 14 m (46 ft)
- Population (2023): 219
  - Density: 51.3/km^{2} (133/sq mi)
- Time zone: UTC+01:00 (CET)
  - Summer (DST): UTC+02:00 (CEST)
- Postal code: 14230
- ^{1} French Land Register data, which excludes lakes, ponds, glaciers > 1 km^{2} (0.386 sq mi or 247 acres) and river estuaries.

Les Oubeaux (French pronunciation: [le.z‿ubo]) is a former commune in the Calvados department in the Normandy region in northwestern France. On 1 January 2017, it was merged into the commune Isigny-sur-Mer.

== See also ==
- Communes of the Calvados department
