= Trévières =

- Commune
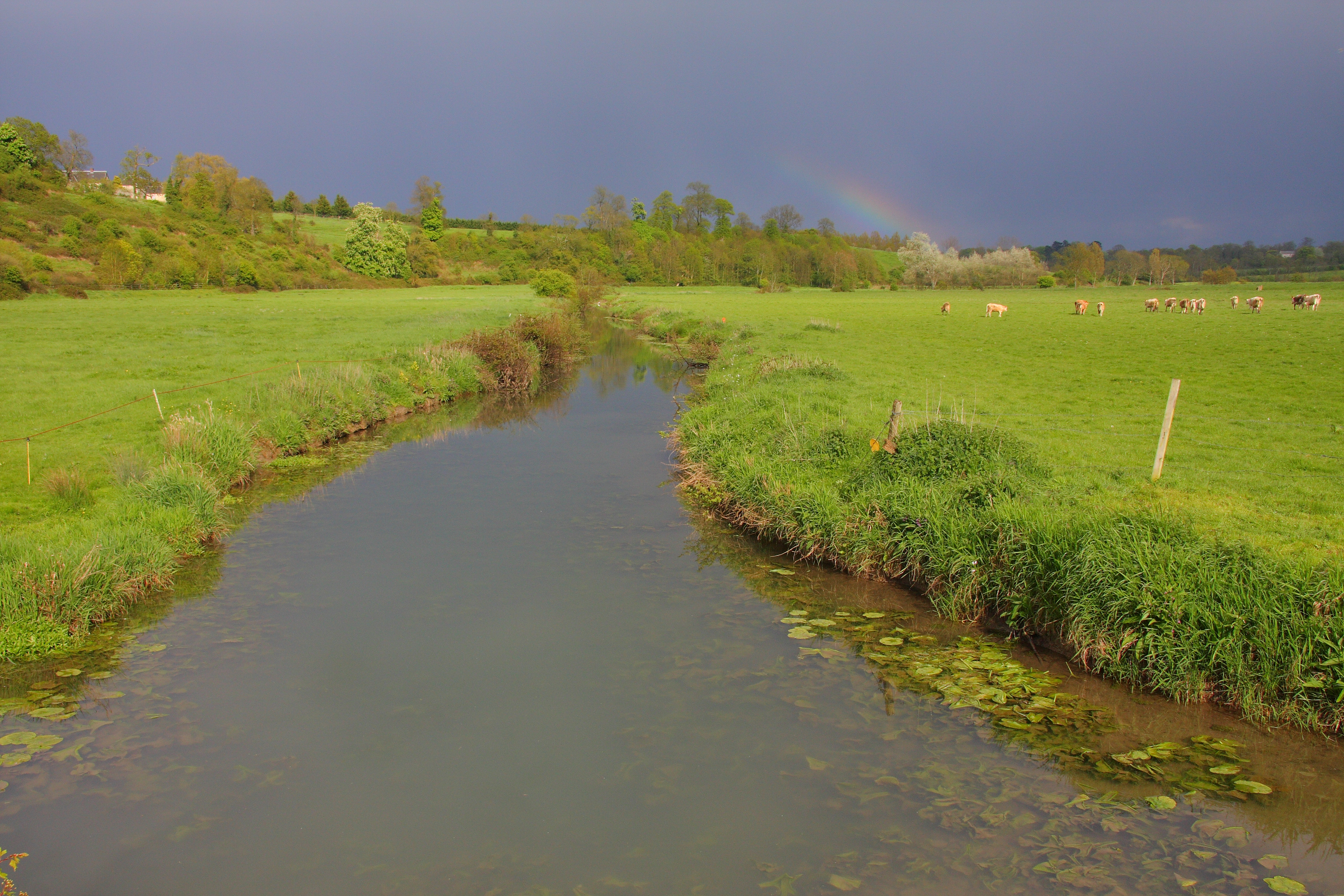
- Aure River

- Coat of arms
- Location of Trévières
- Location within France Location within Normandy
- Coordinates: 49°18′33″N 0°54′11″W
- Country: France
- Region: Normandy
- Department: Calvados
- Arrondissement: Bayeux
- Canton: Trévières
- Intercommunality: CC Isigny-Omaha Intercom

Government
  - Mayor (2020–2026): Mireille Dufour
- Area^{1}: 11.7 km^{2} (4.5 sq mi)
- Elevation: 14 m (46 ft)
- Highest elevation: 46 m (151 ft)
- Lowest elevation: 0 m (0 ft)
- Population (2023): 925
  - Density: 79.1/km^{2} (205/sq mi)
- Time zone: UTC+01:00 (CET)
  - Summer (DST): UTC+02:00 (CEST)
- INSEE/Postal code: 14711 /14710
- ^{1} French Land Register data, which excludes lakes, ponds, glaciers > 1 km^{2} (0.386 sq mi or 247 acres) and river estuaries.

Trévières (French pronunciation: [tʁevjɛʁ]) is a commune in the Calvados department in the Normandy region in northwestern France.

== Administration ==
Trévières is the seat of the canton of Trévières which contains 59 communes. Trévières is part of the Communauté de communes Isigny-Omaha Intercom, which contains the same 59 communes and has its seat in Le Molay-Littry.

== Population ==
Historical population
| Year | Pop. | ±% p.a. |
|---|---|---|
| 1968 | 824 | — |
| 1975 | 806 | −0.32% |
| 1982 | 844 | +0.66% |
| 1990 | 889 | +0.65% |
| 1999 | 905 | +0.20% |
| 2007 | 943 | +0.52% |
| 2012 | 937 | −0.13% |
| 2017 | 924 | −0.28% |
| 2023 | 925 | +0.02% |
Source: INSEE

== Personalities ==
- Octave Mirbeau, writer, born in 1848

== Twin towns ==
- Stokeinteignhead, Devon, England

== See also ==
- Communes of the Calvados department
