= Onffroy de Verez family =

The Onffroy de Vérez family comes from Saint-Laurent-sur-Mer in Calvados in department of Normandy region.

== History ==
This French family was ennobled in January 1543, registered in the Chambre des Comptes on December 16, 1544. Maintained noble on March 9, 1599. Registration of titles of nobility in Santo Domingo in 1768. It was admitted to the Association d'entraide de la noblesse française in 1953.

== Notable people ==
=== Anne-Marthe-Rolland Onffroy de Verez ===
Anne-Marthe-Roland Onffroy, born December 15, 1778, in Brittany, is a knight of the Order of Saint Louis. He was a fervent royalist. He belonged to the royal artillery corps (battalion commander). During the French Revolution, he immigrated to Jamaica with his family

Anne-Marthe-Roland Onffroy owned a coffee plantation in Jamaica. He was an artillery officer engaged in the English Army (Saint-Domingue campaigns).

In 1816, after the departure of Napoléon Bonaparte, the Onffroy family returned to Brittany after selling the Jamaican coffee plantation.

=== Jules-Henry Onffroy de Vérez ===
Jules-Henry Onffroy de Thoron was a 19th-century French explorer. He is the son of Anne-Marthe-Rolland Onffroy de Verez. He recounted his travels under the name Onffroy de Thoron (Don Enrique).

In 1850, he set sail for South America without a specific destination, landing at Valparaíso then in 1851 at La Serena. He took part in battles against the Chileans and was expelled as undesirable. Moving to Peru, he obtained the title of "civil engineer" from the Ministry of War. However, his desire to travel persisted. He undertook two expeditions (1852 and 1861) to Peru, devoting his time to observing, drawing and establishing topographical surveys of the region.
