= La Cambe =

- Commune
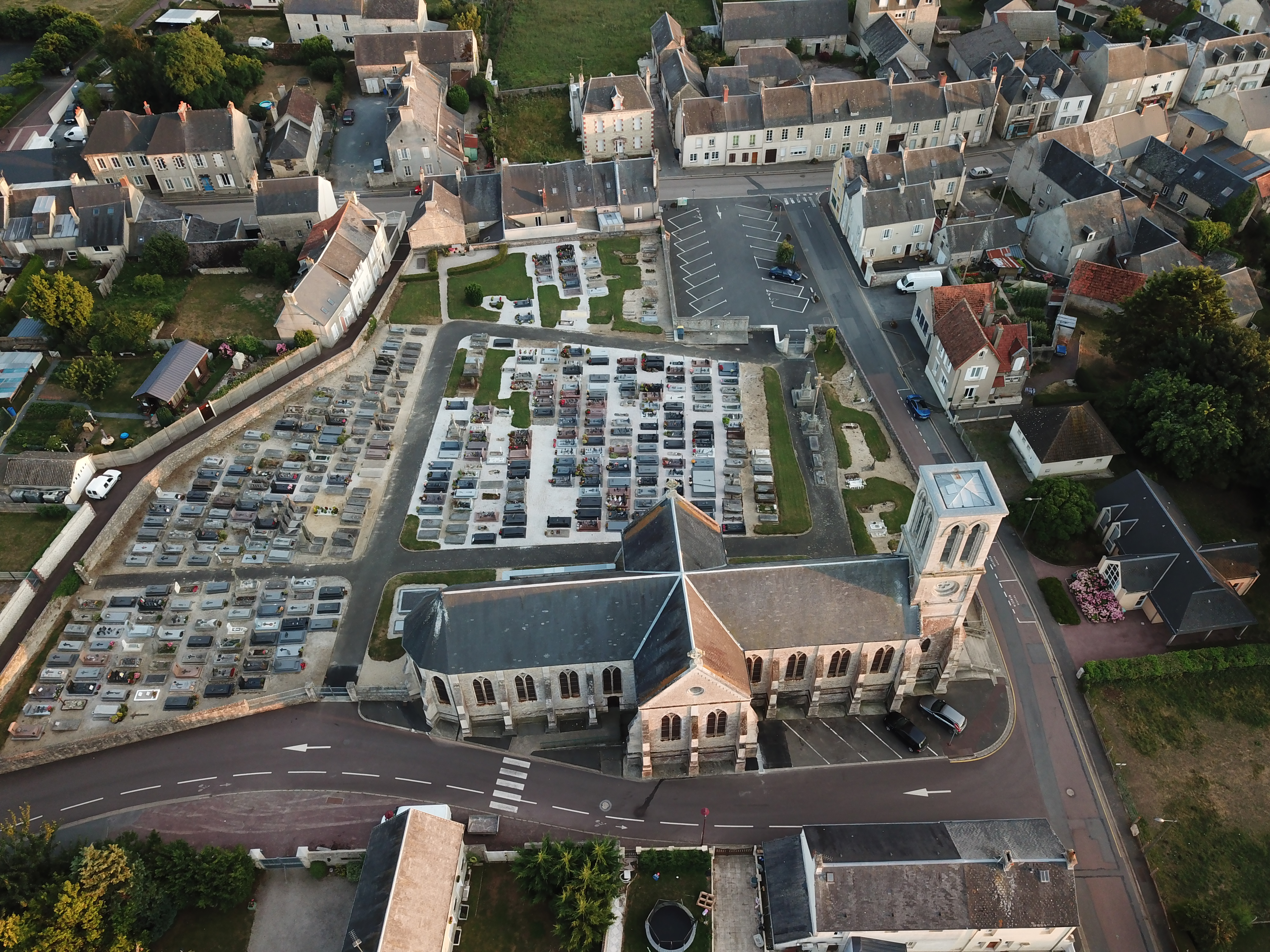
- Church of La Cambe seen from above

- Coat of arms
- Location of La Cambe
- Location within France Location within Normandy
- Coordinates: 49°20′38″N 1°00′15″W
- Country: France
- Region: Normandy
- Department: Calvados
- Arrondissement: Bayeux
- Canton: Trévières
- Intercommunality: CC Isigny-Omaha Intercom

Government
  - Mayor (2020–2026): Bernard Lenice
- Area^{1}: 11.17 km^{2} (4.31 sq mi)
- Elevation: 38 m (125 ft)
- Highest elevation: 39 m (128 ft)
- Lowest elevation: 0 m (0 ft)
- Population (2023): 548
  - Density: 49.1/km^{2} (127/sq mi)
- Time zone: UTC+01:00 (CET)
  - Summer (DST): UTC+02:00 (CEST)
- INSEE/Postal code: 14124 /14230
- ^{1} French Land Register data, which excludes lakes, ponds, glaciers > 1 km^{2} (0.386 sq mi or 247 acres) and river estuaries.

La Cambe is a commune in the Calvados department in the Normandy region in northwestern France with a population of 548.

== Geography ==
La Cambe is a Calvados commune located in the Bessin, more specifically, in the Marais du Cotentin et du Bessin natural regional park. It is located 7.5 km away from Isigny-sur-Mer and 23 km away from Bayeux. La Cambe is located along the national road N13 that connects Cherbourg and Paris.

== Land Use ==
According to the European database of biophysical occupation, La Cambe's territory is split into four sections. It is made up of 60.9% agricultural land, 30.8% forest, 4.7% urban land and 3.6% heterogenous agricultural zones.

== See also ==
- Communes of the Calvados department
