= Englesqueville-en-Auge =

- Commune
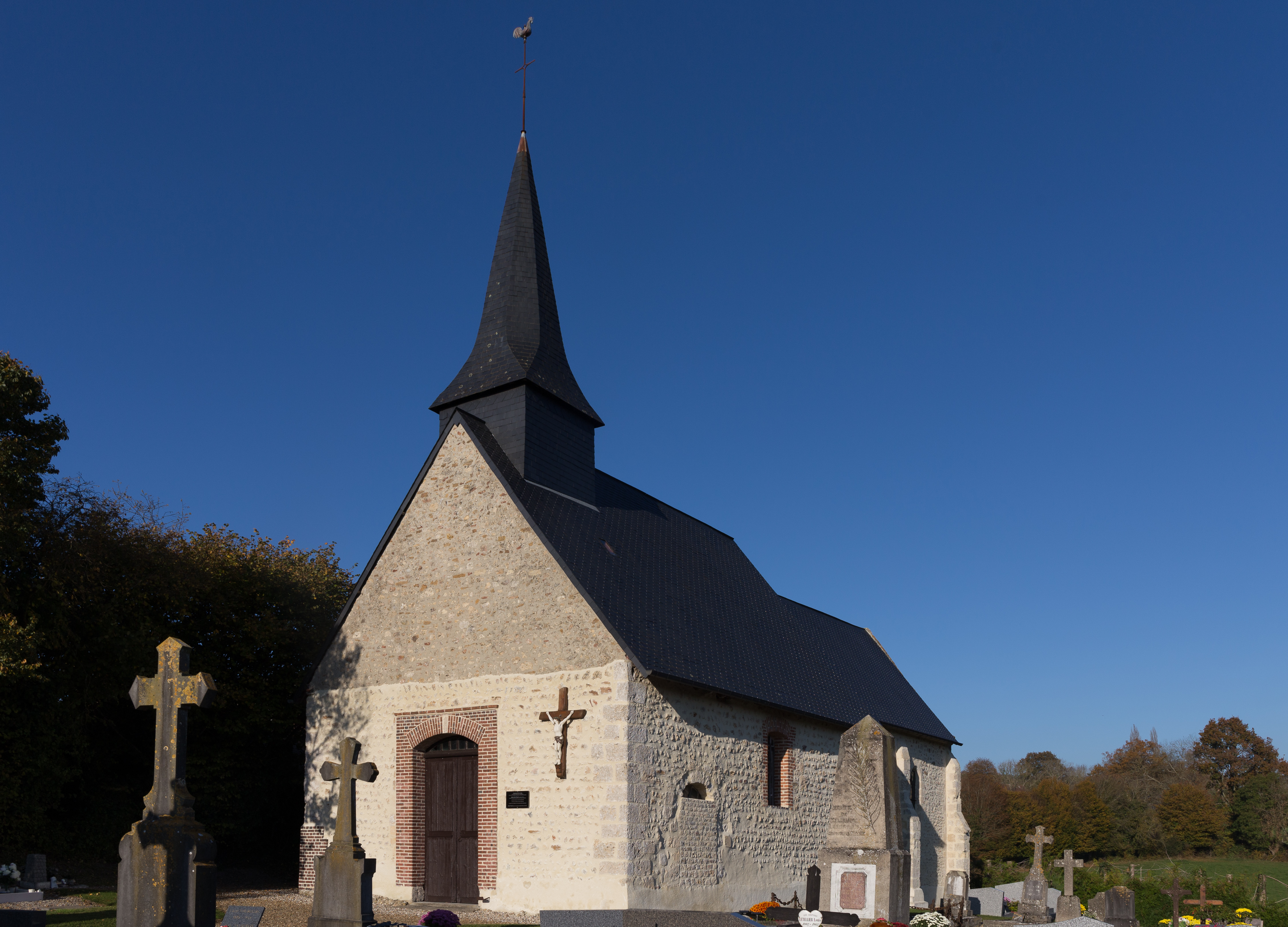
- The church in Englesqueville-en-Auge
- Location of Englesqueville-en-Auge
- Location within France Location within Normandy
- Coordinates: 49°19′59″N 0°08′35″E
- Country: France
- Region: Normandy
- Department: Calvados
- Arrondissement: Lisieux
- Canton: Pont-l'Évêque
- Intercommunality: CC Terre d'Auge

Government
  - Mayor (2020–2026): Gérard Rousselin
- Area^{1}: 3.61 km^{2} (1.39 sq mi)
- Elevation: 40 m (130 ft)
- Highest elevation: 121 m (397 ft)
- Lowest elevation: 15 m (49 ft)
- Population (2023): 113
  - Density: 31.3/km^{2} (81.1/sq mi)
- Time zone: UTC+01:00 (CET)
  - Summer (DST): UTC+02:00 (CEST)
- INSEE/Postal code: 14238 /14800
- ^{1} French Land Register data, which excludes lakes, ponds, glaciers > 1 km^{2} (0.386 sq mi or 247 acres) and river estuaries.

Englesqueville-en-Auge (French pronunciation: [ɑ̃ɡlɛkvil ɑ̃.n‿oʒ], literally Englesqueville in Auge) is a commune in the Calvados department in the Normandy region in northwestern France.

== Population ==
Historical population
Year	Pop.	±% p.a.
1968	65	—
1975	74	+1.87%
1982	82	+1.48%
1990	102	+2.77%
1999	109	+0.74%
2007	110	+0.11%
2012	119	+1.59%
2017	110	−1.56%
2023	113	+0.45%
Source: INSEE

== See also ==
- Englesqueville-la-Percée
- Communes of the Calvados department
