= Operation Curlew =

World War II British Commando raid

Operation Curlew was a British Commando raid against the town of Saint-Laurent-sur-Mer on the Normandy coast of German-occupied northern France on 11/12 January 1942.

Four officers and 11 soldiers of the 15th Battalion of the Welsh Regiment participated in this expedition in two Eureka boats. It was a larger raid compared to smaller sorties in the past.

The objective was to gain some experience and maybe find some intelligence. The team spent an hour ashore.

It was not considered a success from the military point of view, because it did not meet the enemy.
