= Tour-en-Bessin =

- Commune
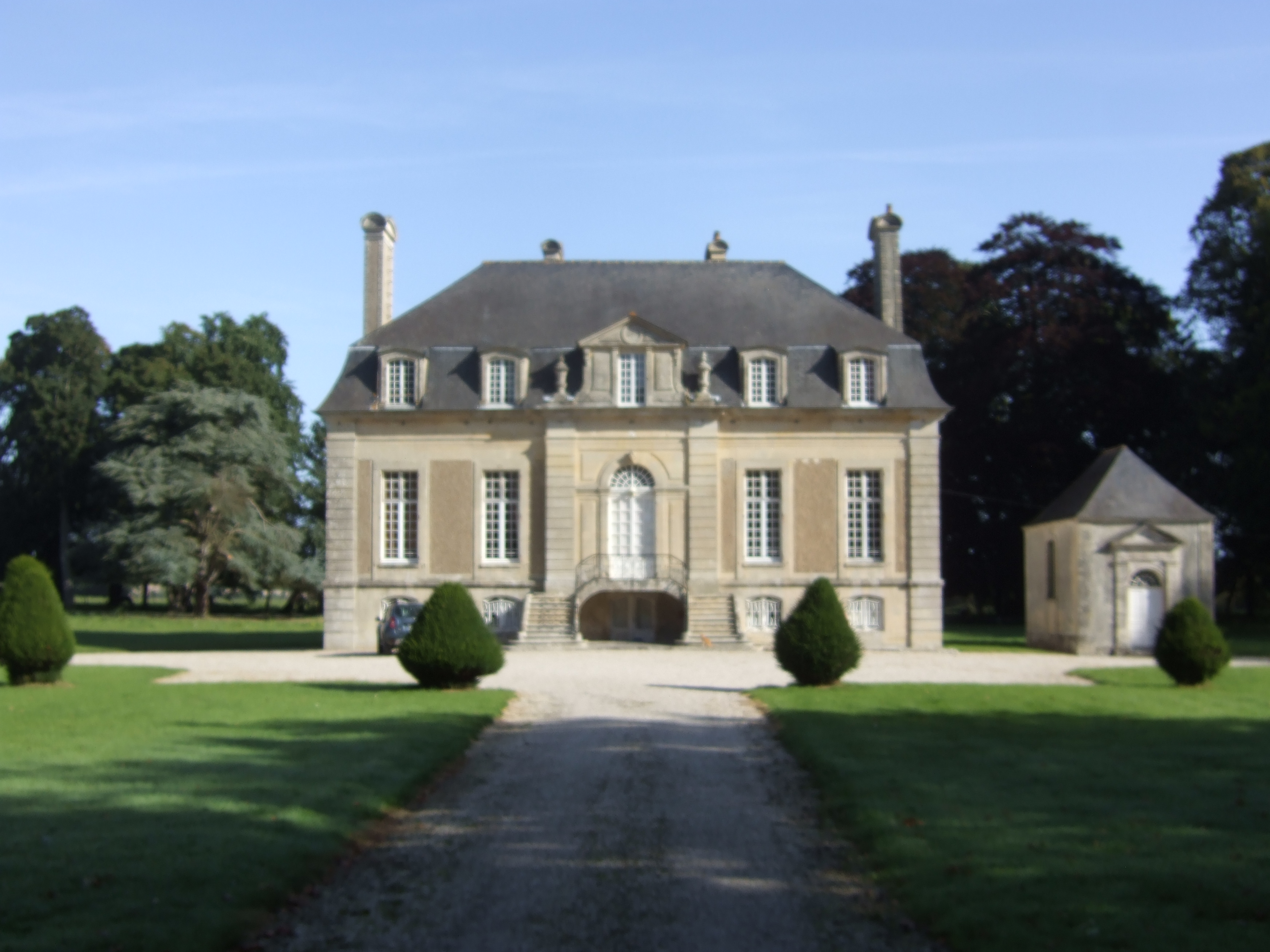
- Chateau of Vaulaville

- Coat of arms
- Location of Tour-en-Bessin
- Location within France Location within Normandy
- Coordinates: 49°17′51″N 0°46′41″W
- Country: France
- Region: Normandy
- Department: Calvados
- Arrondissement: Bayeux
- Canton: Trévières
- Intercommunality: CC Isigny-Omaha Intercom

Government
  - Mayor (2020–2026): Frédéric Renaud
- Area^{1}: 10.31 km^{2} (3.98 sq mi)
- Highest elevation: 77 m (253 ft)
- Lowest elevation: 20 m (66 ft)
- Population (2023): 692
  - Density: 67.1/km^{2} (174/sq mi)
- Time zone: UTC+01:00 (CET)
  - Summer (DST): UTC+02:00 (CEST)
- INSEE/Postal code: 14700 /14400
- ^{1} French Land Register data, which excludes lakes, ponds, glaciers > 1 km^{2} (0.386 sq mi or 247 acres) and river estuaries.

Tour-en-Bessin (French pronunciation: [tuʁ ɑ̃ bɛsɛ̃], literally Tour in Bessin) is a commune in the Calvados department in the Normandy region in northwestern France.

== History ==
=== World War II ===
After the liberation of the area by Allied Forces in 1944, engineers of the Ninth Air Force IX Engineering Command began construction of a combat Advanced Landing Ground outside of the town. Declared operational on 28 July, the airfield was designated as "A-13", it was used by several fighter and bomber units until mid-September. Afterward, the airfield was used for resupply and casualty transport. It was closed in early December.

== Population ==
Historical population
Year	Pop.	±% p.a.
1968	452	—
1975	418	−1.11%
1982	421	+0.10%
1990	512	+2.48%
1999	504	−0.17%
2007	582	+1.81%
2012	596	+0.48%
2017	658	+2.00%
2023	692	+0.84%
Source: INSEE

== See also ==
- Communes of the Calvados department
