= Castillon, Calvados =

Castillon
- Commune
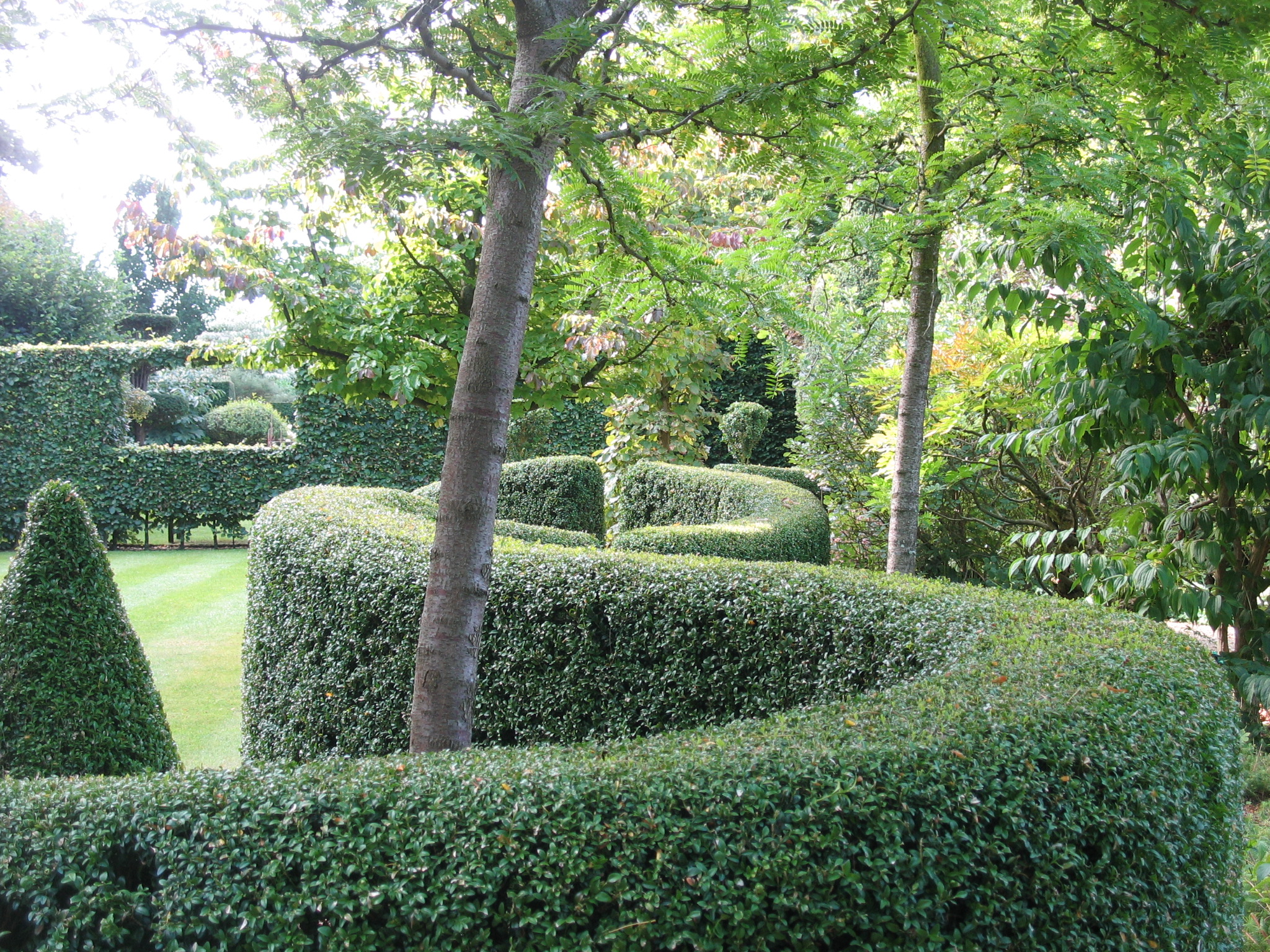
- Castillon-Plantbessin garden

- Coat of arms
- Location of Castillon
- Location within France Location within Normandy
- Coordinates: 49°12′13″N 0°47′45″W
- Country: France
- Region: Normandy
- Department: Calvados
- Arrondissement: Bayeux
- Canton: Trévières
- Intercommunality: CC Isigny-Omaha Intercom

Government
  - Mayor (2020–2026): Alexandre Chicot
- Area^{1}: 11.02 km^{2} (4.25 sq mi)
- Elevation: 50 m (160 ft)
- Highest elevation: 132 m (433 ft)
- Lowest elevation: 39 m (128 ft)
- Population (2023): 368
  - Density: 33.4/km^{2} (86.5/sq mi)
- Time zone: UTC+01:00 (CET)
  - Summer (DST): UTC+02:00 (CEST)
- INSEE/Postal code: 14140 /14490
- ^{1} French Land Register data, which excludes lakes, ponds, glaciers > 1 km^{2} (0.386 sq mi or 247 acres) and river estuaries.

Castillon (French pronunciation: [kastijɔ̃]) is a commune in the Calvados department in the Normandy region in northwestern France.

== Geography ==
=== Climate ===
In 2010, the climate of the commune was a Type 5, according to a CNRS study based on a series of data covering the period 1971–2000. In 2020, Météo-France published a typology of the climates of metropolitan France in which the commune is exposed to an oceanic climate and is in the Normandy (Cotentin, Orne) climatic region, characterized by relatively high rainfall (850 mm/a) and a cool (15.5 °C) and windy summer.

For 1971–2000, the mean annual temperature is 10.5 °C, with an annual temperature range of 11.8 °C. The average annual rainfall total is 832 mm, with 13 days of precipitation in January and 8.2 days in July. For 1991–2020, the average annual temperature observed at the nearest weather station, located in the commune of Balleroy-sur-Drôme, 4 km away per great-circle navigation, is 11.2 °C and the mean annual precipitation total is 924.3 mm. For the future, the municipality's climate parameters estimated for 2050 according to different greenhouse gas emission scenarios can be consulted on a dedicated website published by Météo-France in November 2022.

== Urban planning ==
=== Typology ===
As of 1 January 2024, Castillon is categorised as a rural commune with a very dispersed population, according to the new 7-level municipal density grid defined by INSEE in 2022. It is located outside the urban unit and outside the attraction of cities.

=== Land use ===
The land use of the municipality, as shown by the European biophysical land cover database Corine Land Cover (CLC), is marked by the importance of agricultural land (99.6% in 2018), a proportion identical to that of 1990 (99.6%). The detailed distribution in 2018 is as follows: meadows (48.3%), arable land (31.2%), heterogeneous agricultural areas (20%), forests (0.3%), mines, landfills and construction sites (0.1%). The evolution of the land use of the commune and its infrastructures can be observed on the various cartographic representations of the territory: the Cassini map (18th century), the staff map (1820-1866) and the IGN maps or aerial photos for the current period (1950 to today).

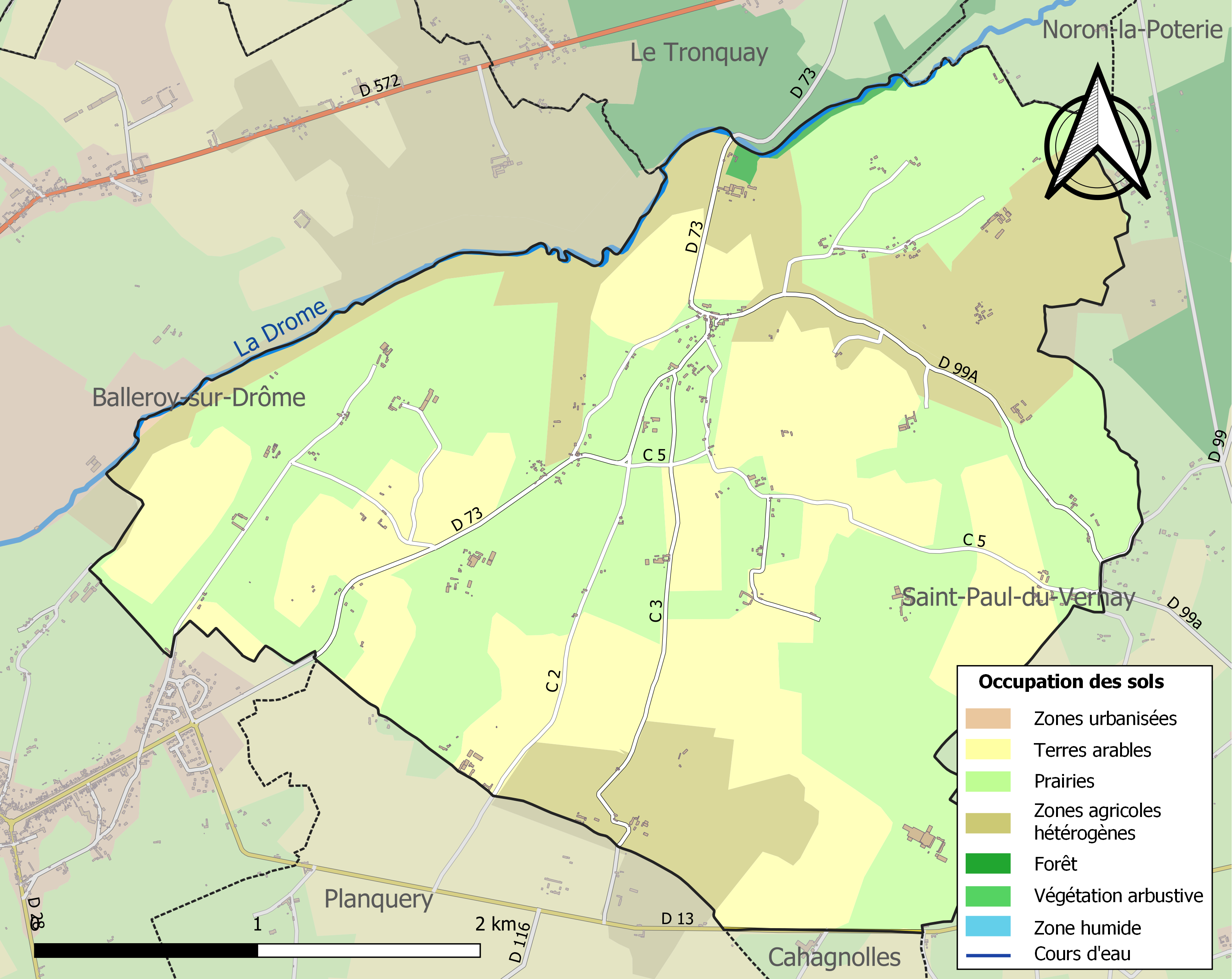
Map of the municipality's infrastructure and land use in 2018 (CLC).

== Population ==
Historical population
| Year | Pop. | ±% p.a. |
|---|---|---|
| 1968 | 325 | — |
| 1975 | 298 | −1.23% |
| 1982 | 294 | −0.19% |
| 1990 | 284 | −0.43% |
| 1999 | 308 | +0.91% |
| 2007 | 293 | −0.62% |
| 2012 | 332 | +2.53% |
| 2017 | 344 | +0.71% |
| 2023 | 368 | +1.13% |
Source: INSEE

== See also ==
- Communes of the Calvados department
