= Le Tronquay, Calvados =

Le Tronquay
- Commune
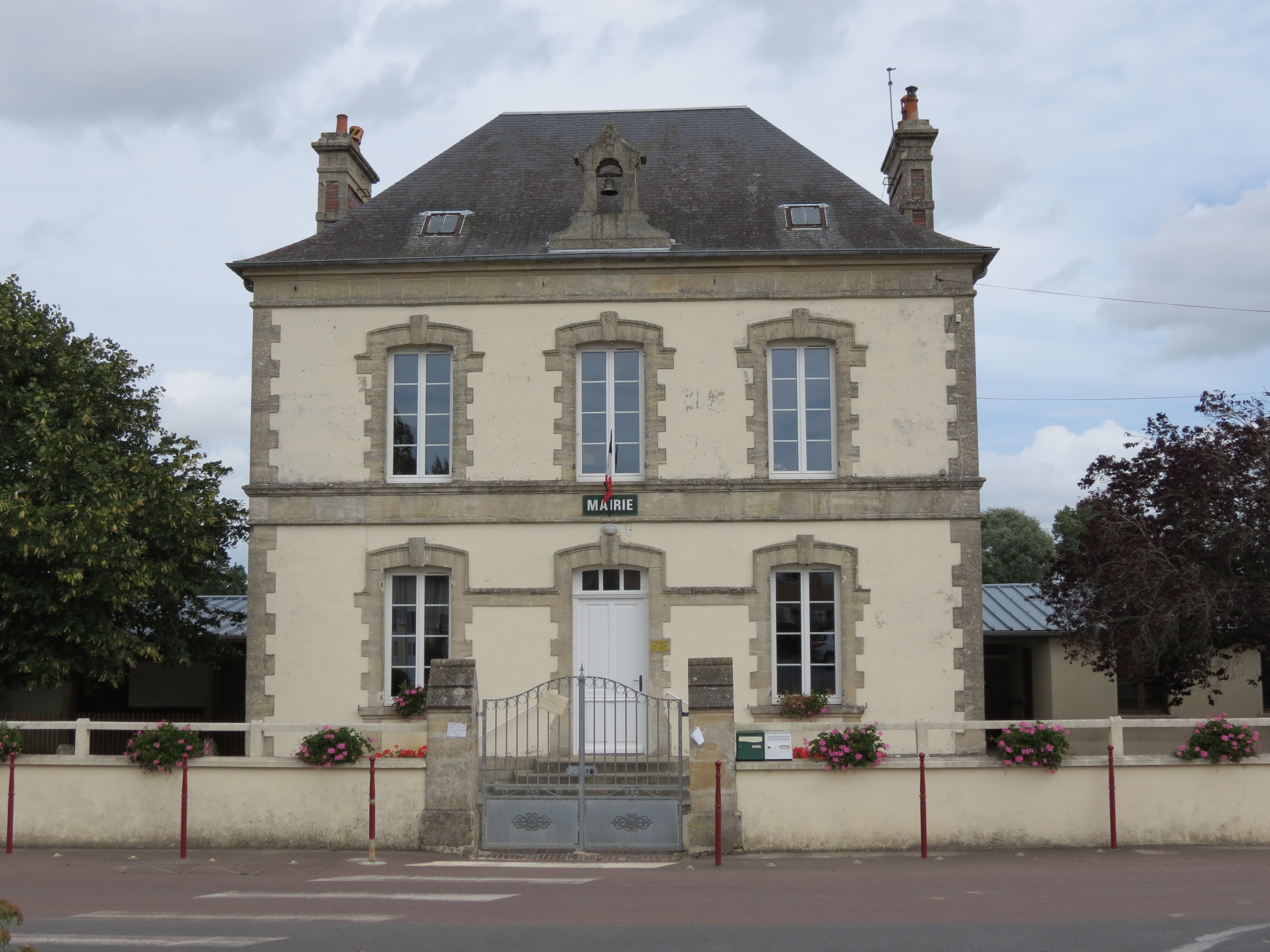
- Town hall

- Coat of arms
- Location of Le Tronquay
- Location within France Location within Normandy
- Coordinates: 49°13′44″N 0°49′20″W
- Country: France
- Region: Normandy
- Department: Calvados
- Arrondissement: Bayeux
- Canton: Trévières
- Intercommunality: CC Isigny-Omaha Intercom

Government
  - Mayor (2020–2026): Patricia Gady-Duquesne
- Area^{1}: 13.07 km^{2} (5.05 sq mi)
- Elevation: 85 m (279 ft)
- Highest elevation: 106 m (348 ft)
- Lowest elevation: 35 m (115 ft)
- Population (2023): 745
  - Density: 57.0/km^{2} (148/sq mi)
- Time zone: UTC+01:00 (CET)
  - Summer (DST): UTC+02:00 (CEST)
- INSEE/Postal code: 14714 /14490
- ^{1} French Land Register data, which excludes lakes, ponds, glaciers > 1 km^{2} (0.386 sq mi or 247 acres) and river estuaries.

Le Tronquay (French pronunciation: [lə tʁɔ̃kɛ]) is a commune in the Calvados department in the Normandy region in northwestern France.

== Population ==
Historical population
Year	Pop.	±% p.a.
1968	593	—
1975	602	+0.22%
1982	623	+0.49%
1990	651	+0.55%
1999	626	−0.43%
2007	740	+2.11%
2012	761	+0.56%
2017	776	+0.39%
2023	745	−0.68%
Source: INSEE

== See also ==
- Communes of the Calvados department
