= Hippolyte Guérin =

French poet

Hippolyte-Louis Guérin de Litteau (French pronunciation: [ipɔlit lwi ɡeʁɛ̃ də lito]; 5 May 1797 – 19 December 1861) was a 19th-century French poet.

== Biography ==
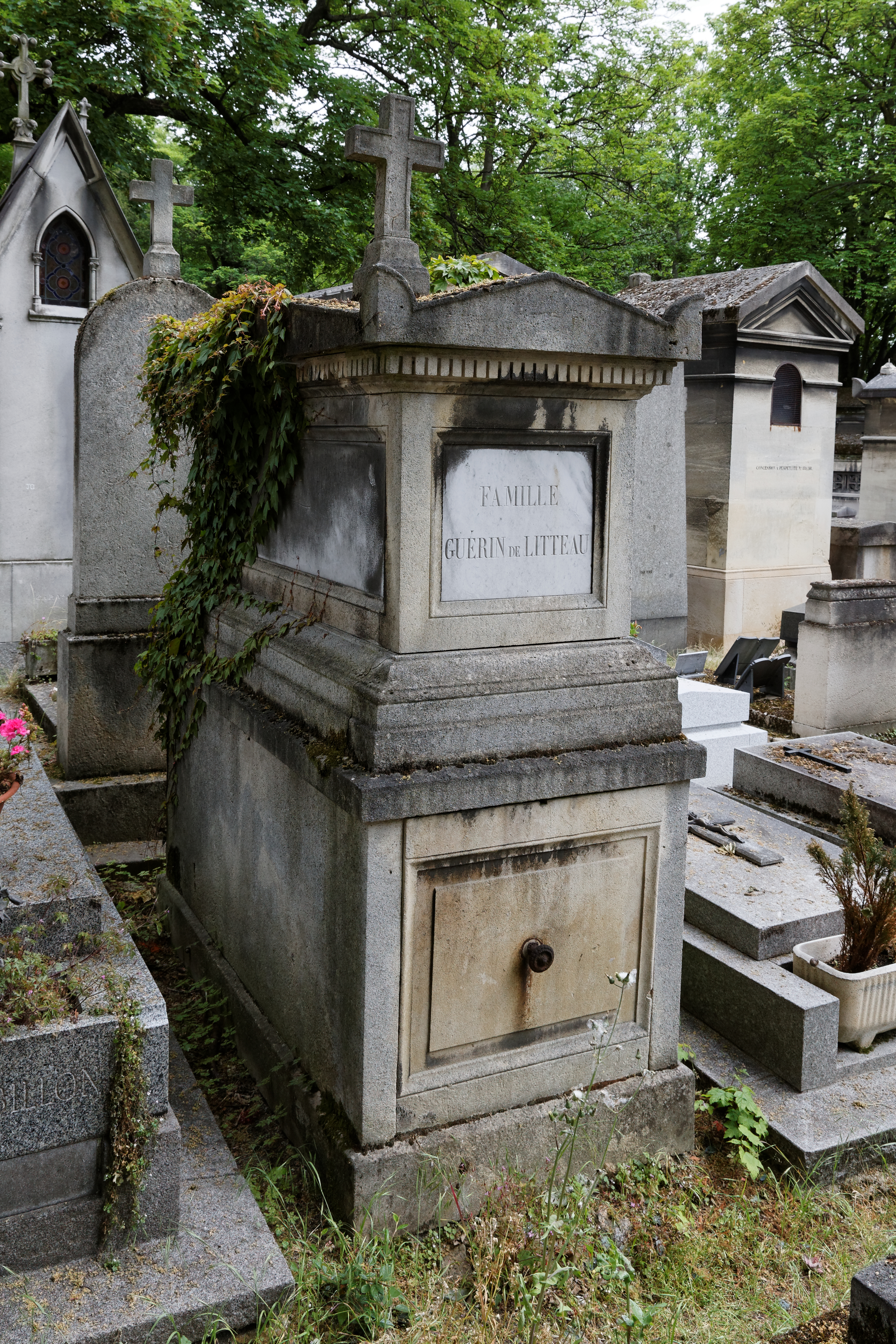
Grave at the Père Lachaise Cemetery

Born in Litteau, Calvados, from a family established since the 17th century in Normandy (descendant of a captain of the bourgeois of the City of Bayeux), born in the castle of Litteau, Guérin was the son of the owner and director of several metallurgical establishments, managing himself the business of the blast furnaces of Montluçon of which he was one of the founders. His activity led him to reside for about twenty years in the Nivernais, in Decize, where he found many sources of inspiration.

From 1843, still on business, Guérin joined Paris.

A well-known writer and appreciated by musicians, his poetry inspired many composers during the Second French Empire and the French Third Republic.

Guérin is buried at the Père Lachaise Cemetery (58th division). His daughter married sculptor Eugène-Louis Lequesne.

His memory is kept by the owners of the castle of Litteau, cradle of the family, and by the Guérin descendants, at the castle of Salornay in Hurigny (Saône-et-Loire).

== Publications ==
- Niverniennes. 1842.
- Le Voyage à Decize. 1842.
- Mélodies. Auguste Fontaine (Paris). 1856.
- Légendes. Librairie centrale (Paris). 1863.
