= Longueville, Calvados =

Longueville
- Commune
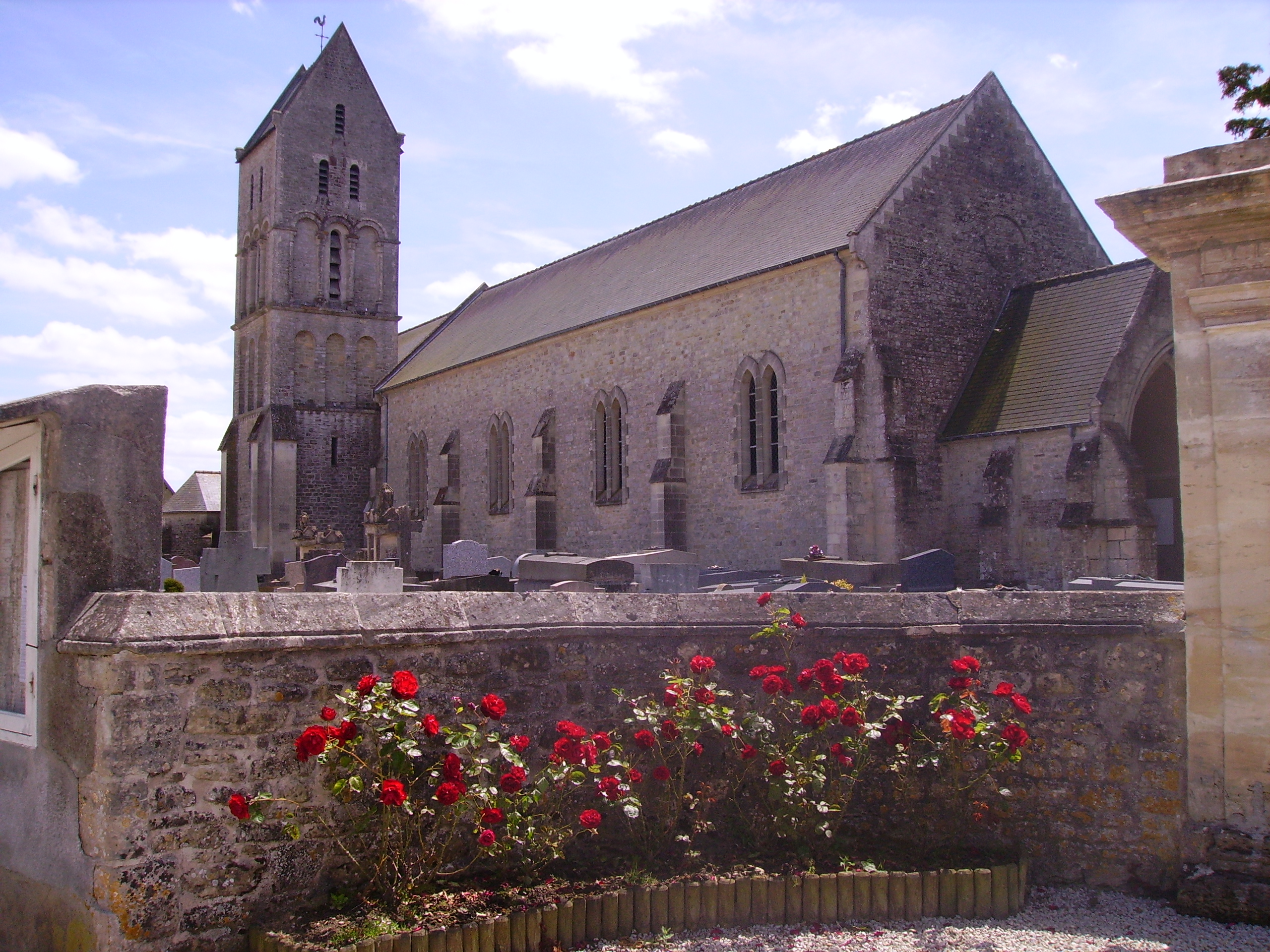
- The church in Longueville
- Location of Longueville
- Location within France Location within Normandy
- Coordinates: 49°20′27″N 0°57′31″W
- Country: France
- Region: Normandy
- Department: Calvados
- Arrondissement: Bayeux
- Canton: Trévières
- Intercommunality: CC Isigny-Omaha Intercom

Government
  - Mayor (2020–2026): Daniel Joret
- Area^{1}: 6.54 km^{2} (2.53 sq mi)
- Highest elevation: 50 m (160 ft)
- Lowest elevation: 0 m (0 ft)
- Population (2023): 295
  - Density: 45.1/km^{2} (117/sq mi)
- Time zone: UTC+01:00 (CET)
  - Summer (DST): UTC+02:00 (CEST)
- INSEE/Postal code: 14378 /14230
- ^{1} French Land Register data, which excludes lakes, ponds, glaciers > 1 km^{2} (0.386 sq mi or 247 acres) and river estuaries.

Longueville (French pronunciation: [lɔ̃ɡvil]) is a commune in the Calvados department in the Normandy region in northwestern France.

== Population ==
Historical population
Year	Pop.	±% p.a.
1968	308	—
1975	272	−1.76%
1982	251	−1.14%
1990	239	−0.61%
1999	237	−0.09%
2007	254	+0.87%
2012	310	+4.07%
2017	279	−2.09%
2023	295	+0.93%
Source: INSEE

== See also ==
- Communes of the Calvados department
