= Étréham =

- Commune
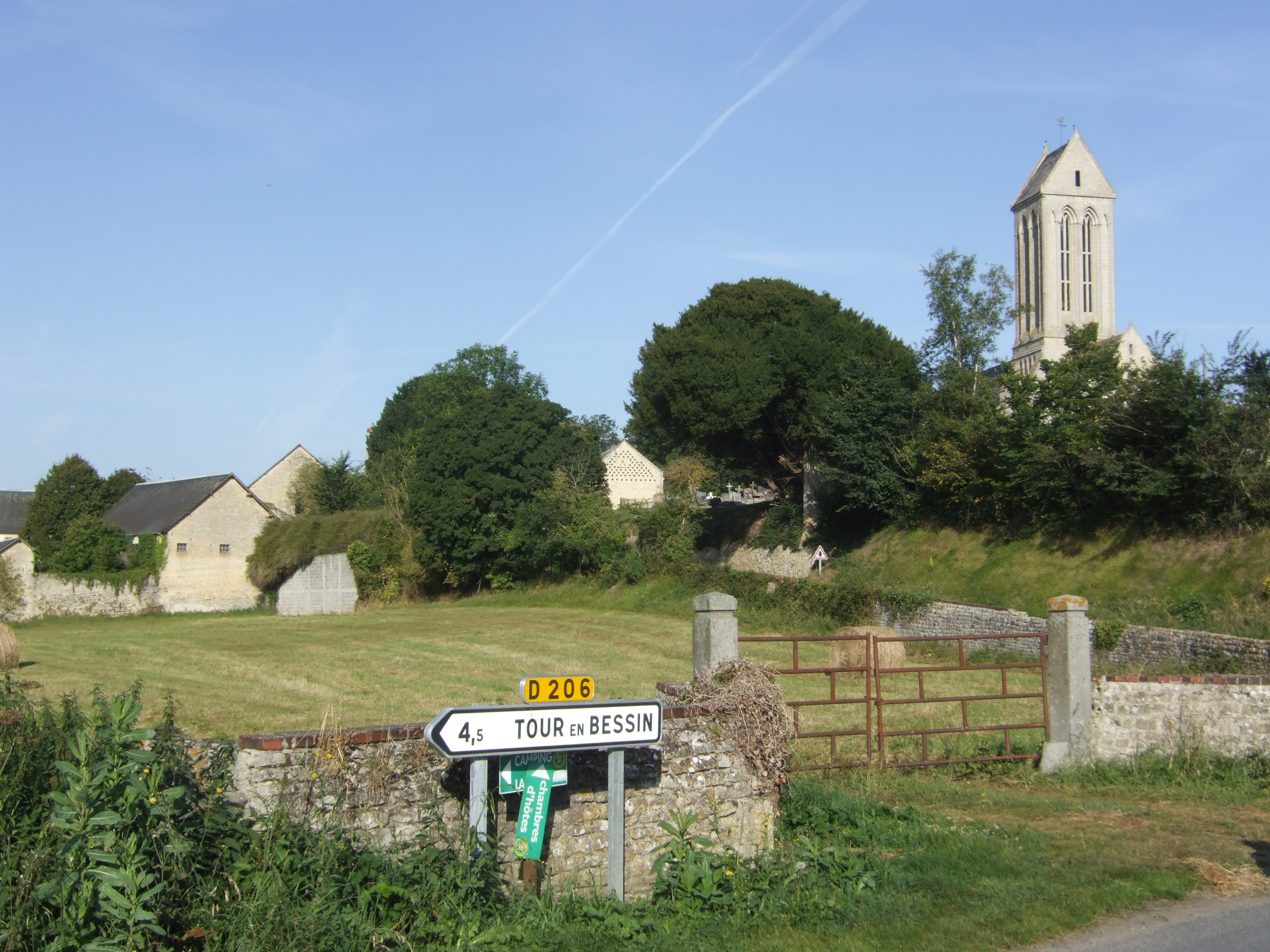
- Farm of the Marguerie and St. Romanus church

- Coat of arms
- Location of Étréham
- Location within France Location within Normandy
- Coordinates: 49°19′22″N 0°47′45″W
- Country: France
- Region: Normandy
- Department: Calvados
- Arrondissement: Bayeux
- Canton: Trévières
- Intercommunality: CC Isigny-Omaha Intercom

Government
  - Mayor (2020–2026): Alain Cornière
- Area^{1}: 4.24 km^{2} (1.64 sq mi)
- Elevation: 37 m (121 ft)
- Highest elevation: 68 m (223 ft)
- Lowest elevation: 12 m (39 ft)
- Population (2023): 324
  - Density: 76.4/km^{2} (198/sq mi)
- Time zone: UTC+01:00 (CET)
  - Summer (DST): UTC+02:00 (CEST)
- INSEE/Postal code: 14256 /14400
- ^{1} French Land Register data, which excludes lakes, ponds, glaciers > 1 km^{2} (0.386 sq mi or 247 acres) and river estuaries.

Étréham (French pronunciation: [etʁeɑ̃]) is a commune in the Calvados department in the Normandy region in northwestern France.

== Toponymy ==
Oesterham in 1350.

Probably Old Saxon *wester or Old English westre related to "west" (Old High German westar, west-; see Westerham, Kent) and hām "home, hamlet" or, less probably, Old Saxon ōstar related to "east" (see Ouistreham). This place name corresponds to Saxon settlements in Bayeux and in the surrounding Bessin Region (the so-called Otlinga Saxonia) in the 5th - 6th century or to Anglo-Scandinavian settlements later in the 10th.

== History ==
=== World War II ===
The village was bombed on 8 June 1944, two days after the D-Day landings, by the Big Red One (U.S. First Division). It was liberated one day later, and about 600 German soldiers were taken prisoner. After the liberation, the Allies used the place called Mont Cauvin in the same commune to store their oil until the conquest of Cherbourg.

== Population ==
Historical population
Year	Pop.	±% p.a.
1968	202	—
1975	187	−1.10%
1982	225	+2.68%
1990	236	+0.60%
1999	233	−0.14%
2007	256	+1.18%
2012	291	+2.60%
2017	349	+3.70%
2023	324	−1.23%
Source: INSEE

== See also ==
- Communes of the Calvados department
