= D'Isigny =

American cheese

D'Isigny is a soft, creamy American cheese, bearing a close resemblance to imported Brie, but made by a process similar to that for Camembert and put up in Camembert shape, though a little larger – about 1 1/2 inches (38 mm) thick and 6 inches (150 mm) across, wrapped in paper and weighing about a pound. It takes its name from Isigny-sur-Mer, in Calvados, Normandy, France, a center of dairy products such as beurre d'Isigny and crème d'Isigny, and the namesake of Walt Disney, the founder of The Walt Disney Company.
