= Englesqueville-la-Percée =

- Commune
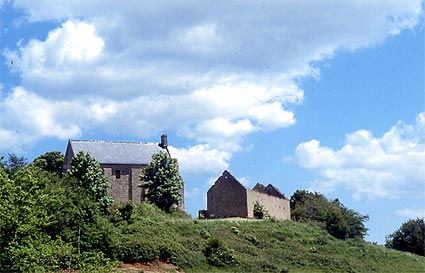
- Chateau of Beaumont-le-Richard
- Location of Englesqueville-la-Percée
- Location within France Location within Normandy
- Coordinates: 49°22′36″N 0°57′02″W
- Country: France
- Region: Normandy
- Department: Calvados
- Arrondissement: Bayeux
- Canton: Trévières
- Intercommunality: CC Isigny-Omaha Intercom

Government
  - Mayor (2020–2026): Dominique Legrand
- Area^{1}: 7.88 km^{2} (3.04 sq mi)
- Elevation: 30 m (98 ft)
- Highest elevation: 42 m (138 ft)
- Lowest elevation: 0 m (0 ft)
- Population (2023): 92
  - Density: 12/km^{2} (30/sq mi)
- Time zone: UTC+01:00 (CET)
  - Summer (DST): UTC+02:00 (CEST)
- INSEE/Postal code: 14239 /14710
- ^{1} French Land Register data, which excludes lakes, ponds, glaciers > 1 km^{2} (0.386 sq mi or 247 acres) and river estuaries.

Englesqueville-la-Percée is a commune in the Calvados department in the Normandy region in northwestern France.

== Population ==
Historical population
Year	Pop.	±% p.a.
1968	180	—
1975	158	−1.85%
1982	121	−3.74%
1990	125	+0.41%
1999	97	−2.78%
2007	93	−0.53%
2012	83	−2.25%
2017	104	+4.61%
2023	92	−2.02%
Source: INSEE

== See also ==
- Englesqueville-en-Auge
- Communes of the Calvados department
