= Cartigny-l'Épinay =

- Commune
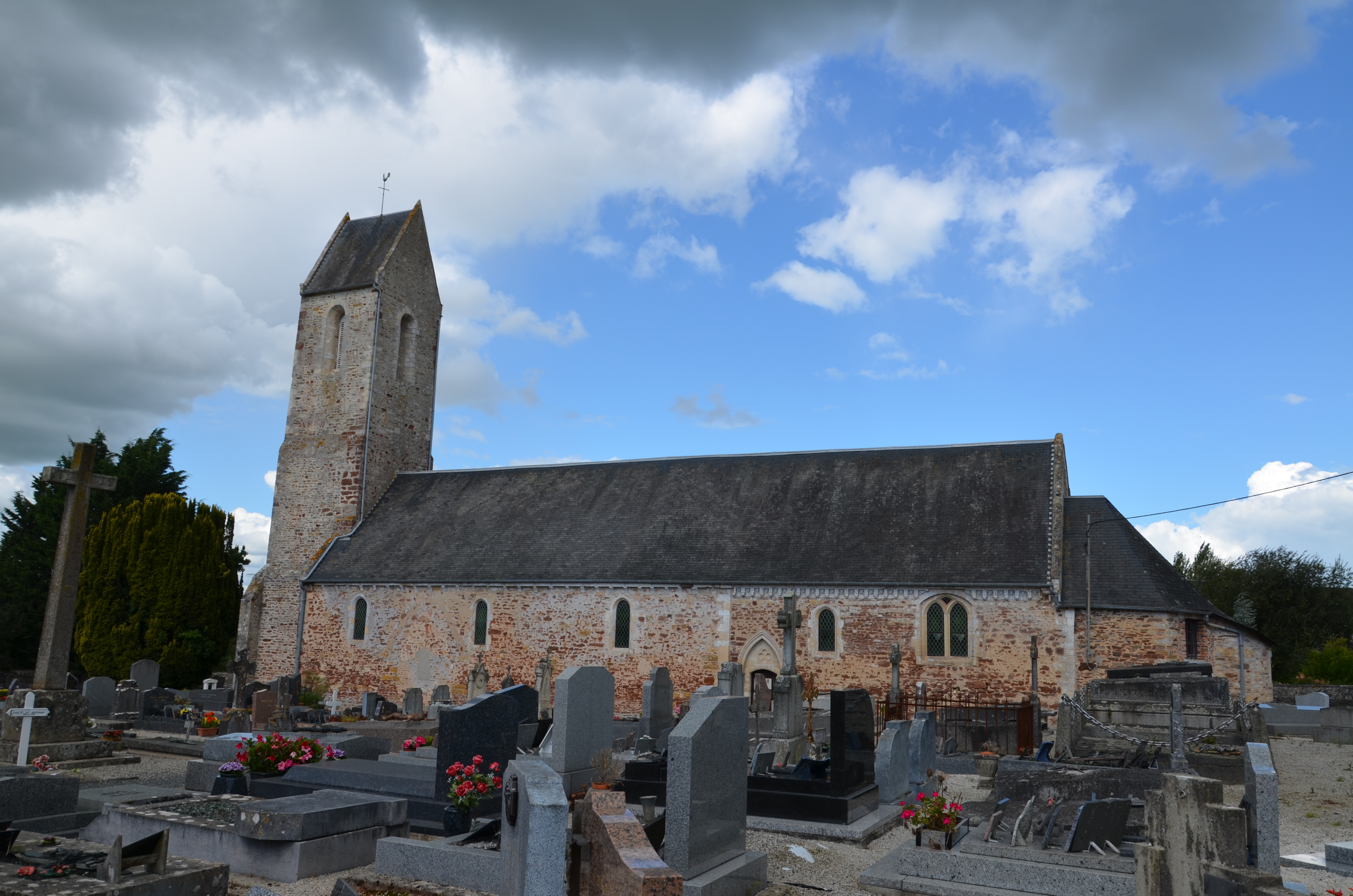
- The church in Cartigny-l'Épinay
- Location of Cartigny-l'Épinay
- Location within France Location within Normandy
- Coordinates: 49°14′25″N 1°00′28″W
- Country: France
- Region: Normandy
- Department: Calvados
- Arrondissement: Bayeux
- Canton: Trévières
- Intercommunality: CC Isigny-Omaha Intercom

Government
  - Mayor (2020–2026): Nelly Suret
- Area^{1}: 10.23 km^{2} (3.95 sq mi)
- Elevation: 30 m (98 ft)
- Highest elevation: 66 m (217 ft)
- Lowest elevation: 7 m (23 ft)
- Population (2023): 300
  - Density: 29/km^{2} (76/sq mi)
- Time zone: UTC+01:00 (CET)
  - Summer (DST): UTC+02:00 (CEST)
- INSEE/Postal code: 14138 /14330
- ^{1} French Land Register data, which excludes lakes, ponds, glaciers > 1 km^{2} (0.386 sq mi or 247 acres) and river estuaries.

Cartigny-l'Épinay (French pronunciation: [kaʁtiɲi lepinɛ]) is a commune in the Calvados department in the Normandy region in northwestern France.

== Population ==
Historical population
Year	Pop.	±% p.a.
1968	382	—
1975	303	−3.26%
1982	263	−2.00%
1990	273	+0.47%
1999	279	+0.24%
2007	295	+0.70%
2012	311	+1.06%
2017	298	−0.85%
2023	300	+0.11%
Source: INSEE

== See also ==
- Communes of the Calvados department
