= Planquery =

- Commune
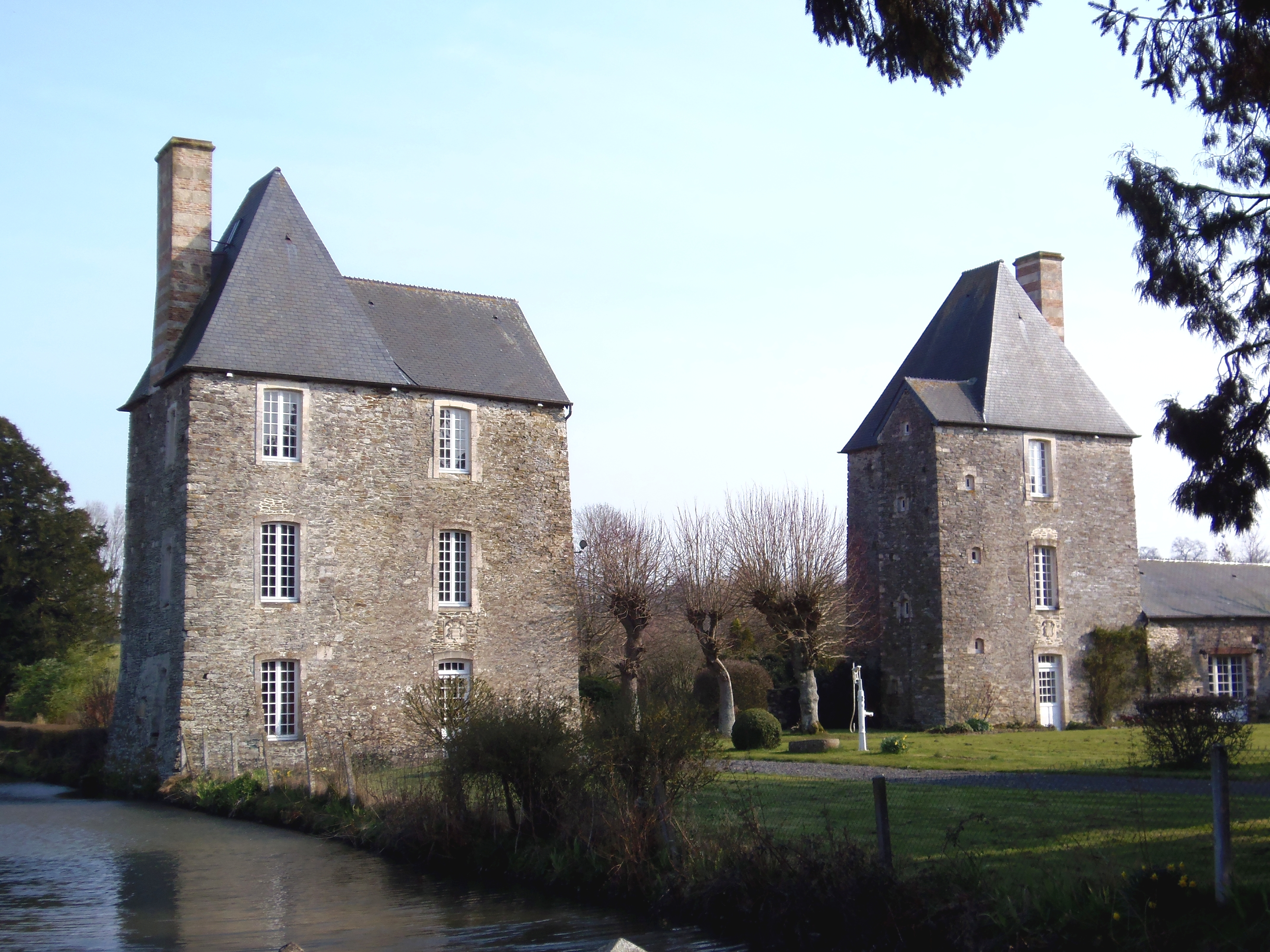
- The chateau in Planquery
- Location of Planquery
- Location within France Location within Normandy
- Coordinates: 49°09′23″N 0°50′14″W
- Country: France
- Region: Normandy
- Department: Calvados
- Arrondissement: Bayeux
- Canton: Trévières
- Intercommunality: CC Isigny-Omaha Intercom

Government
  - Mayor (2020–2026): Jean Martin
- Area^{1}: 14.37 km^{2} (5.55 sq mi)
- Elevation: 132 m (433 ft)
- Highest elevation: 143 m (469 ft)
- Lowest elevation: 60 m (200 ft)
- Population (2023): 249
  - Density: 17.3/km^{2} (44.9/sq mi)
- Time zone: UTC+01:00 (CET)
  - Summer (DST): UTC+02:00 (CEST)
- INSEE/Postal code: 14506 /14490
- ^{1} French Land Register data, which excludes lakes, ponds, glaciers > 1 km^{2} (0.386 sq mi or 247 acres) and river estuaries.

Planquery (French pronunciation: [plɑ̃kʁi]) is a commune in the Calvados department in the Normandy region in northwestern France.

== Population ==
Historical population
Year	Pop.	±% p.a.
1968	277	—
1975	251	−1.40%
1982	217	−2.06%
1990	255	+2.04%
1999	241	−0.63%
2007	225	−0.86%
2012	209	−1.46%
2017	241	+2.89%
2023	249	+0.55%
Source: INSEE

== See also ==
- Communes of the Calvados department
