= Maisons, Calvados =

Maisons
- Commune
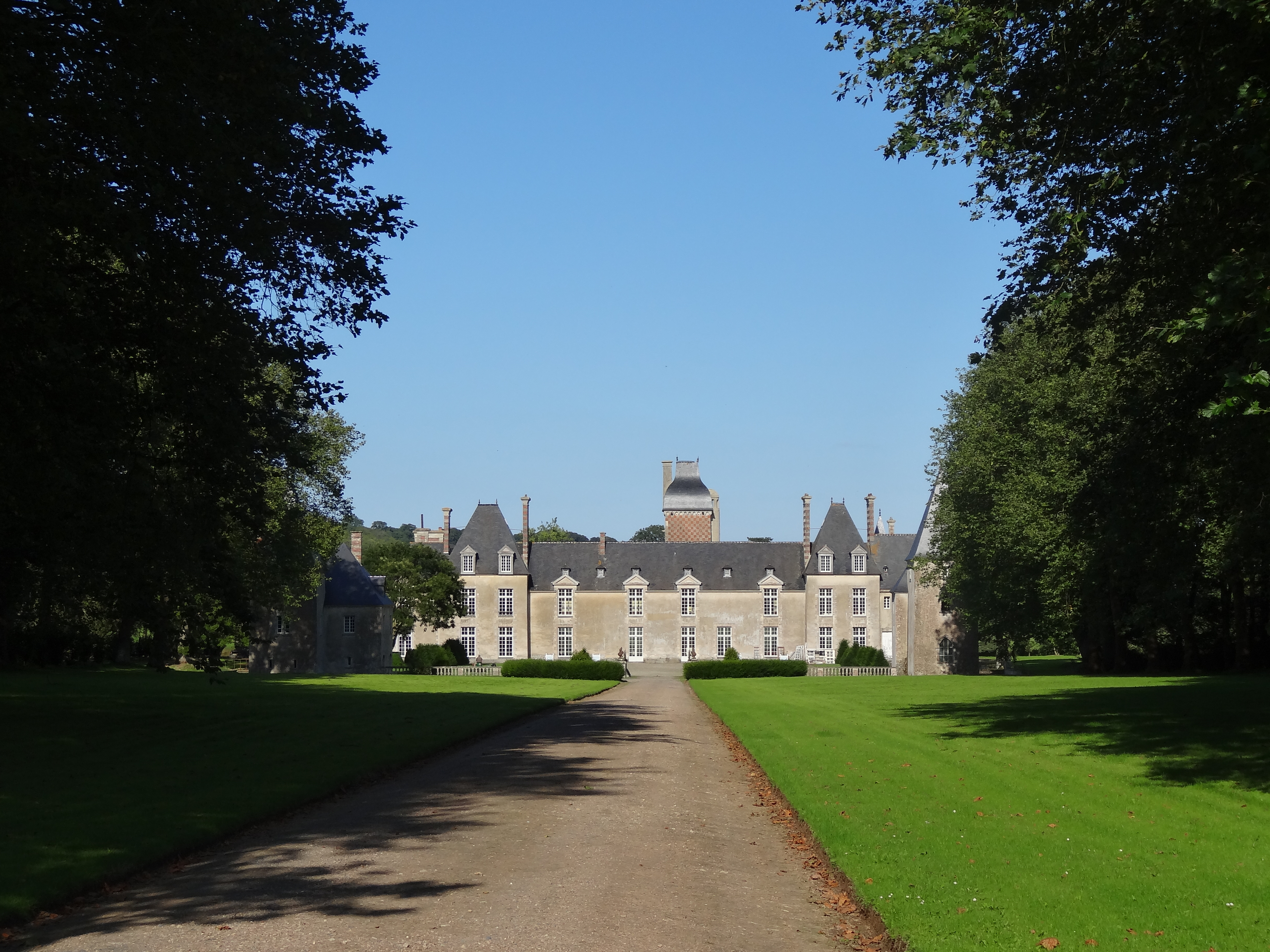
- The chateau in Maisons

- Coat of arms
- Location of Maisons
- Location within France Location within Normandy
- Coordinates: 49°18′56″N 0°44′55″W
- Country: France
- Region: Normandy
- Department: Calvados
- Arrondissement: Bayeux
- Canton: Trévières
- Intercommunality: CC Isigny-Omaha Intercom

Government
  - Mayor (2020–2026): Jean-Noël Guibet
- Area^{1}: 6.67 km^{2} (2.58 sq mi)
- Elevation: 25 m (82 ft)
- Highest elevation: 60 m (200 ft)
- Lowest elevation: 13 m (43 ft)
- Population (2023): 455
  - Density: 68.2/km^{2} (177/sq mi)
- Time zone: UTC+01:00 (CET)
  - Summer (DST): UTC+02:00 (CEST)
- INSEE/Postal code: 14391 /14400
- ^{1} French Land Register data, which excludes lakes, ponds, glaciers > 1 km^{2} (0.386 sq mi or 247 acres) and river estuaries.

Maisons (French pronunciation: [mɛzɔ̃]) is a commune in the Calvados department in the Normandy region in northwestern France.

== Population ==
Historical population
| Year | Pop. | ±% p.a. |
|---|---|---|
| 1968 | 271 | — |
| 1975 | 269 | −0.11% |
| 1982 | 308 | +1.95% |
| 1990 | 347 | +1.50% |
| 1999 | 320 | −0.90% |
| 2007 | 399 | +2.80% |
| 2012 | 390 | −0.46% |
| 2017 | 388 | −0.10% |
| 2023 | 435 | +1.92% |
Source: INSEE

== See also ==
- Communes of the Calvados department
