= Isigny-sur-Mer =

Commune in Calvados, Normandy, France

- Commune
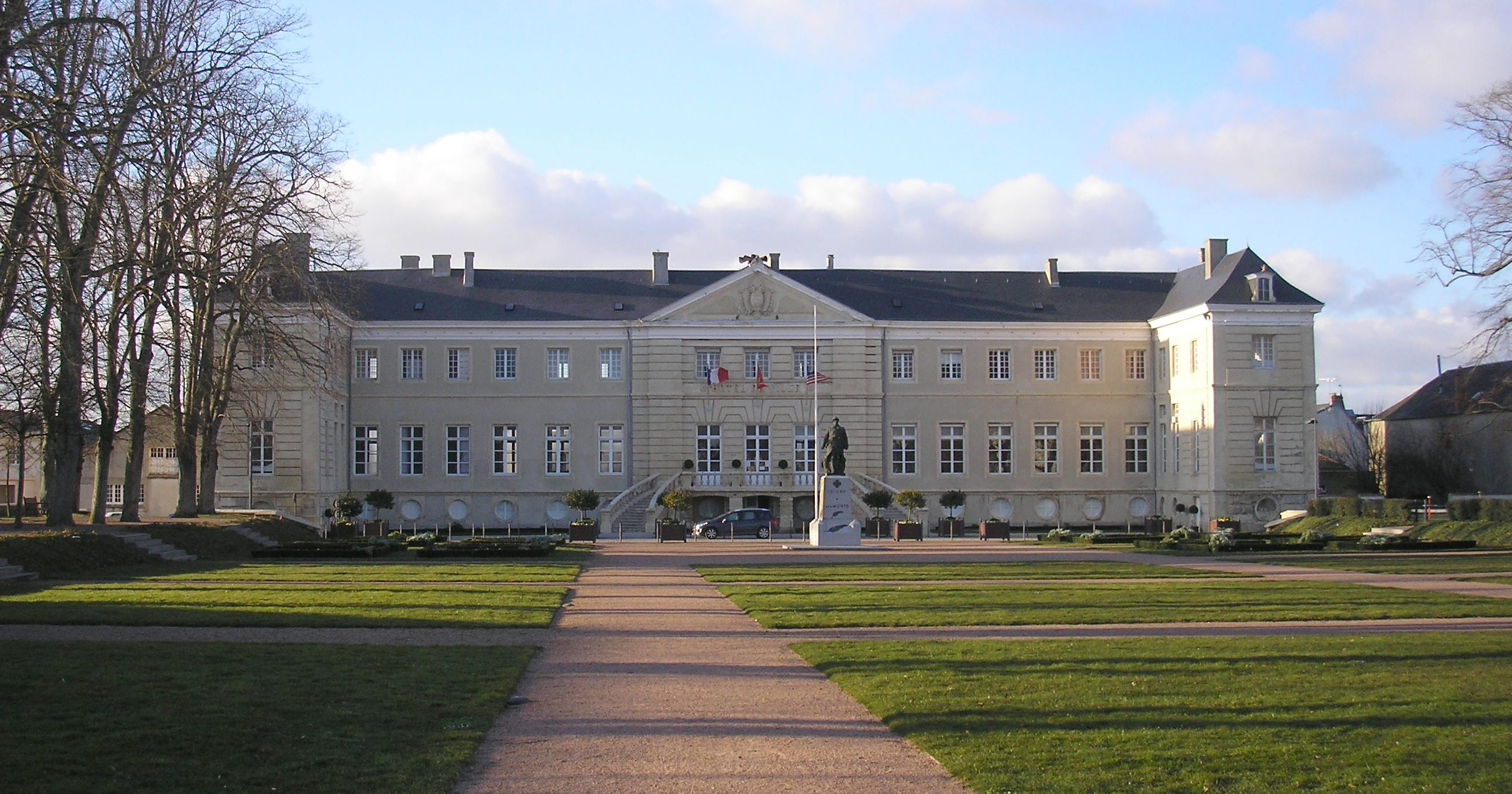
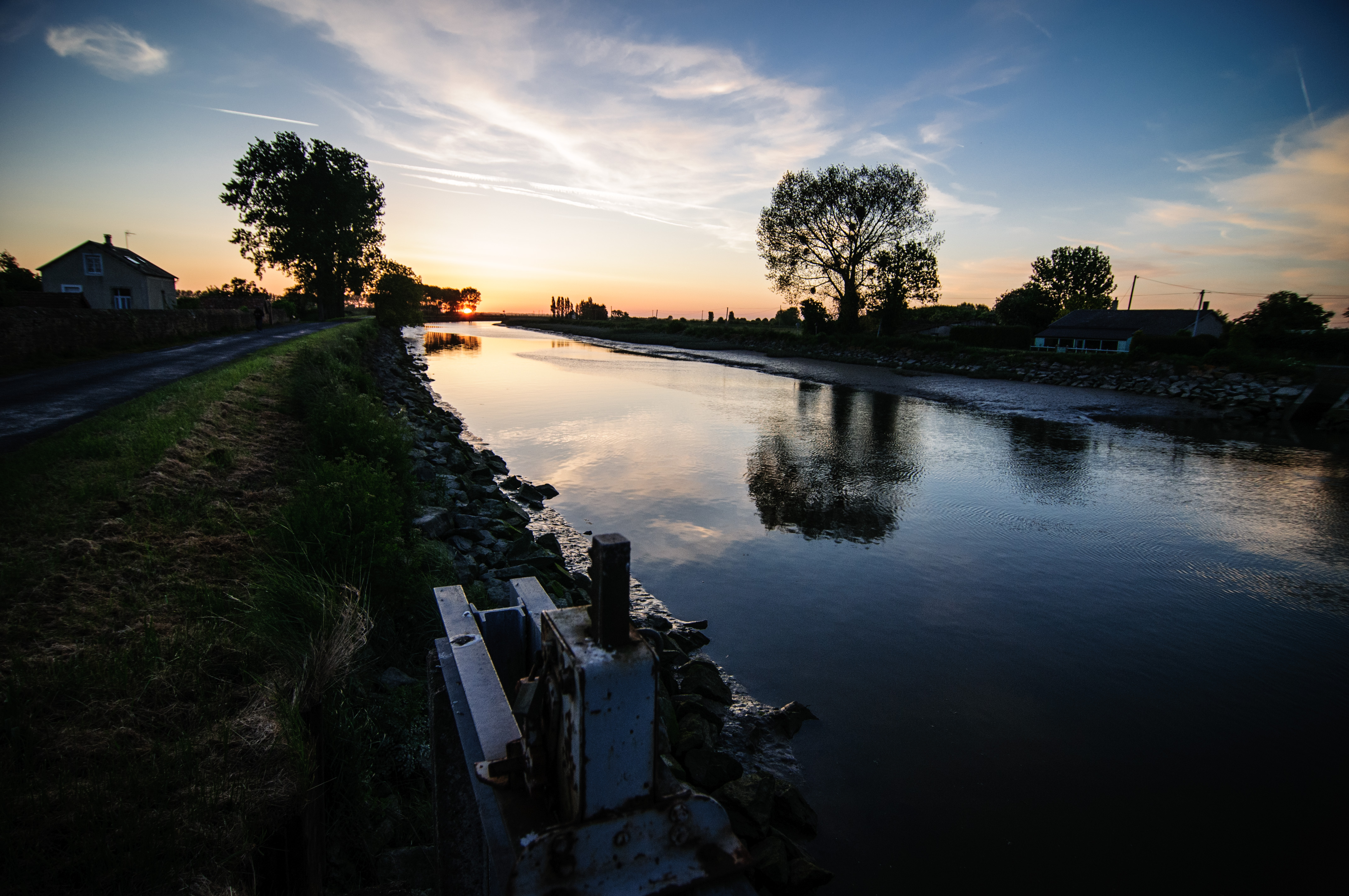
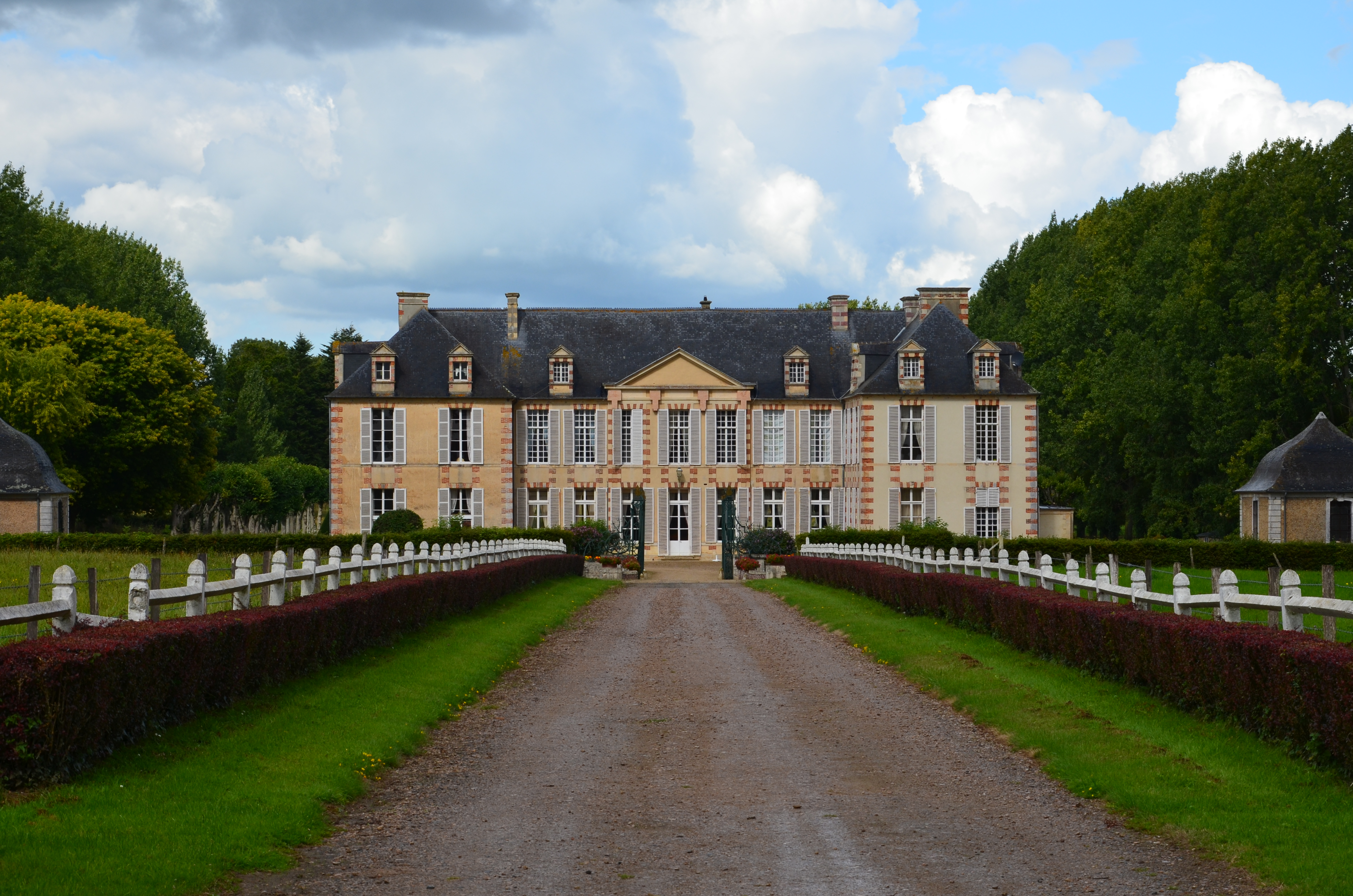
- Town hall Aure river Castle of Castilly

- Coat of arms
- Location of Isigny-sur-Mer
- Location within France Location within Normandy
- Coordinates: 49°19′07″N 1°06′03″W
- Country: France
- Region: Normandy
- Department: Calvados
- Arrondissement: Bayeux
- Canton: Trévières
- Intercommunality: Isigny-Omaha Intercom

Government
  - Mayor (2020–2026): Éric Barbanchon
- Area^{1}: 61.44 km^{2} (23.72 sq mi)
- Elevation: 30 m (98 ft)
- Highest elevation: 64 m (210 ft)
- Lowest elevation: 0 m (0 ft)
- Population (2023): 3,543
  - Density: 57.67/km^{2} (149.4/sq mi)
- Demonym: Isignais
- Time zone: UTC+01:00 (CET)
  - Summer (DST): UTC+02:00 (CEST)
- INSEE/Postal code: 14342 /14230, 14330
- ^{1} French Land Register data, which excludes lakes, ponds, glaciers > 1 km^{2} (0.386 sq mi or 247 acres) and river estuaries.

Isigny-sur-Mer (French pronunciation: [iziɲi syʁ mɛʁ]; lit. 'Isigny-on-Sea') is a commune in the Calvados department in the Normandy region of northwestern France. It is on the departmental border with Manche, on both the Aure and Vire rivers, which join at Isigny; this fertile grassland region makes it renowned for its dairy products, including butters and creams.

It is the most populous commune of the Communauté de communes Isigny-Omaha Intercom, which is seated at the more central Le Molay-Littry. The 59 communes have a combined population of 27,181; Isigny has a population of 3,543.

== Geography ==
Situated in the fertile grassland region – known as the Baie des Veys – which constitutes the joint estuary of four rivers, Isigny is an important centre of the dairy industry. The town is famous for its AOC butter and cream, as well as for the production of Mimolette, Pont-l'Évêque, Camembert, and Trésor d'Isigny cheeses, among others, made by the Isigny Sainte-Mère co-operative. Oysters have been extensively cultivated in the nearby waters of the Baie des Veys since the mid-20th century.

A major river, the Vire, borders the commune to the west and marks the departmental border with Manche.

== History ==
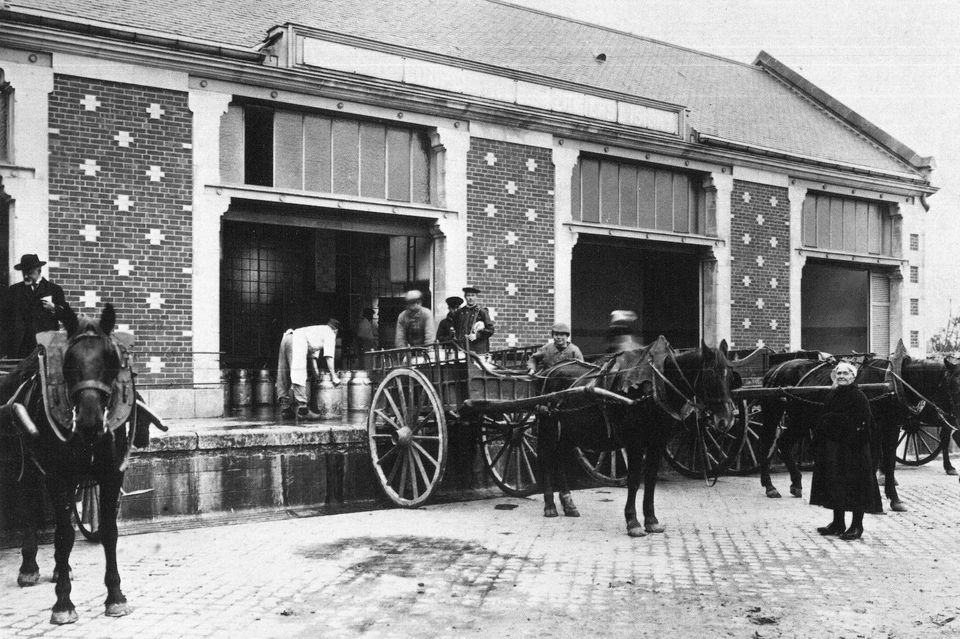
A dairy in Isigny-sur-Mer around 1900

The name of the town is proposed to have derived from Latin "Isiniacum", based on Germanic name "Iso" and Latin ending -iacum.

The town is well positioned and owes its significance to its industrial history. The industrialisation of milk processing began at the start of the 19th century: many factories were built, especially by the Dupont d'Isigny family, which then diversified and created the famous Isigny caramels. More recently, the co-operative Isigny dairy has dominated. Meanwhile, the agricultural fairs and markets have also contributed to Isigny's reputation.

The d'Isigny family traces back to before the Norman conquest of England, and William The Conqueror (1028–82) had military commanders named d'Isigny. In 1924, Isigny was renamed Isigny-sur-Mer.

The port was important in facilitating inshore navigation, allowing commercial and industrial activity to be developed and maintained (import of wood from the North; export coal from the mine at Littry and butter). Fishing was important until the end of the 1970s (mussel fishing and small vessels crewed by fishermen from the Hogues quarter). The famous "Caïeu d'Isigny" is a hymn to Isigny's sailors and fishermen, created in 1869 by Alfred Rossel (1841–1926).

Isigny was more than 60% destroyed by two bombardments on 8 June 1944 and has since been almost entirely rebuilt. Isigny played its part in the D-Day landings: Twenty small Dutch schuyts were employed by the Americans to bring stores and equipment inland from the larger cargo ships that were moored off-shore. Charles de Gaulle paid its inhabitants visits on 14 June 1944 and 16 June 1946.

The Disney surname is derived from the town. The earliest known ancestor of Walt Disney, with a similar name, was Jean-Christophe d'Isigny ("of Isigny"), the branch settled in what is today called Norton Disney in England.

On 1 January 2017, the commune was extended by being merged with the former communes of Castilly, Neuilly-la-Forêt, Les Oubeaux, and Vouilly. Until 2015, Isigny-sur-Mer was the seat of the canton of Isigny-sur-Mer, which included 24 communes and had a population of 9,935.

== Population ==
Population data refer to the commune in its geography as of January 2025.

Historical population
Year	Pop.	±% p.a.
1968	4,979	—
1975	4,647	−0.98%
1982	4,394	−0.80%
1990	4,211	−0.53%
1999	4,035	−0.47%
2007	3,870	−0.52%
2012	3,908	+0.20%
2017	3,639	−1.42%
2023	3,543	−0.44%
Source: INSEE

== Economy ==
Isigny is famous for local products made from milk, such as butter and cream and caramels. Several agro-food companies manufacture these products, including Isigny-Sainte-Mère (butter and cream) and Dupont d'Isigny (caramels).

== International relations ==
The commune is twinned with Weilerbach, Germany.

A twinning arrangement with Kingsbridge in Devon, England, ended in 2019 after 58 years.

== See also ==
- Communes of the Calvados department
- D'Isigny, a cheese made in the US
