= Litteau =

- Commune
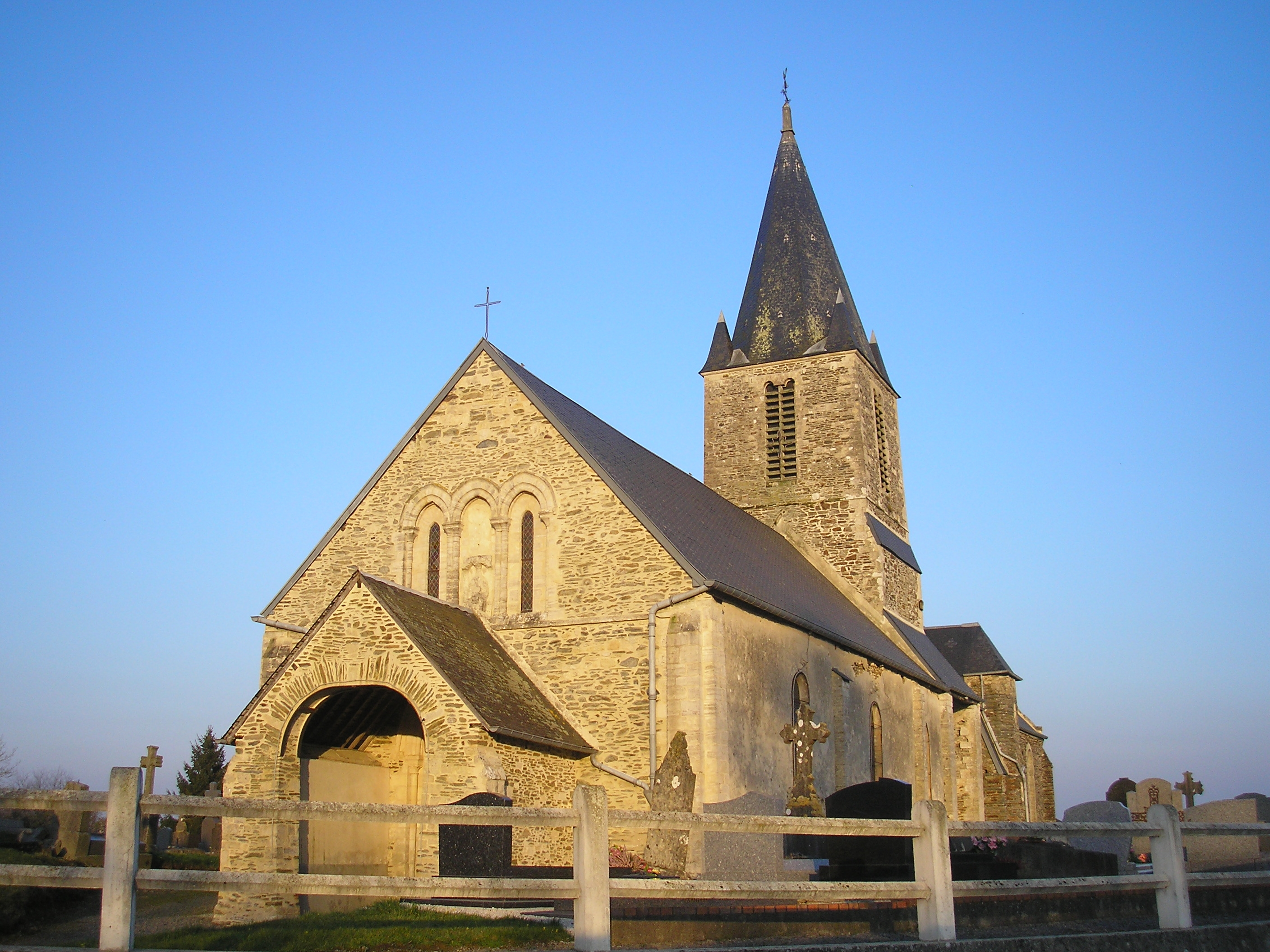
- The church in Litteau
- Location of Litteau
- Location within France Location within Normandy
- Coordinates: 49°09′14″N 0°54′07″W
- Country: France
- Region: Normandy
- Department: Calvados
- Arrondissement: Bayeux
- Canton: Trévières
- Intercommunality: CC Isigny-Omaha Intercom

Government
  - Mayor (2020–2026): Savanna Bonhomme
- Area^{1}: 6.94 km^{2} (2.68 sq mi)
- Elevation: 120 m (390 ft)
- Highest elevation: 143 m (469 ft)
- Lowest elevation: 88 m (289 ft)
- Population (2023): 271
  - Density: 39.0/km^{2} (101/sq mi)
- Time zone: UTC+01:00 (CET)
  - Summer (DST): UTC+02:00 (CEST)
- INSEE/Postal code: 14369 /14490
- ^{1} French Land Register data, which excludes lakes, ponds, glaciers > 1 km^{2} (0.386 sq mi or 247 acres) and river estuaries.

Litteau (French pronunciation: [lito]) is a commune in the Calvados department in the Normandy region in northwestern France. The 19th-century poet Hippolyte Guérin was born in Litteau.

== Population ==
Historical population
Year	Pop.	±% p.a.
1968	253	—
1975	241	−0.69%
1982	227	−0.85%
1990	217	−0.56%
1999	214	−0.15%
2007	246	+1.76%
2012	276	+2.33%
2017	293	+1.20%
2023	271	−1.29%
Source: INSEE

== See also ==
- Communes of the Calvados department
