= Saint-Laurent-sur-Mer =

- Commune
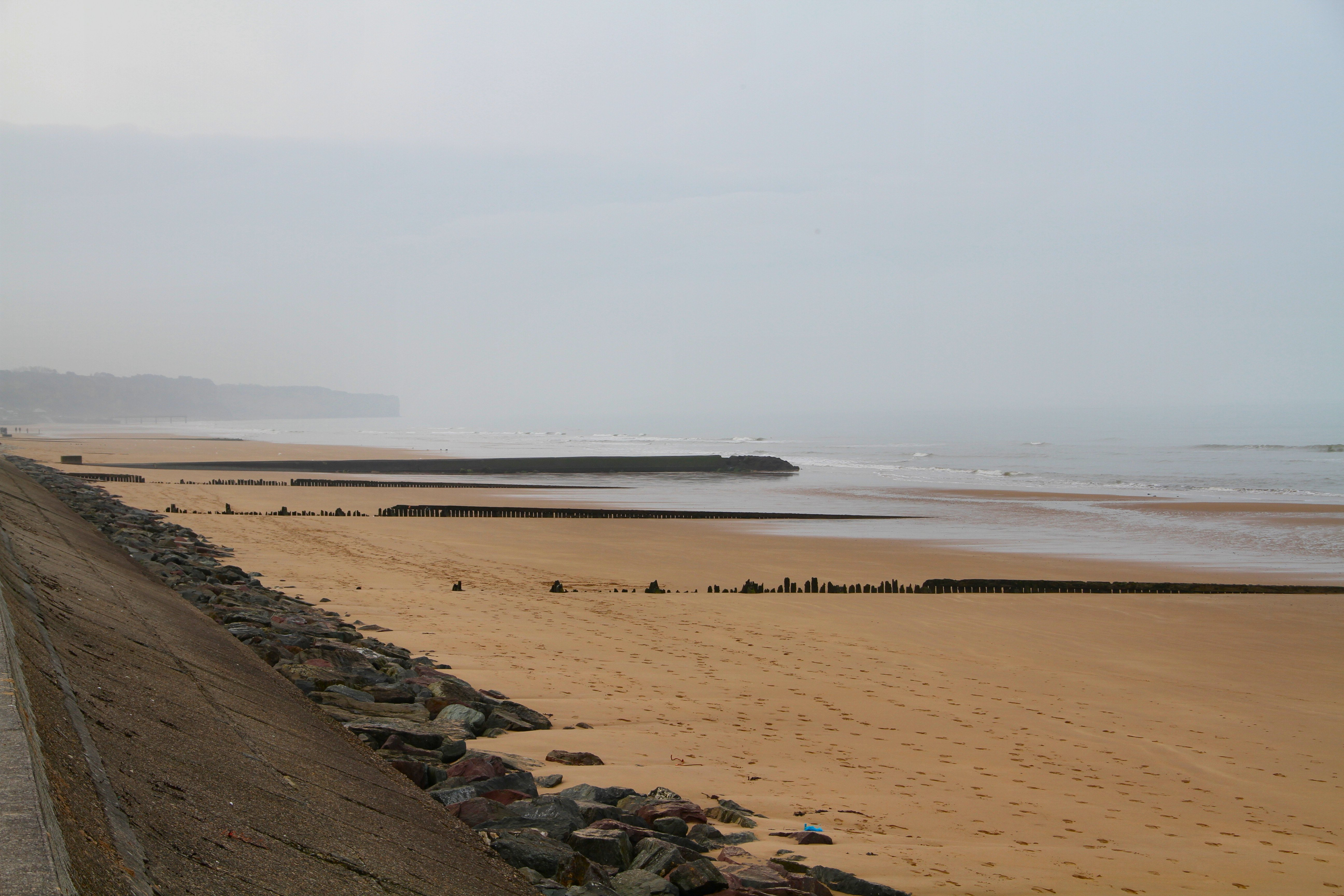
- Omaha Beach
- Location of Saint-Laurent-sur-Mer
- Location within France Location within Normandy
- Coordinates: 49°21′34″N 0°52′35″W
- Country: France
- Region: Normandy
- Department: Calvados
- Arrondissement: Bayeux
- Canton: Trévières
- Intercommunality: CC Isigny-Omaha Intercom

Government
  - Mayor (2020–2026): Denis Madouasse
- Area^{1}: 3.9 km^{2} (1.5 sq mi)
- Elevation: 30 m (98 ft)
- Highest elevation: 76 m (249 ft)
- Lowest elevation: 3 m (9.8 ft)
- Population (2023): 268
  - Density: 69/km^{2} (180/sq mi)
- Time zone: UTC+01:00 (CET)
  - Summer (DST): UTC+02:00 (CEST)
- INSEE/Postal code: 14605 /14710
- ^{1} French Land Register data, which excludes lakes, ponds, glaciers > 1 km^{2} (0.386 sq mi or 247 acres) and river estuaries.

Saint-Laurent-sur-Mer (French pronunciation: [sɛ̃ loʁɑ̃ syʁ mɛʁ], literally Saint-Laurent on Sea) is a commune in the Calvados department in the Normandy region in northwestern France. The town is located not far from Omaha Beach, where, in World War II, Allied forces landed during D-Day.

It was also the location of a British Commando raid - Operation Curlew during January 1942.

== Population ==
Historical population
Year	Pop.	±% p.a.
1968	174	—
1975	161	−1.10%
1982	188	+2.24%
1990	163	−1.77%
1999	184	+1.36%
2007	236	+3.16%
2012	244	+0.67%
2017	261	+1.36%
2023	268	+0.44%
Source: INSEE

== See also ==
- Communes of the Calvados department
