= Le Molay-Littry =

- Commune
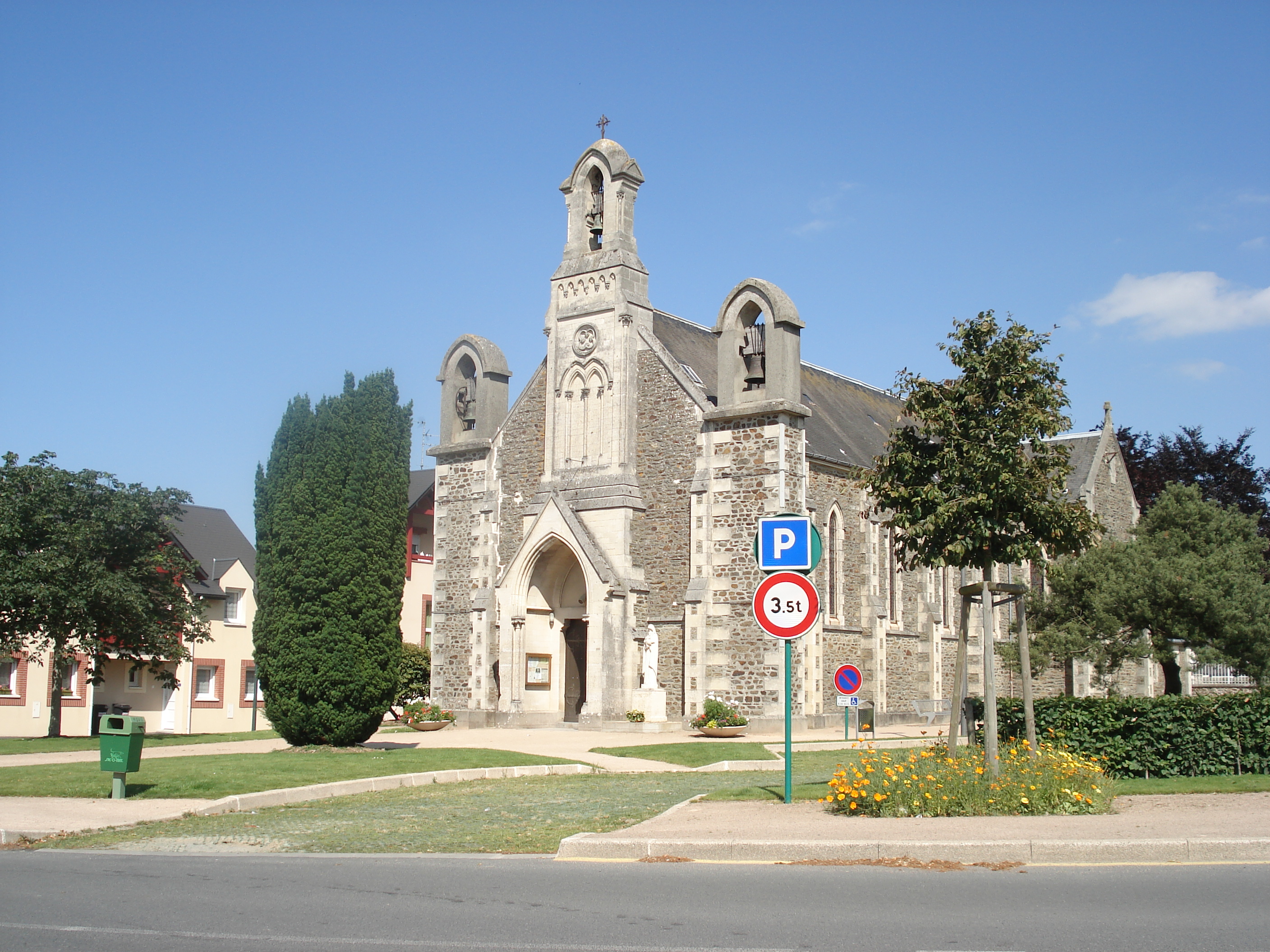
- Mine chapel

- Coat of arms
- Location of Le Molay-Littry
- Location within France Location within Normandy
- Coordinates: 49°14′34″N 0°52′22″W
- Country: France
- Region: Normandy
- Department: Calvados
- Arrondissement: Bayeux
- Canton: Trévières
- Intercommunality: CC Isigny-Omaha Intercom

Government
  - Mayor (2020–2026): Guillaume Bertier
- Area^{1}: 27.12 km^{2} (10.47 sq mi)
- Elevation: 40 m (130 ft)
- Highest elevation: 112 m (367 ft)
- Lowest elevation: 25 m (82 ft)
- Population (2023): 3,124
  - Density: 115.2/km^{2} (298.3/sq mi)
- Time zone: UTC+01:00 (CET)
  - Summer (DST): UTC+02:00 (CEST)
- INSEE/Postal code: 14370 /14330
- ^{1} French Land Register data, which excludes lakes, ponds, glaciers > 1 km^{2} (0.386 sq mi or 247 acres) and river estuaries.

Le Molay-Littry (French pronunciation: [lə mɔlɛ litʁi]) is a commune in the Calvados department in the Normandy region in northwestern France.

== History ==
On 23 January 1969 Le Molay merged with the old commune of Littry to form Le Molay-Littry.

Le Molay-Littry has good travel links with neighbouring towns such as Isigny, Bayeux, Saint-Lô, and Balleroy, which served it well in the early 17th century. At that time, the town was a local source of coal which made the town a wealthy one. The town still has a mining museum which is open to the public.

== Château du Molay ==
The Château du Molay was built on the northwest side of town about two-and-a-half centuries ago on 45 acres of wooded grounds.

In 1758, a young Jacques-Jean le Coulteux du Molay (1740–1823), and his wife Geneviéve –Sophie le Coulteux de la Noraye (painted below in 1788); built the château, his first large residence, in the heart of Normandy's woodland countryside, close to his birthplace in Rouen. Jacques-Jean was a wealthy and well-known banker, who had one son, Jacques Félix Le Coulteux du Molay (born in Paris on 29 June 1779 and died in Dijon on 1 April 1812) with Genevieve before their divorce. During their time together, they also bought the famous Malmaison near Paris – some of those styles are reflected in the château today. Jacques-Jean later married Alexandrine Sophie Pauline Le Couteulx, with whom he had three children.

=== 19th century ===
In 1833, Edouard, Count of Chabrol-Crousol, transformed and extended the château, giving it its present architectural style. The Count of Chabrol-Crousol was a member of the House of Peers during the reign of Napoleon III. An art collector and avid book–lover, he was the grandfather of the French composer Vincent d'Indy who died in 1931. Edouard was also the prefect of the Seine region of Paris and inaugurated the Palais Brongniart, which Napoleon Bonaparte ordered built to house the Paris stock exchange permanently from 1826.

At the end of the 19th century, the château became the property of the Viellard family.

=== World War II ===
There followed a sumptuous period of 50 years up to the dark hours of 1940 when the German Army commandeered the château.

The Balleroy and Molay-Littry area was one of the places where the Germans were setting up V-weapon installations. Though never used, their existence is a fascinating and scary story. The chateau is one of the places from where the German army planned to launch their weapons. The devastating V2 weapon was one of those, and it was estimated that by the later stages of the war some 100 rockets per day could have launched. The area and the V-weapons project were under the control of Generalleutnant (General) Dietrich Kraiss and his 352nd Static Infantry Division.

Kraiss was a commander of the 90th Infantry Regiment (from September 1939 to March 1941), 168th Infantry Division (from July 1941 to March 1943) and 355th Infantry Division until May 1943. In November 1943 he took command of the 352nd Infantry Division which was in 1944, with six other divisions, located in Normandy in front of the Allied invasion. His 352nd Infantry Division had 7,400 soldiers and kept defensive positions around St. Lô. He was eventually killed in the fighting of Omaha Beach when one of their own mortars hit him, blowing him to pieces. Dietrich Kraiss was born on 16 November 1889 in Stuttgart and died on 2 August 1944 – he was awarded the Knight's Cross with Oak Leaves for his services.

=== Tournières ===
Tournières is a little village not far from Molay-Littry where U.S. General Dwight D. Eisenhower established his first HQ in France code-named Shellburst. The success of the landings on 5 June 1944 led the Red Cross, and later the Maquis, to establish themselves here temporarily. Many important meetings took place at Shellburst.

After the liberation of the area by Allied Forces in early June, engineers of the Ninth Air Force IX Engineering Command began construction of a combat Advanced Landing Ground outside of the town. Declared operational on 25 June, the airfield was designated as "A-9", it was used by photo-reconnaissance units and various repair and support units until October when it was closed.

=== Surrounding area ===
A boarding school for girls from Saint–Lo, then a summer camp for Citroën both benefited from its peaceful grounds until 1978. At that time, the chateau was completely renovated and transformed into a three-star hotel. In February 1993, the Chateau du Molay was purchased by Travelbound, an English education travel company owned by specialist travel group Travelopia.

== Population ==
Population data refer to the commune in its geography as of January 2025.

Historical population
Year	Pop.	±% p.a.
1968	2,135	—
1975	2,302	+1.08%
1982	2,522	+1.31%
1990	2,584	+0.30%
1999	2,657	+0.31%
2007	2,989	+1.48%
2012	3,080	+0.60%
2017	2,988	−0.60%
2023	3,124	+0.74%
Source: INSEE

== International relations ==
The commune is twinned with:

- Bovey Tracey (in Devon in the UK).
- Dahlenburg (Germany)

== See also ==
- Communes of the Calvados department
