= Canton of Trévières =

Coordinates: 49°18′39″N 0°52′10″W

Trévières
- Canton
- Country: France
- Region: Normandy
- Department: Calvados
- No. of communes: {{{nbcomm}}}

Government
  - Representatives (2021–2028): Patricia Gady-Duquesne; Patrick Thomines
- Area: 581.74 km^{2} (224.61 sq mi)
- Population (2023): 26,442
  - Density: 45.453/km^{2} (117.72/sq mi)
- INSEE code: 14 23

The canton of Trévières is an administrative division of the Calvados département, in northwestern France. Its chief town is Trévières. Its borders were modified at the French canton reorganisation which came into effect in March 2015

== Composition ==
It consists of the following communes:

1. Asnières-en-Bessin
2. Aure sur Mer
3. Balleroy-sur-Drôme
4. La Bazoque
5. Bernesq
6. Blay
7. Le Breuil-en-Bessin
8. Bricqueville
9. Cahagnolles
10. La Cambe
11. Canchy
12. Cardonville
13. Cartigny-l'Épinay
14. Castillon
15. Colleville-sur-Mer
16. Colombières
17. Cormolain
18. Cricqueville-en-Bessin
19. Crouay
20. Deux-Jumeaux
21. Englesqueville-la-Percée
22. Étréham
23. La Folie
24. Formigny La Bataille
25. Foulognes
26. Géfosse-Fontenay
27. Grandcamp-Maisy
28. Isigny-sur-Mer
29. Lison
30. Litteau
31. Longueville
32. Maisons
33. Mandeville-en-Bessin
34. Le Molay-Littry
35. Monfréville
36. Montfiquet
37. Mosles
38. Noron-la-Poterie
39. Osmanville
40. Planquery
41. Rubercy
42. Sainte-Honorine-de-Ducy
43. Sainte-Marguerite-d'Elle
44. Saint-Germain-du-Pert
45. Saint-Laurent-sur-Mer
46. Saint-Marcouf
47. Saint-Martin-de-Blagny
48. Saint-Paul-du-Vernay
49. Saint-Pierre-du-Mont
50. Sallen
51. Saon
52. Saonnet
53. Surrain
54. Tour-en-Bessin
55. Tournières
56. Trévières
57. Le Tronquay
58. Trungy
59. Vierville-sur-Mer

== Councillors ==
Election	Councillors	Party	Occupation
2015	Patricia Gady Duquesne	DVD	Mayor of Le Tronquay
2015	Jean-Pierre Richard	LR	Mayor of Trévières
2015	Laurent Aubry	UDI	Councillor of Isigny-sur-Mer
2016	Patrick Thomines	LR	Mayor of Colleville-sur-Mer
2021	Patricia Gady Duquesne	DVD	Mayor of Le Tronquay
2021	Patrick Thomines	LR	Mayor of Colleville-sur-Mer

Following the death of Jean-Pierre Richard and the resignation of his substitute, Laurent Aubry, a by-election is held on June 12 and 19, 2016. In the second round, Patrick Thomines (LR) is elected with 62.96% of the votes cast.

== Pictures of the canton ==
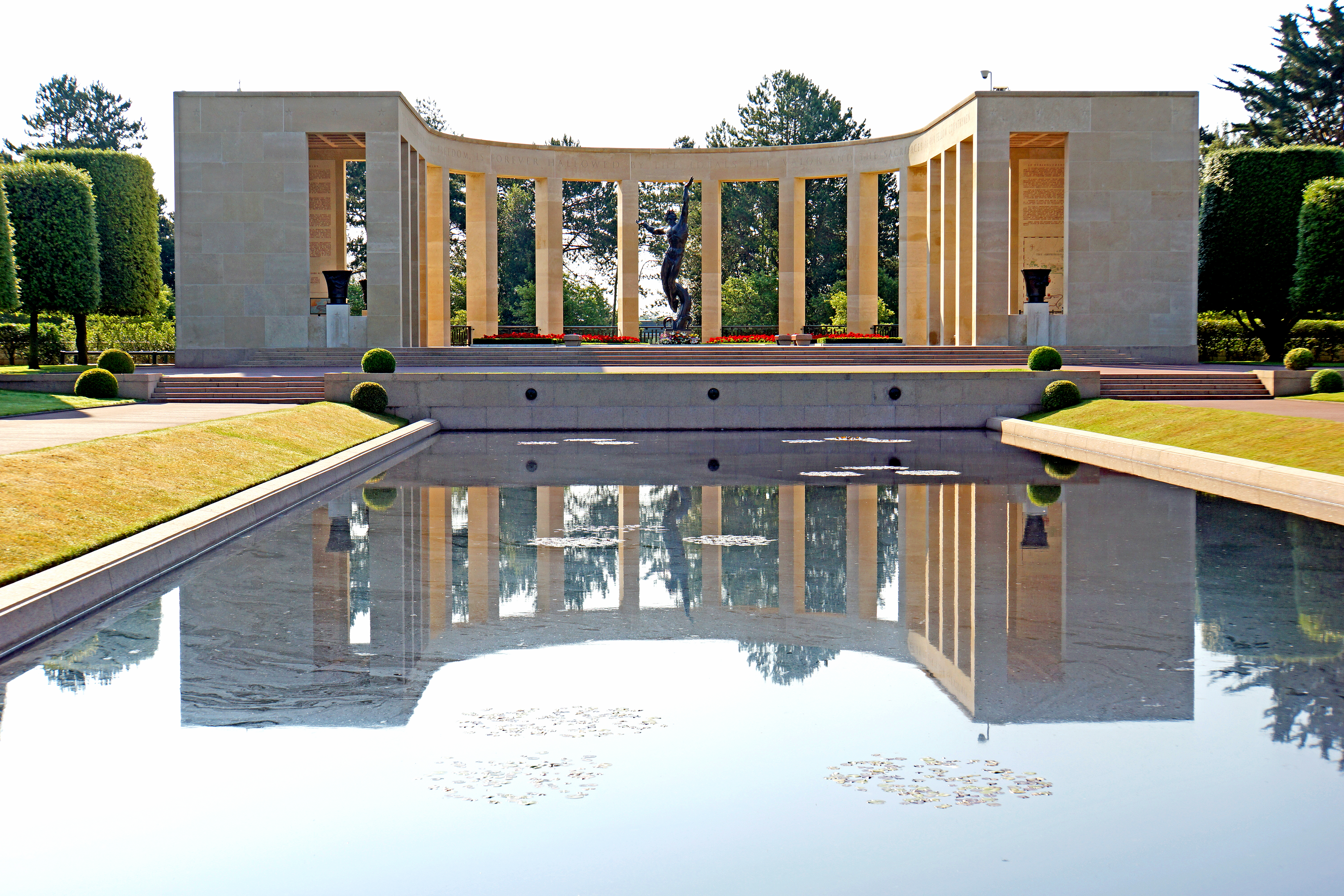
Normandy American Cemetery and Memorial in Colleville-sur-Mer

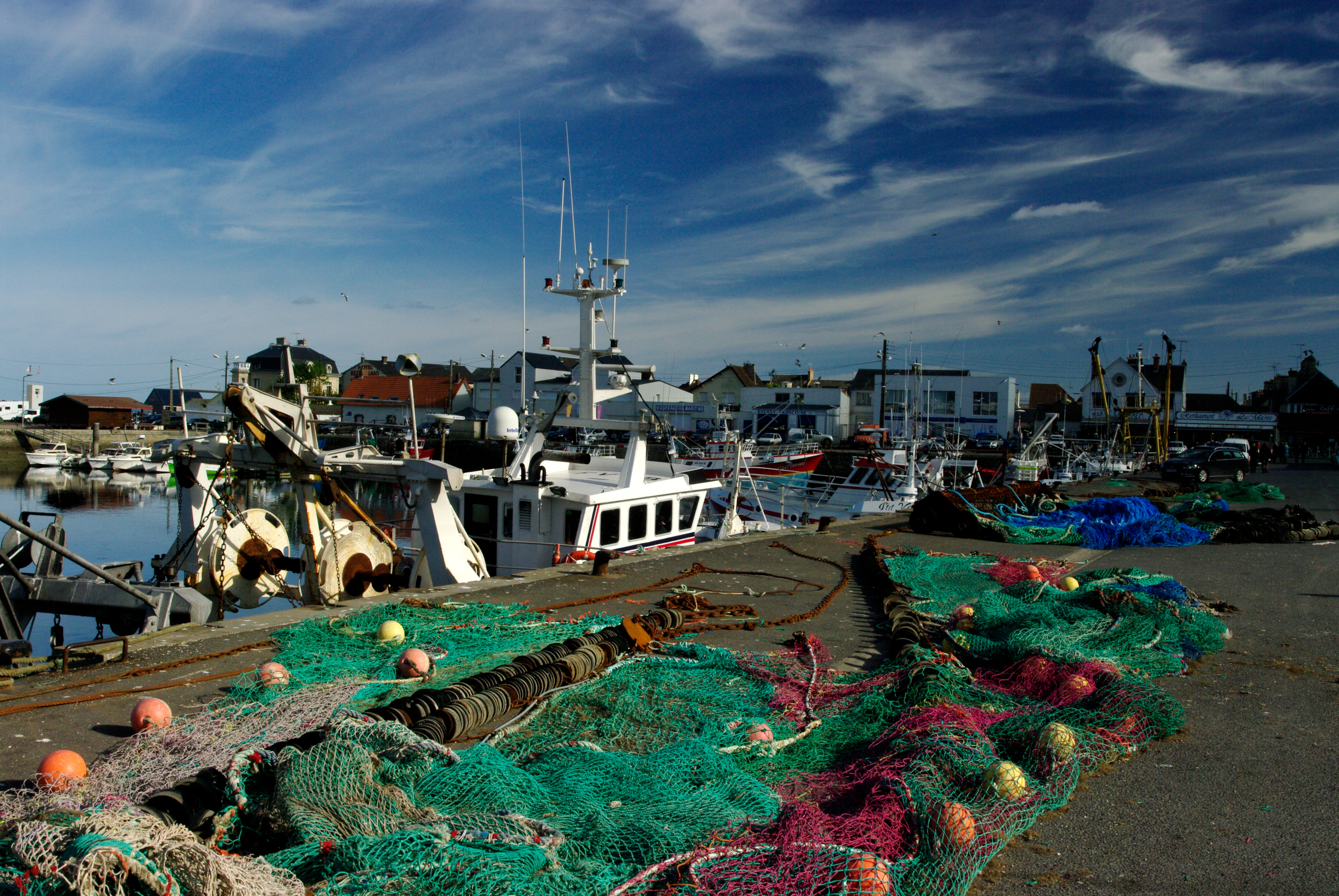
Fishing port of Grandcamp-Maisy

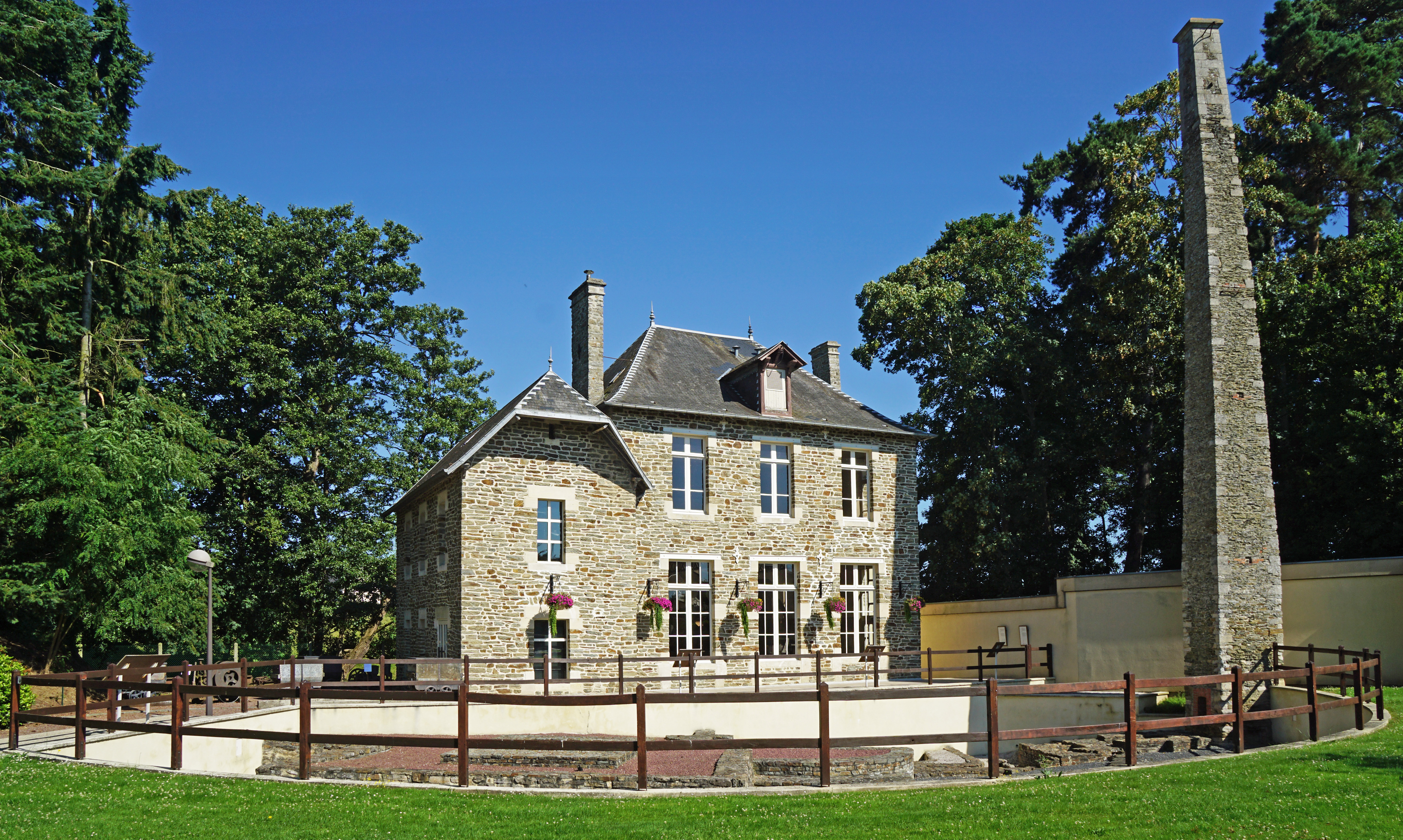
The Molay-Littry Mine Museum
