= Drôme (Aure) =

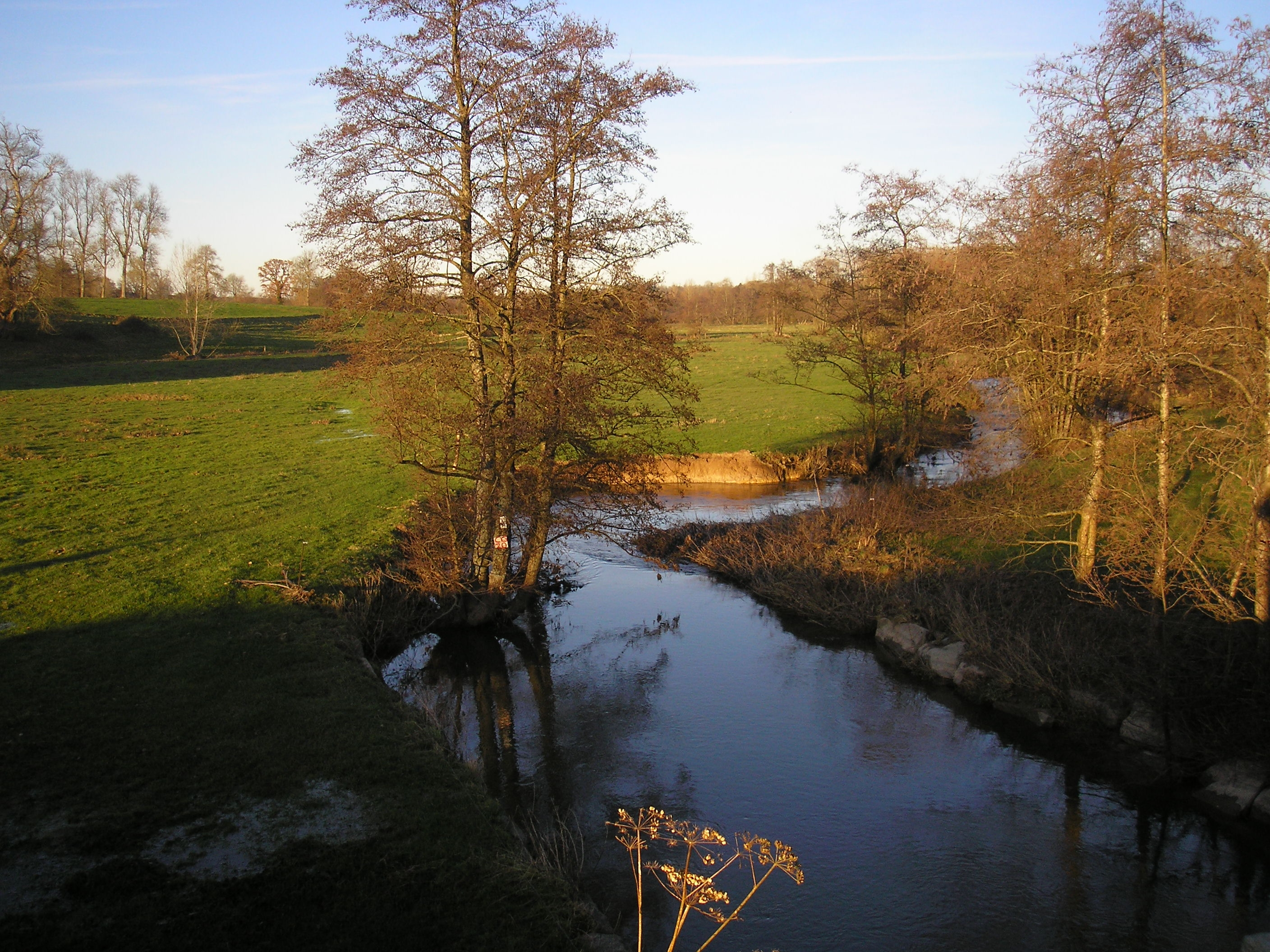
- between Vidouville and La Vacquerie

- Location within France Location within Normandy

Location
- Country: France

Physical characteristics
- Source
  - location: Saint-Martin-des-Besaces
  - coordinates: 49.0089°N 0.9006°W
  - elevation: 205 m (673 ft)
- Mouth
  - location: Aure
  - coordinates: 49°19′15″N 0°45′01″W
  - elevation: 18 m (59 ft)
- Length: 57.9 km (36.0 mi)
- Basin size: 245 km^{2} (95 sq mi)
- Discharge
  - average: 2.33 m^{3}/s (82 cu ft/s) (Sully)

Basin features
- Progression: Aure→ Vire→ English Channel

The Drôme is a 57.9 km long river in Normandy. Its source is on the border of the Manche and Calvados departments, at le Grand Cauville locality, near Saint-Martin-des-Besaces and joins the Aure, left bank at Maisons, downstream of Bayeux in the Bessin region. It is a sub-affluent of the Vire.

== Watershed ==
The watershed of the Drôme neighbours those of the Vire, Aure (east), Tortonne (NW) and Seulles (SE).

It is a narrow, northward basin. The longest of its affluents is the ruisseau du Vey (7.3 km), which it joins at Cormolain.

== Drôme valley ==
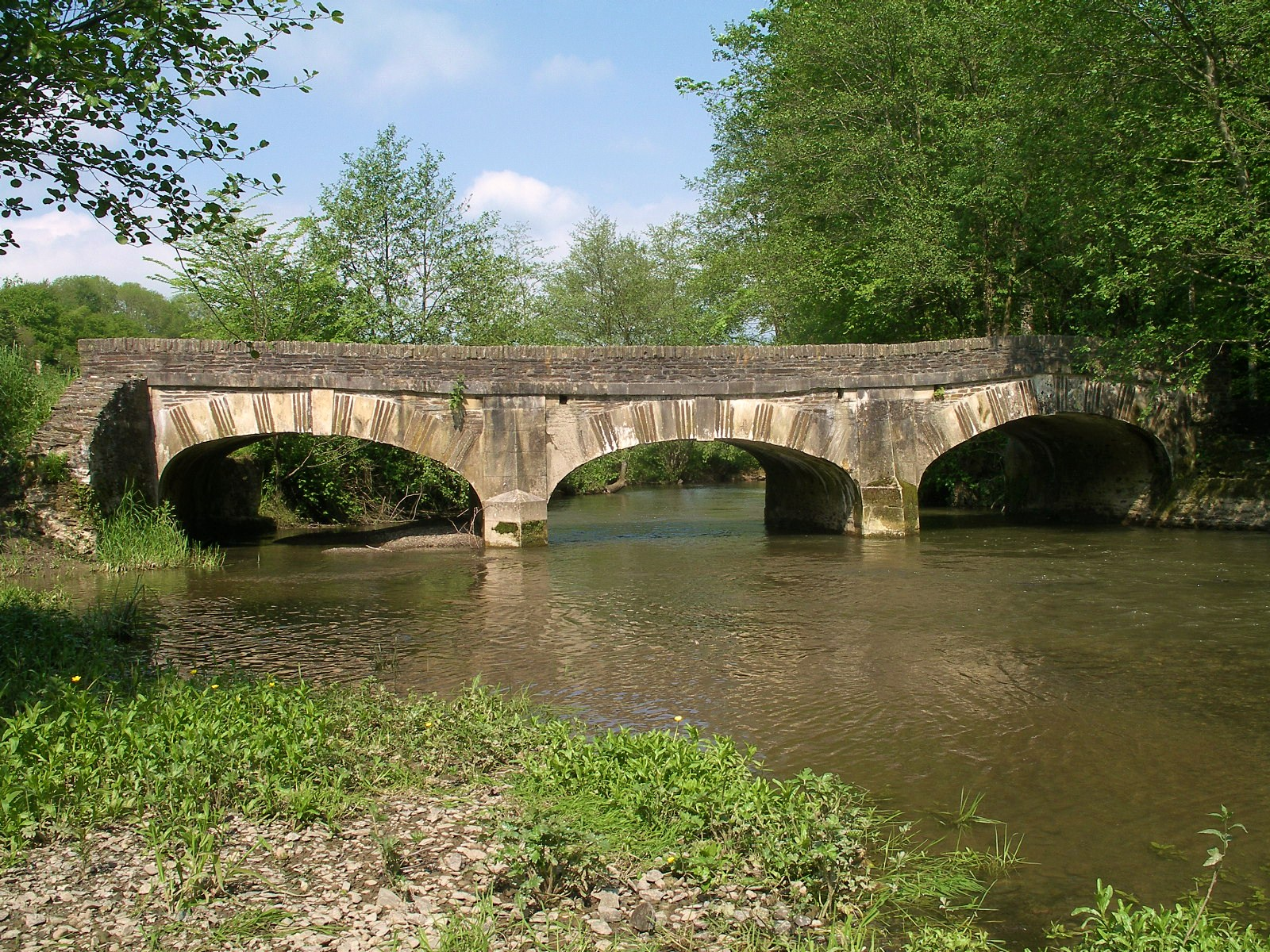
Sully bridge

- Castle (ranked monument historique) and Saint-Martin de Balleroy Church (ranked) at Balleroy,
- Pont de Sully (inscrit) between Castillon and Vaubadon.
- Manoir du Pont-Senot (inscrit) à Noron-la-Poterie.
- Église Notre-Dame de Ranchy (clocher inscrit).
- Château de Barbeville (inscrit).
- Castle (inscrit) and Église Saint-Cyr-et-Sainte-Julitte (inscrite) at Vaucelles.
- Église Notre-Dame-de-la-Nativité at Sully (inscrite).
