= Balleroy =

Commune in Calvados, France

- Part of Balleroy-sur-Drôme
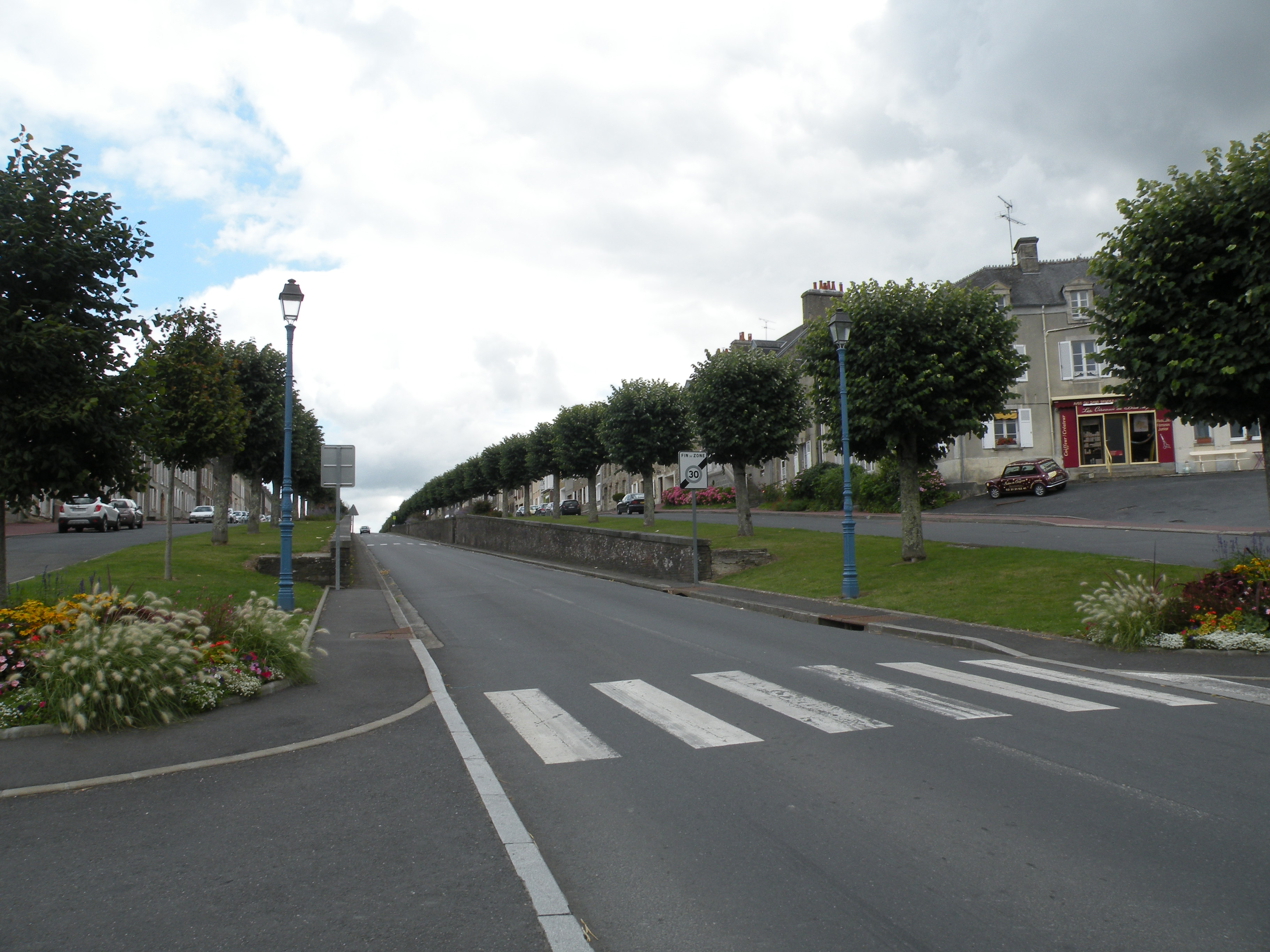
- A street in Balleroy

- Coat of arms
- Location of Balleroy
- Location within France Location within Normandy
- Coordinates: 49°10′53″N 0°50′13″W
- Country: France
- Region: Normandy
- Department: Calvados
- Arrondissement: Bayeux
- Canton: Trévières
- Commune: Balleroy-sur-Drôme
- Area^{1}: 4.23 km^{2} (1.63 sq mi)
- Elevation: 110 m (360 ft)
- Highest elevation: 131 m (430 ft)
- Lowest elevation: 49 m (161 ft)
- Population (2022): 900
  - Density: 210/km^{2} (550/sq mi)
- Time zone: UTC+01:00 (CET)
  - Summer (DST): UTC+02:00 (CEST)
- Postal code: 14490
- ^{1} French Land Register data, which excludes lakes, ponds, glaciers > 1 km^{2} (0.386 sq mi or 247 acres) and river estuaries.

Balleroy (French pronunciation: [baləʁwa]) is a former commune in the Calvados department in the Normandy region of north-western France. On 1 January 2016, it was merged into the new commune of Balleroy-sur-Drôme.

== Geography ==
Balleroy is 16 km south-west of Bayeux and 21 km north-east of Saint-Lô. Access roads include the D13 from Cerisy-la-Forêt, which continues east to Lingèvres. The D28 road goes south from the village to Planquery. The commune is mainly farmland with the Château de Balleroy grounds just west of the village (much of this former commune).

The river Drôme forms the western and north-western borders of the commune as it flows north-east to eventually join the ocean at Port-en-Bessin-Huppain. The Ruisseau de la Commune flows from the west to join the Drome in the commune. The Vesbire forms the south-eastern border of the commune as it flows south-west to join the Drôme.

== History ==
Until 1521 the commune was the property of the lord of Aunay. The lordship of Balleroy was purchased by the Trextot family. Jean de Choisy, counselor, notary and secretary of the king, in turn bought the lordship of Balleroy as well as the lands of Cormolain, Montfiquet, and Vaubadon. He was the son of Jean de Choisy, intendant of Metz, knight, advisor to the king and the Duke of Orléans, Lord of Balleroy, Beaumont, Grandcamp, Léthanville, and Saint-Pierre and he founded the present chateau. He made the inhabitants near the chateau into vassals, forcing them to build their homes there.

In 1634 the Lord of Balleroy obtained the establishment of a weekly market (on Tuesday) and two fairs a year.

During the French revolutionary period of the National Convention (1792-1795), the commune was called Bal-sur-Drôme.

=== Heraldry ===
Arms of Balleroy	Blazon: Quarterly: at 1 and 4 Azure, a saltire engrailed of Or cantoned with four roundels the same; at 2 and 3, Argent, three hearts of Gules. The blazon of quarters 2 and 3 (hearts) is that of the de La Cour de Balleroy family (extinct), the former Marquises of Balleroy.

== Administration ==
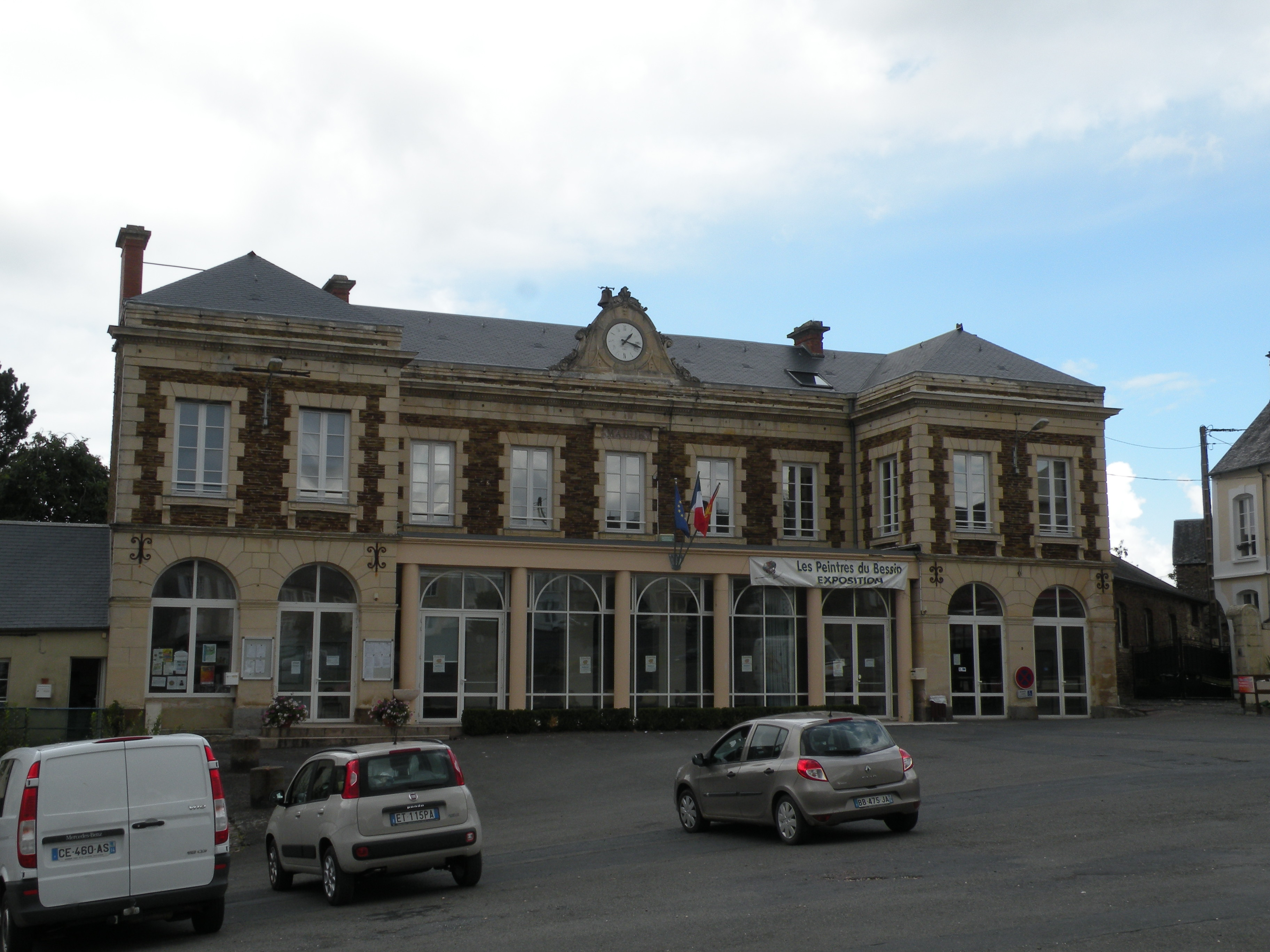
Balleroy Town Hall

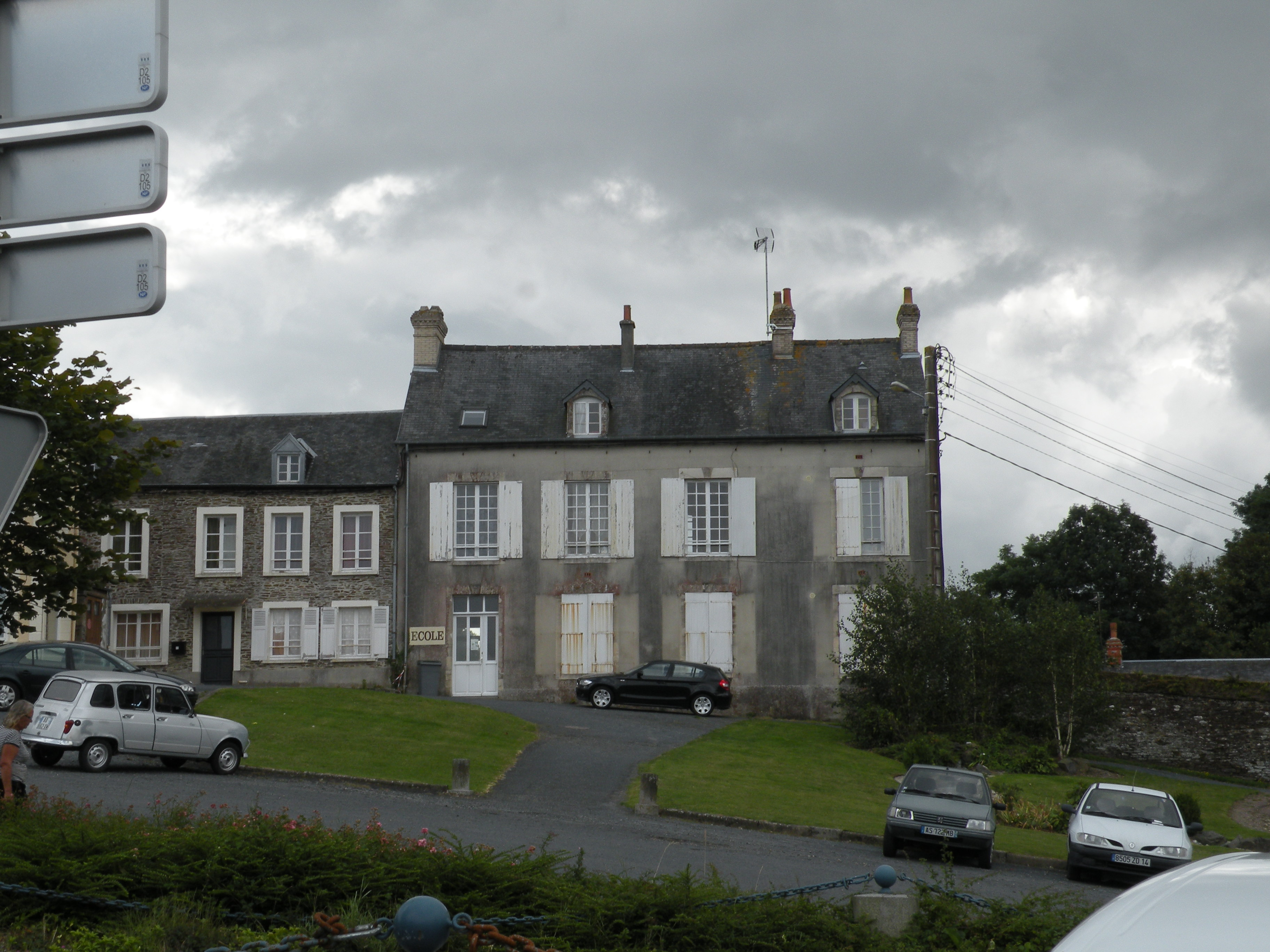
Balleroy School

Balleroy was part of the Community of communes Intercom Balleroy Le Molay-Littry which included 22 communes and had its seat in Le Molay-Littry.

Balleroy was the seat of the former Canton of Balleroy. Since the 2015 French cantons reform, it is part of the canton of Trévières.

List of Successive Mayors

From	To	Name	Party	Position
1850		M Villeroy		
~1970	~1980	Pierre Blanchard		
2001	2006	Yves Houel		
2006	2014	Denis Legrand		
2014	2016	Gilbert Montaigne		

=== Twinning ===
Balleroy has twinning associations with:

- Shebbear (United Kingdom) since 1979.
- Ribe (Denmark) since 1986.
- Fo (Burkina Faso) since 1989.

== Demography ==
The inhabitants of the commune are known as Biardais or Biardaises and Billards or Billardes in French.

Historical population

Year	Pop.	±% p.a.
1793	1,228	—
1800	1,176	−0.62%
1806	1,391	+2.84%
1821	1,326	−0.32%
1831	1,267	−0.45%
1836	1,395	+1.94%
1841	1,310	−1.25%
1846	1,291	−0.29%
1851	1,311	+0.31%
1856	1,244	−1.04%
1861	1,286	+0.67%
1866	1,284	−0.03%
1872	1,220	−0.85%
1876	1,114	−2.25%
1881	1,124	+0.18%
1886	1,110	−0.25%
1891	1,103	−0.13%
1896	1,085	−0.33%

Year	Pop.	±% p.a.
1901	1,059	−0.48%
1906	1,037	−0.42%
1911	1,015	−0.43%
1921	913	−1.05%
1926	850	−1.42%
1931	882	+0.74%
1936	836	−1.07%
1946	950	+1.29%
1954	866	−1.15%
1962	829	−0.54%
1968	757	−1.50%
1975	712	−0.87%
1982	720	+0.16%
1990	613	−1.99%
1999	787	+2.82%
2007	757	−0.48%
2012	985	+5.41%
2022	900	−0.90%

Source: EHESS and INSEE

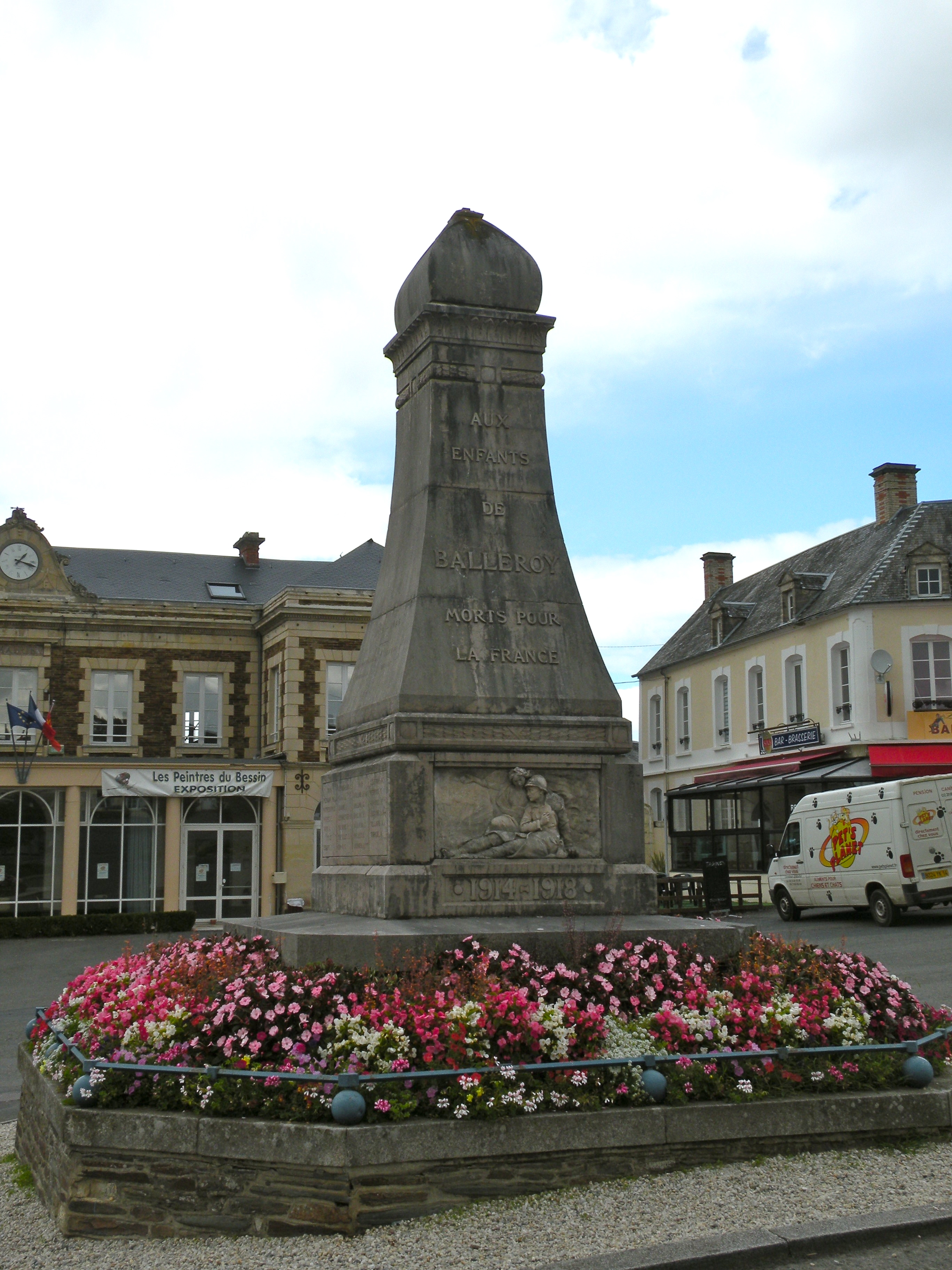
The War Memorial

== Culture and heritage ==
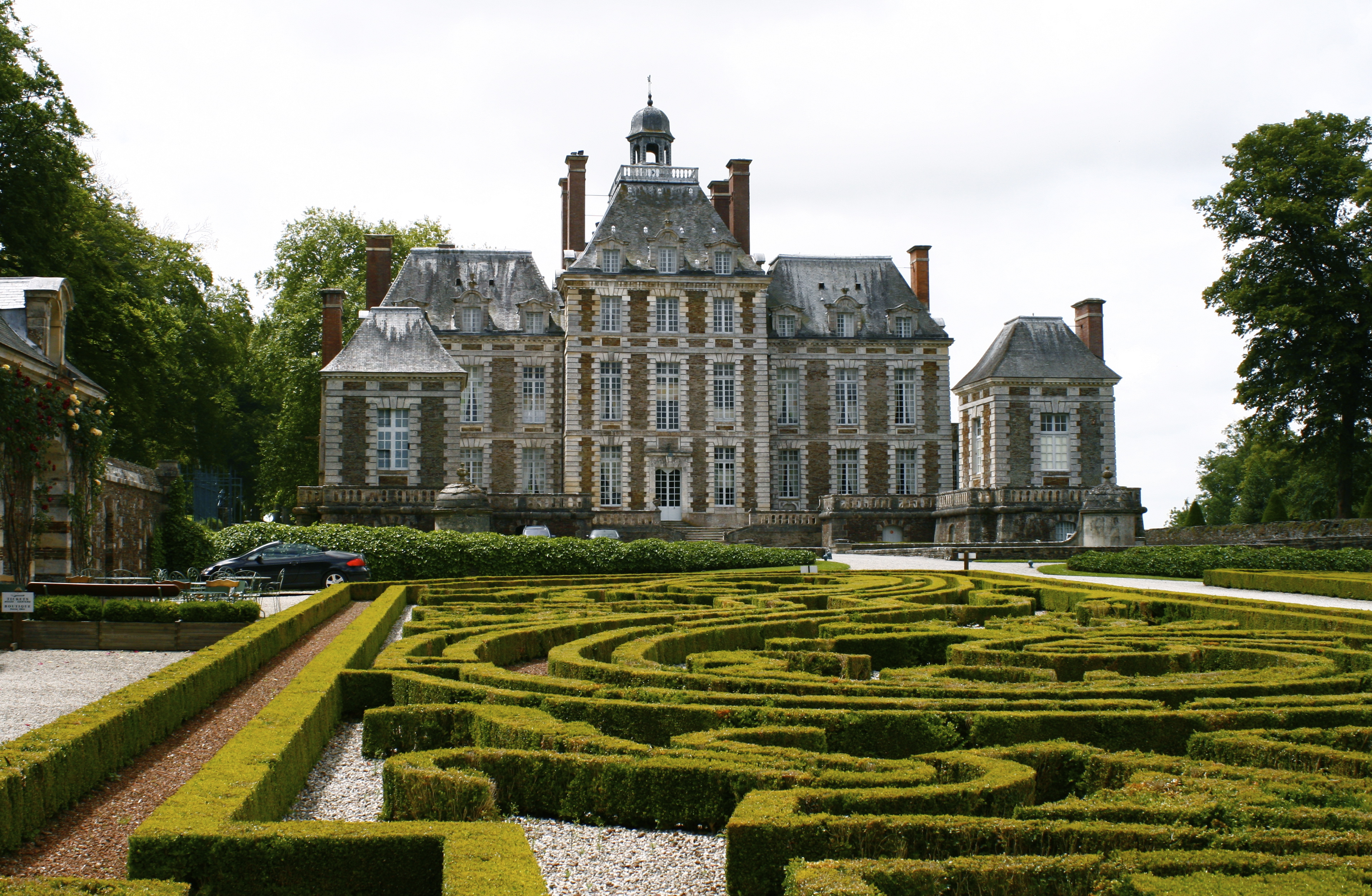
The Chateau de Balleroy

=== Civil heritage ===
The commune has two sites that are registered as historical monuments:

- The Château de Balleroy (1626) was built by the architect François Mansart for Jean de Choisy, advisor to Louis XIII. Its French formal garden are by Henri Duchêne according to plans by André Le Nôtre. It remained in the Balleroy family until 1970. The village was built around the castle.
- The Château de Balleroy Park (1626)

Chateau of Balleroy Picture Gallery

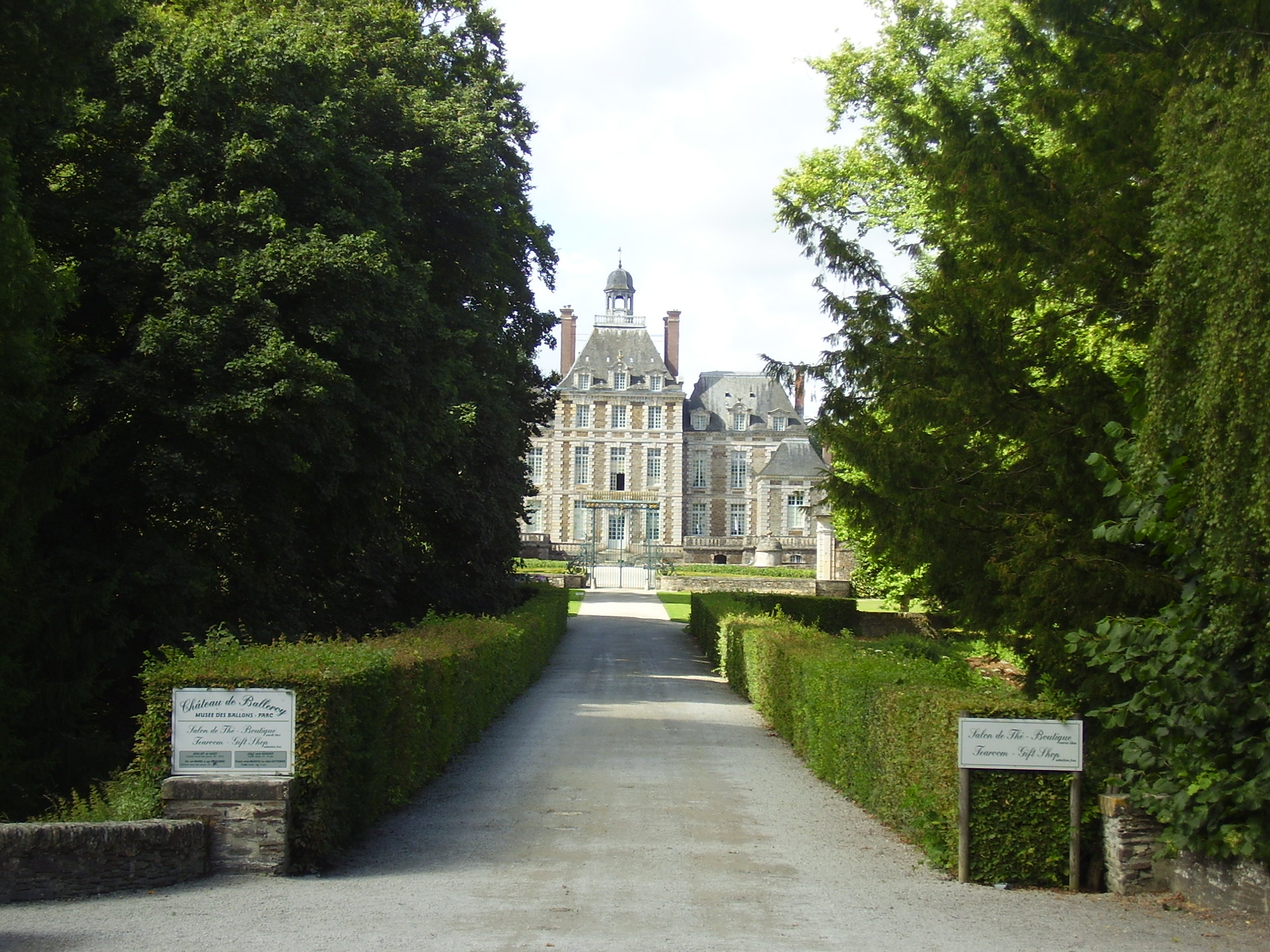

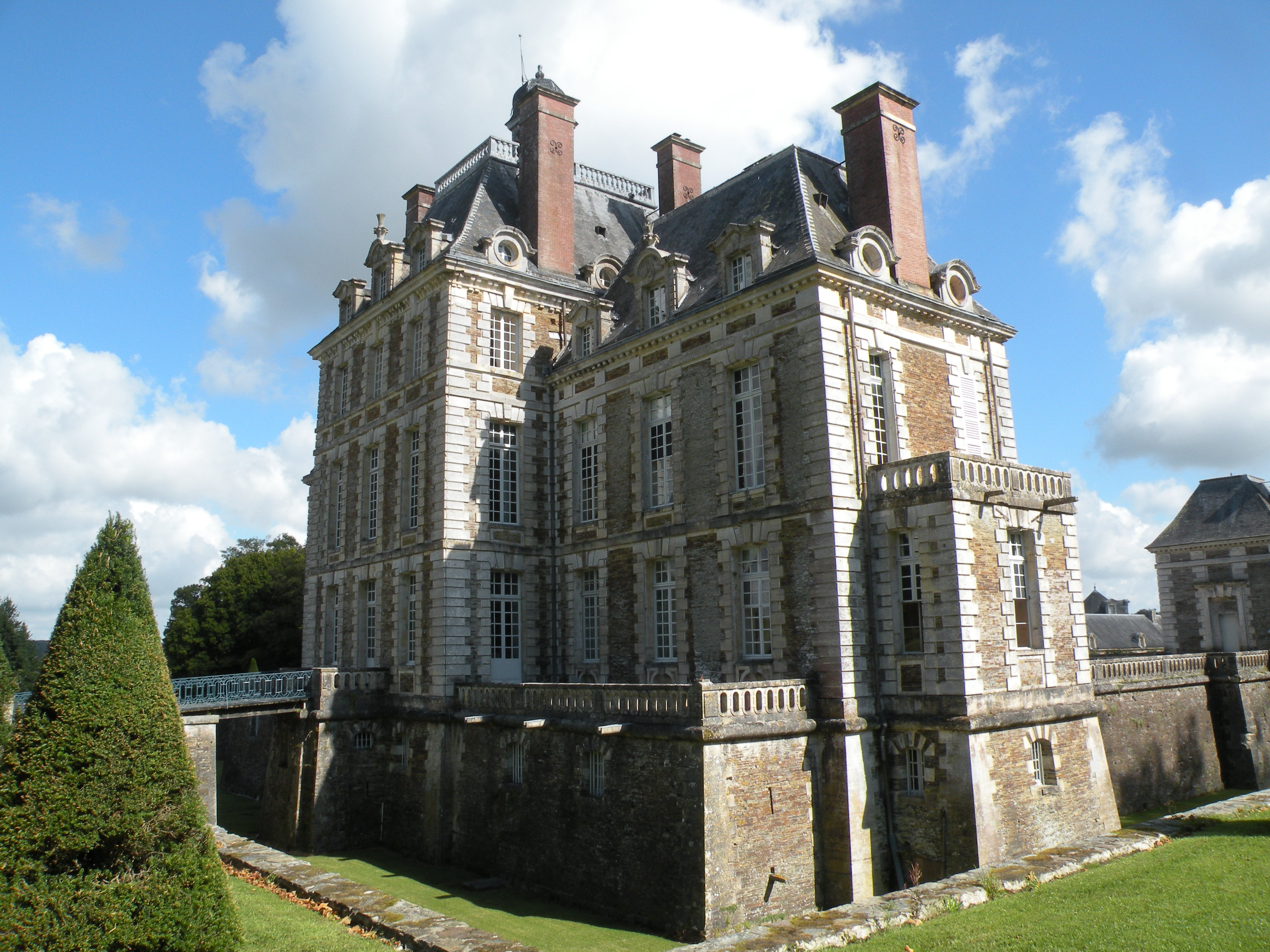

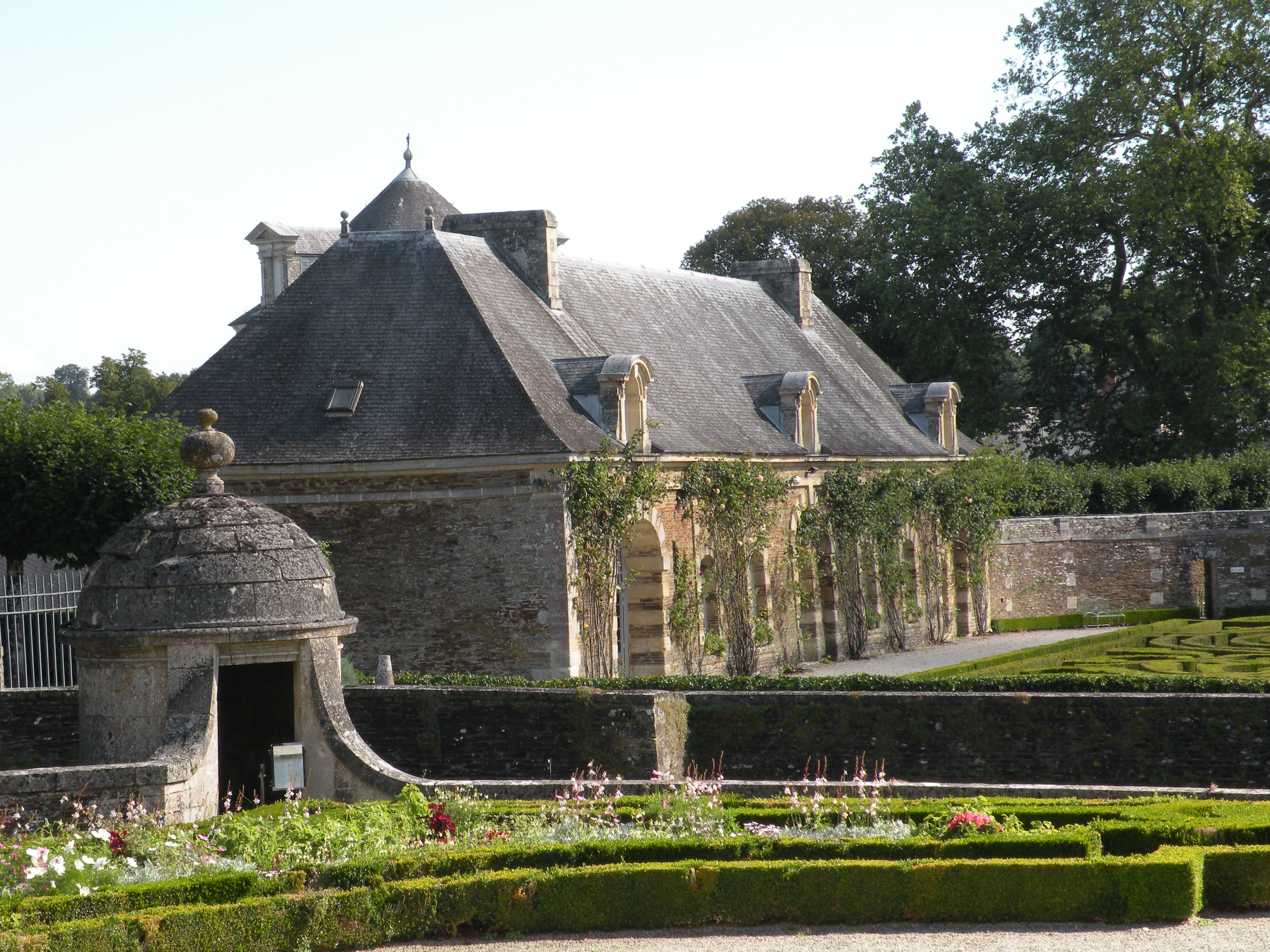

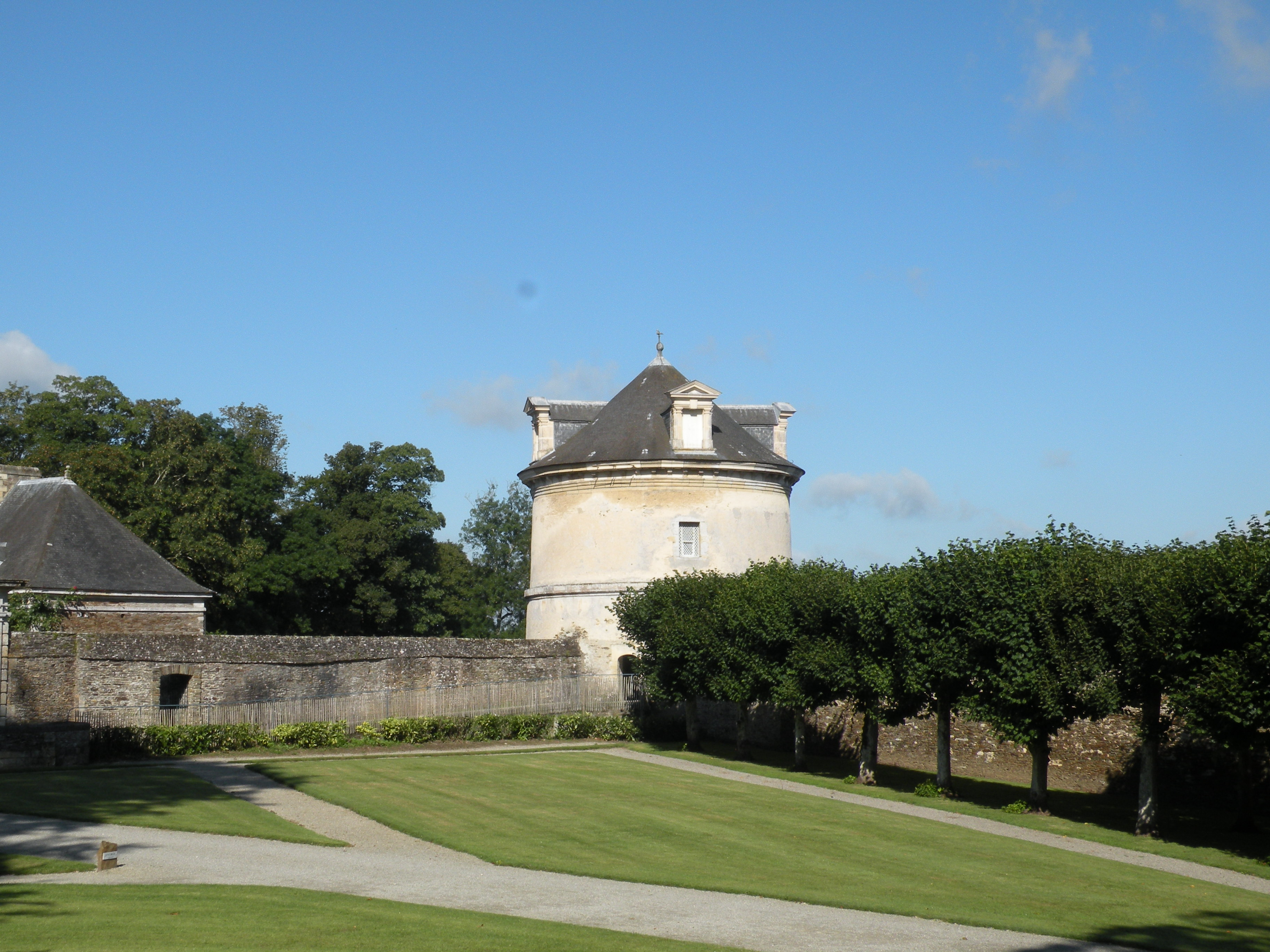

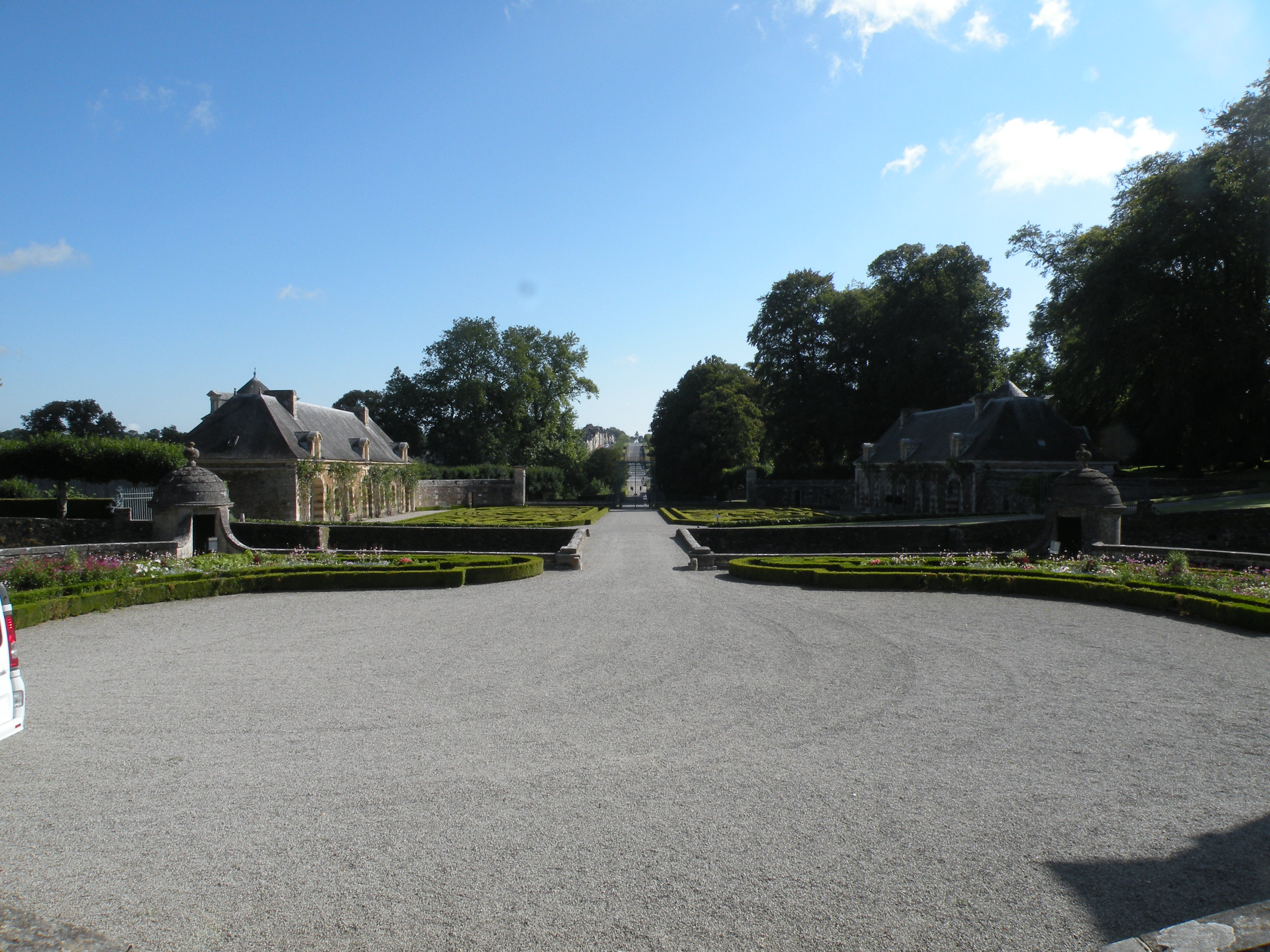

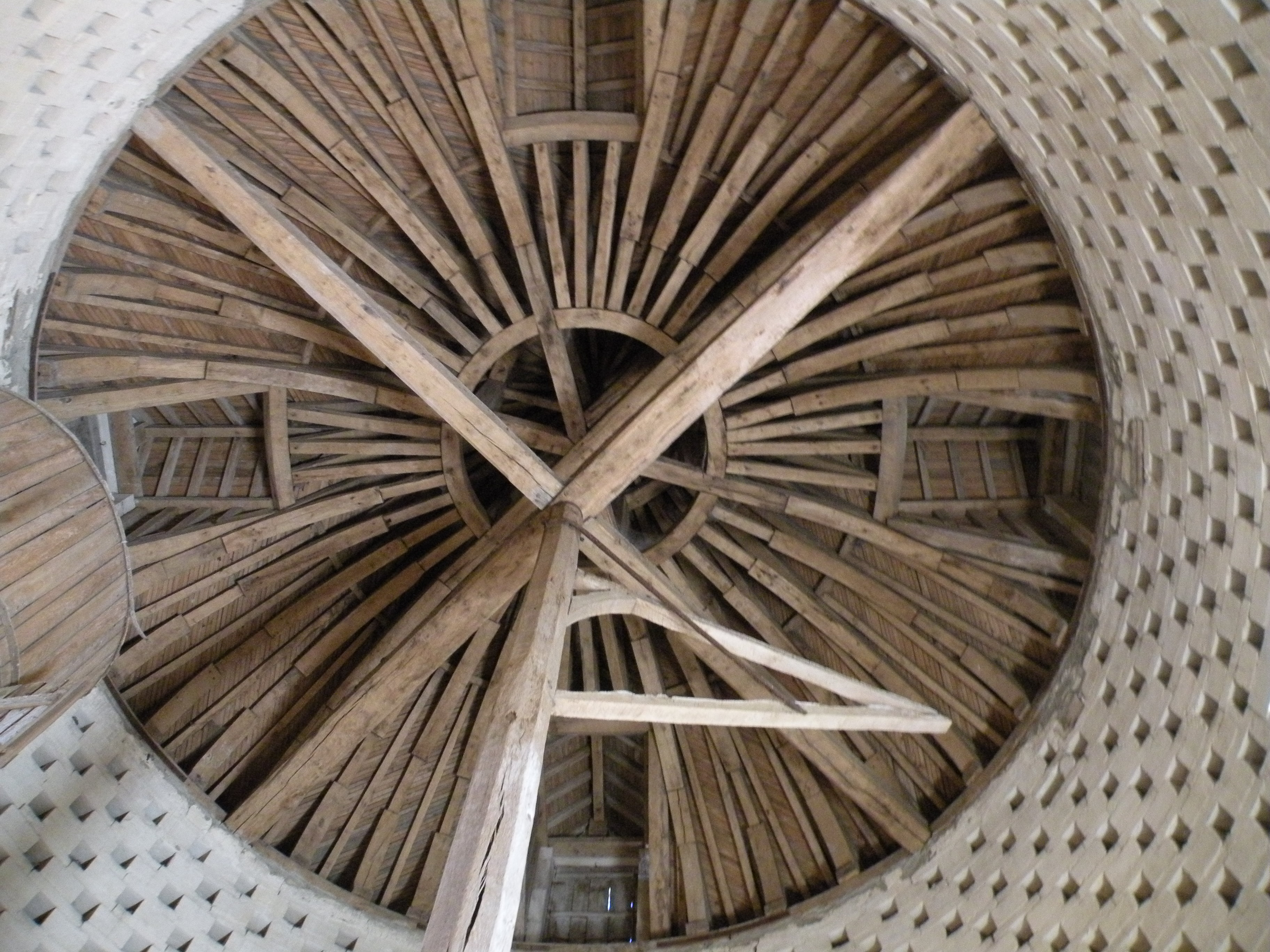

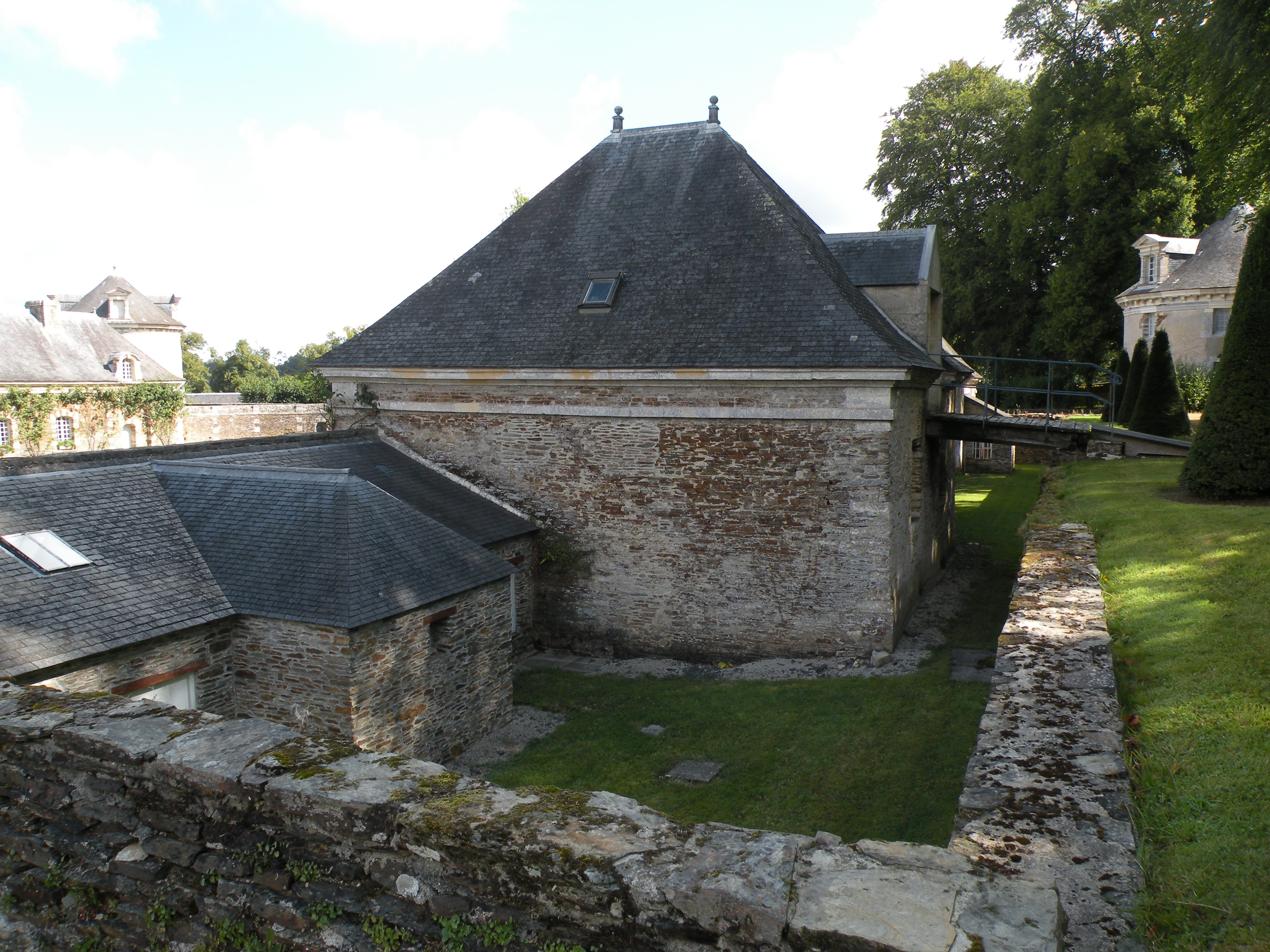

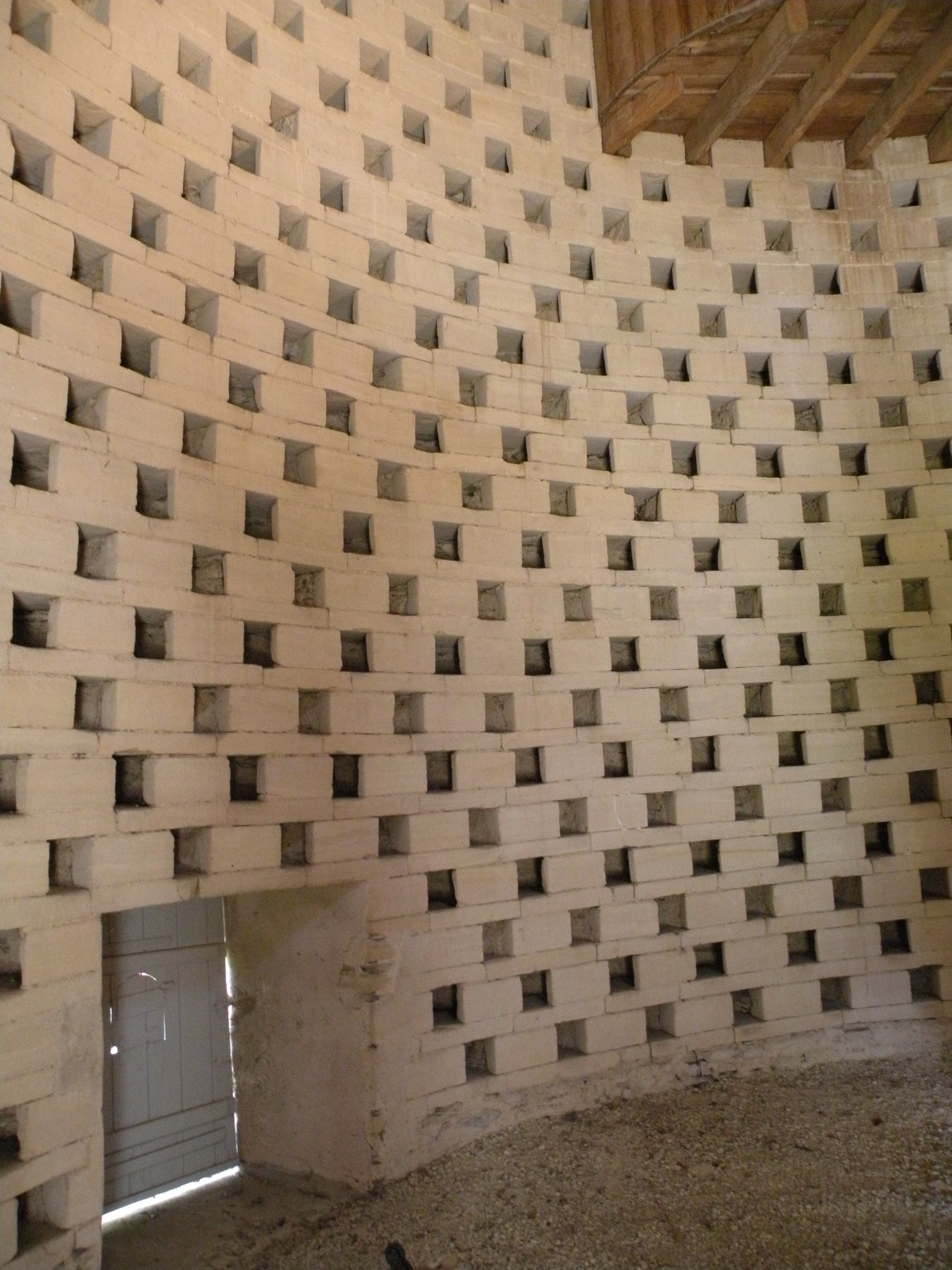

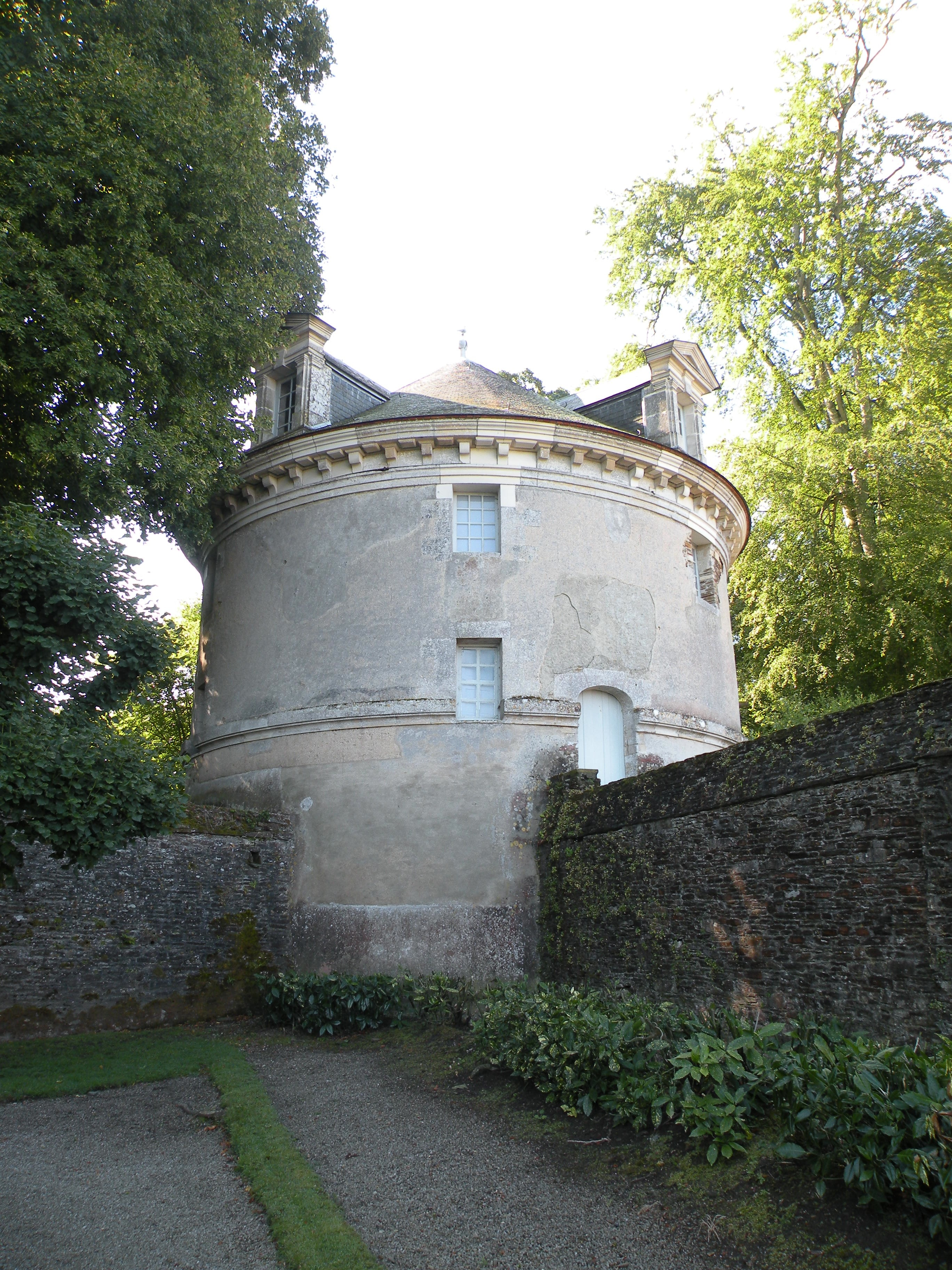

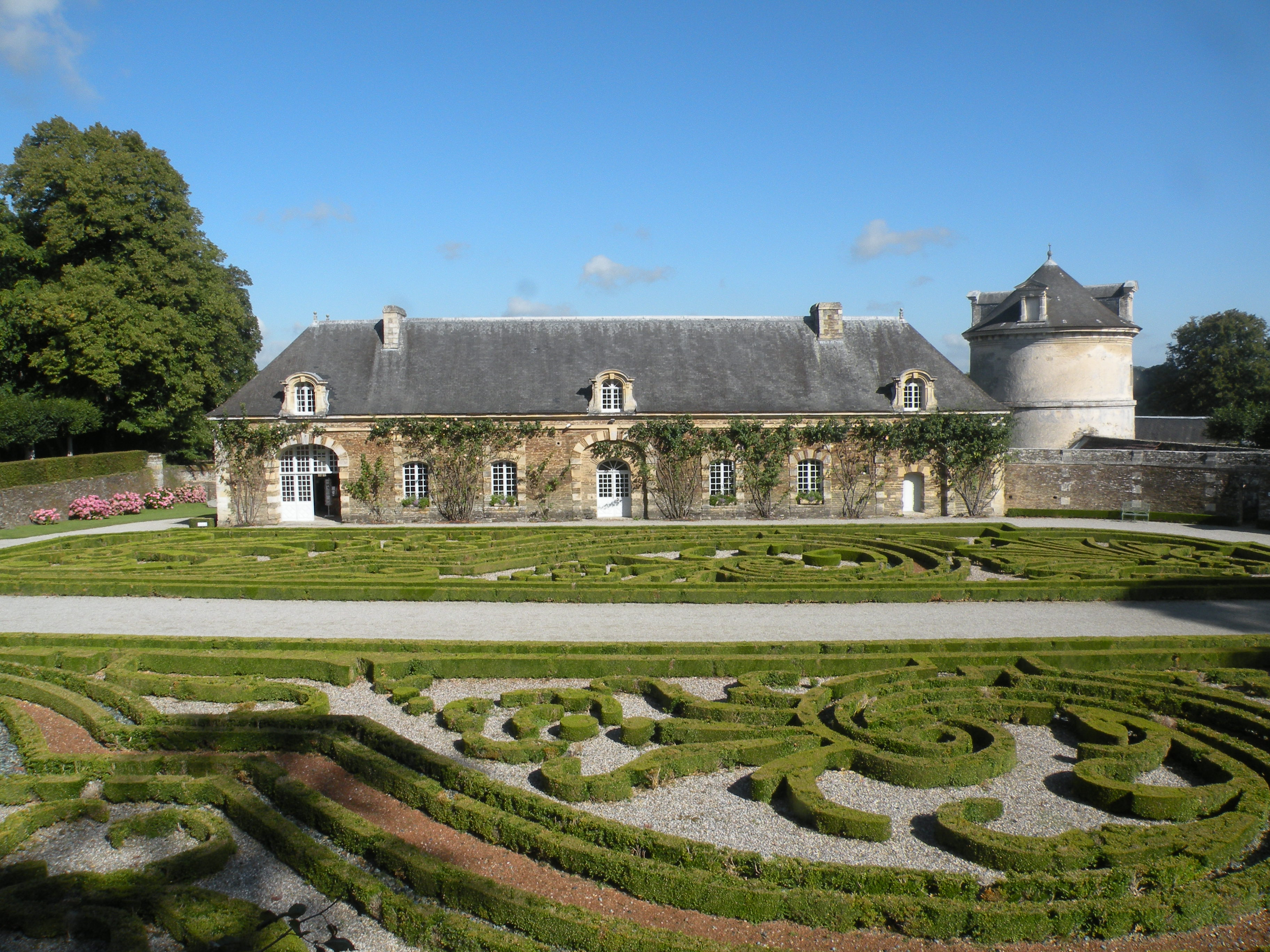

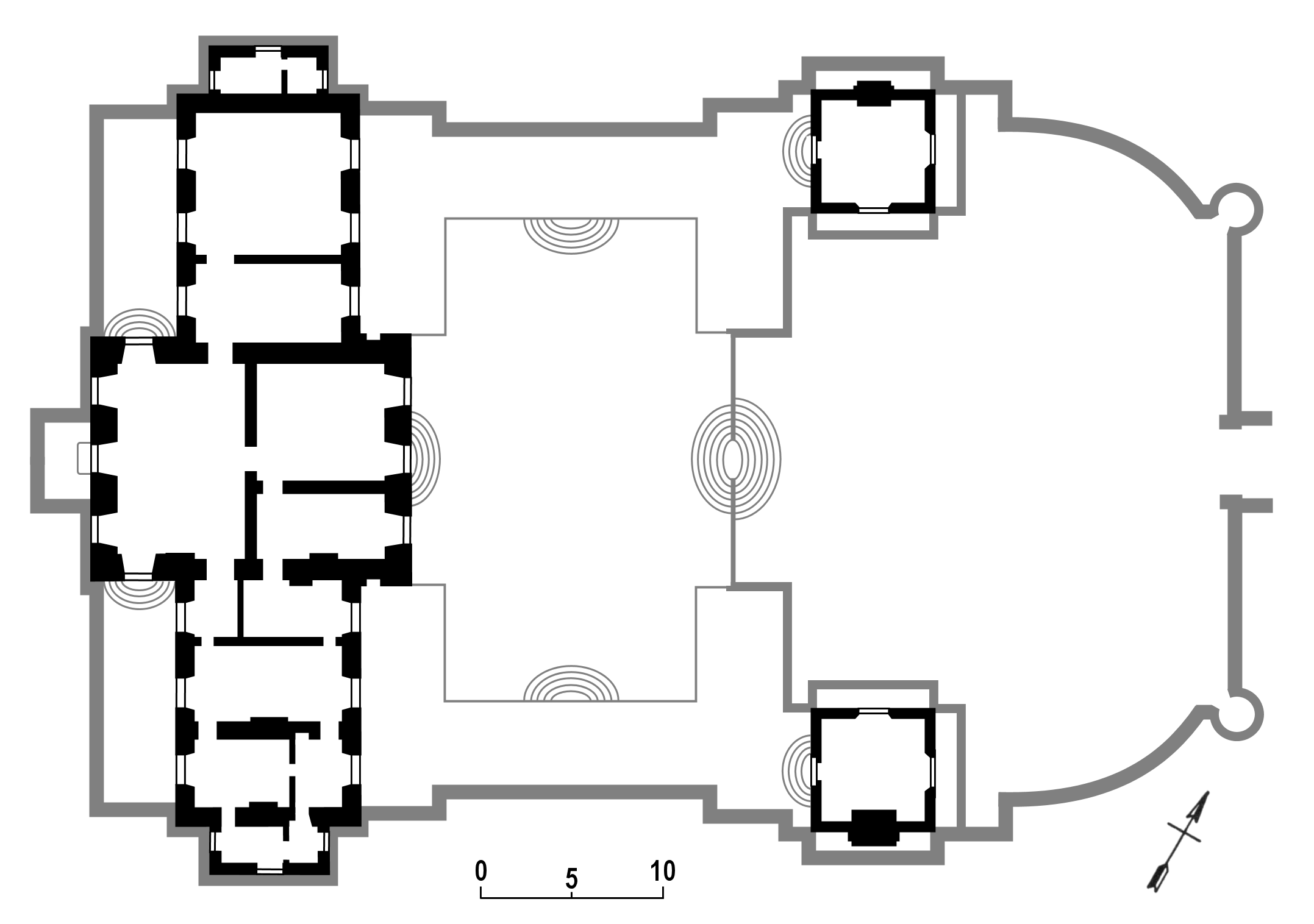

=== Religious heritage ===
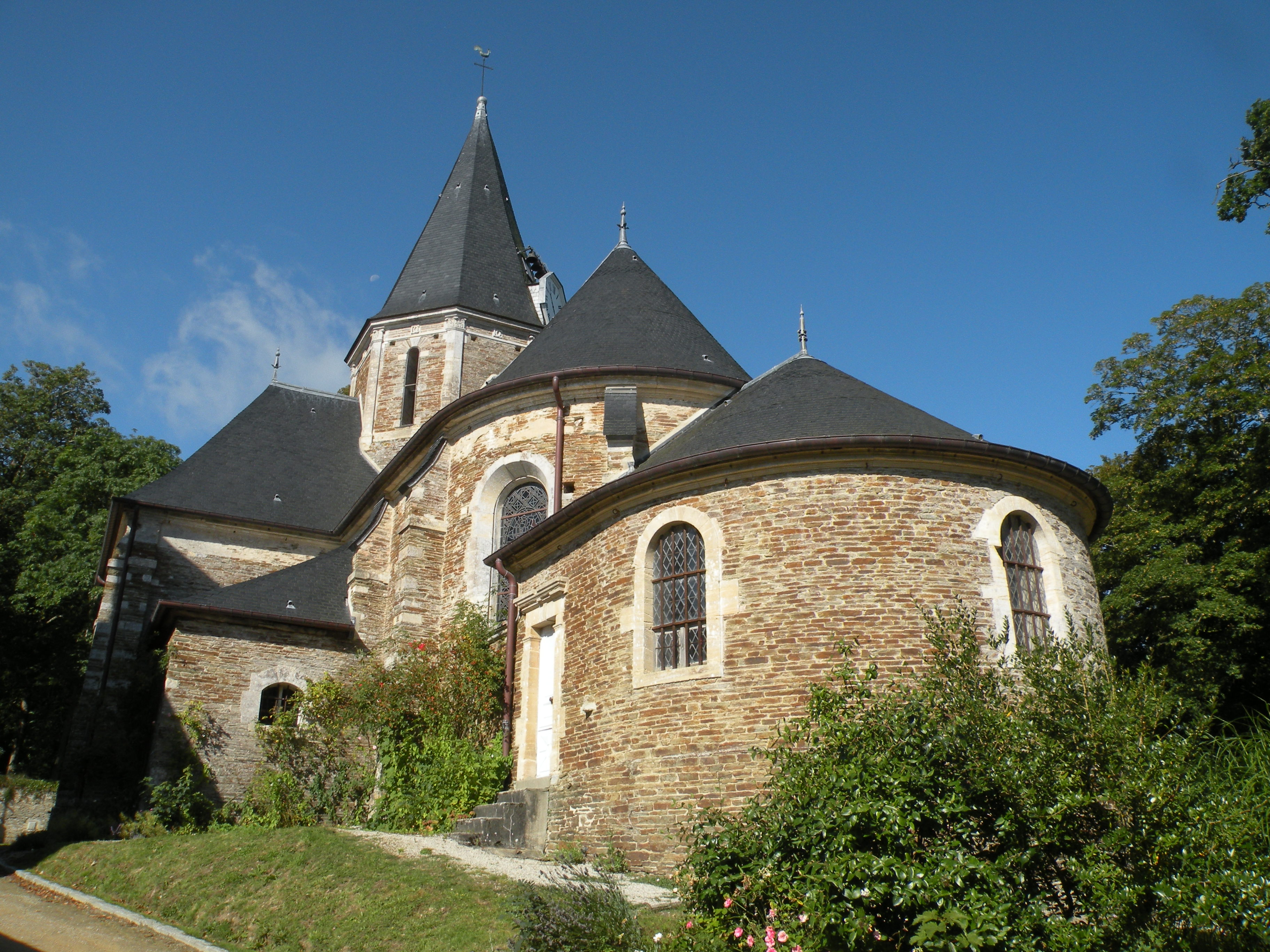
The Church of Saint Martin

- The Parish Church of Saint-Martin Grounds (1650) are registered as an historical monument. The Church contains several items that are registered as historical objects:
  - A Framed Painting: The Alliance between Abimélek and Abraham (17th century)
  - A Framed Painting: The descendant of Abraham (17th century)
  - A Chalice with Paten (17th century)
  - A Statue: Virgin and child (17th century)
  - A Painting: The Annunciation (18th century)
  - An Episcopal Cross (18th century)
  - A Statue: Saint Martin (17th century)

Church of Saint Martin Picture Gallery

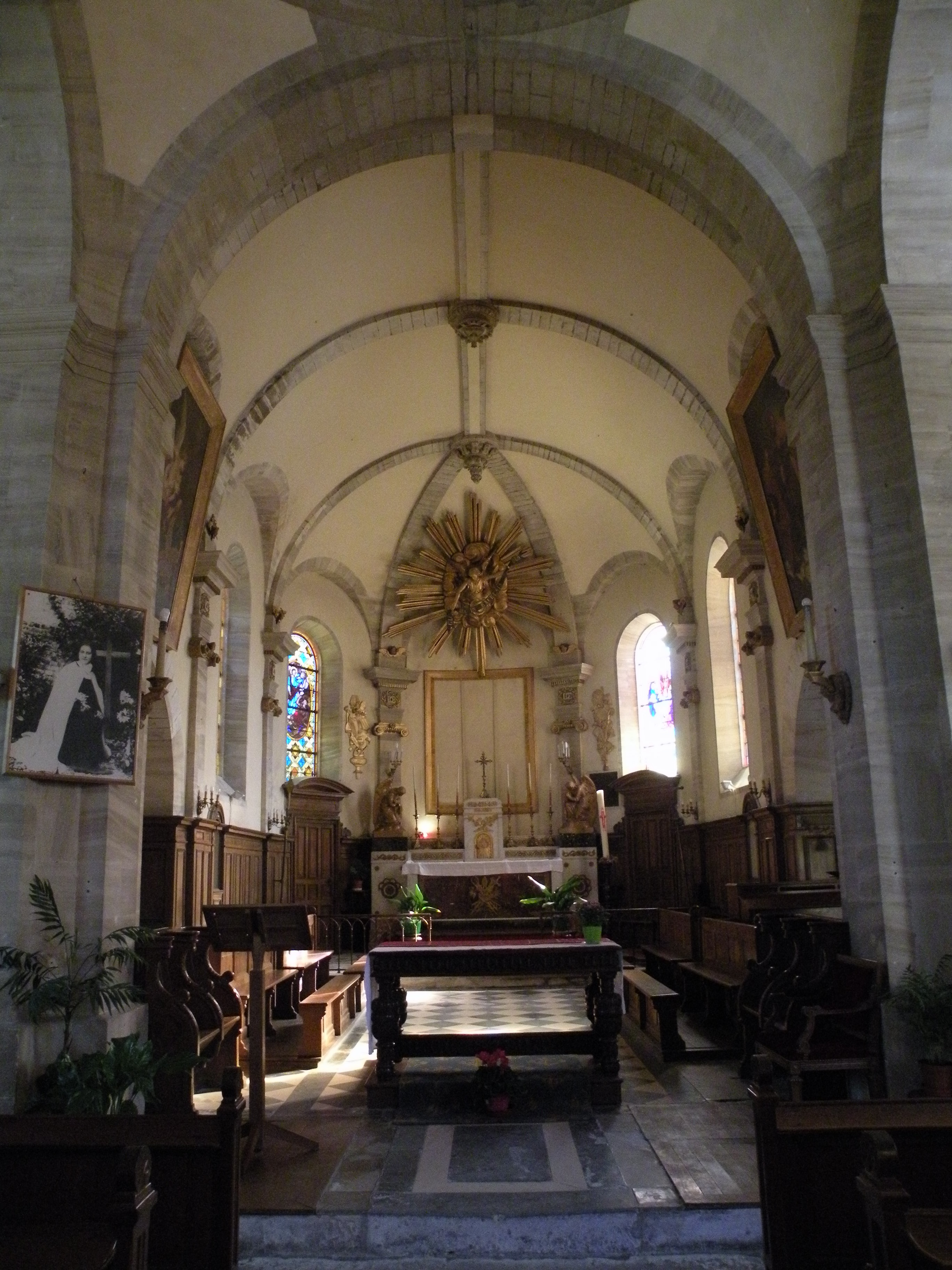
The Nave

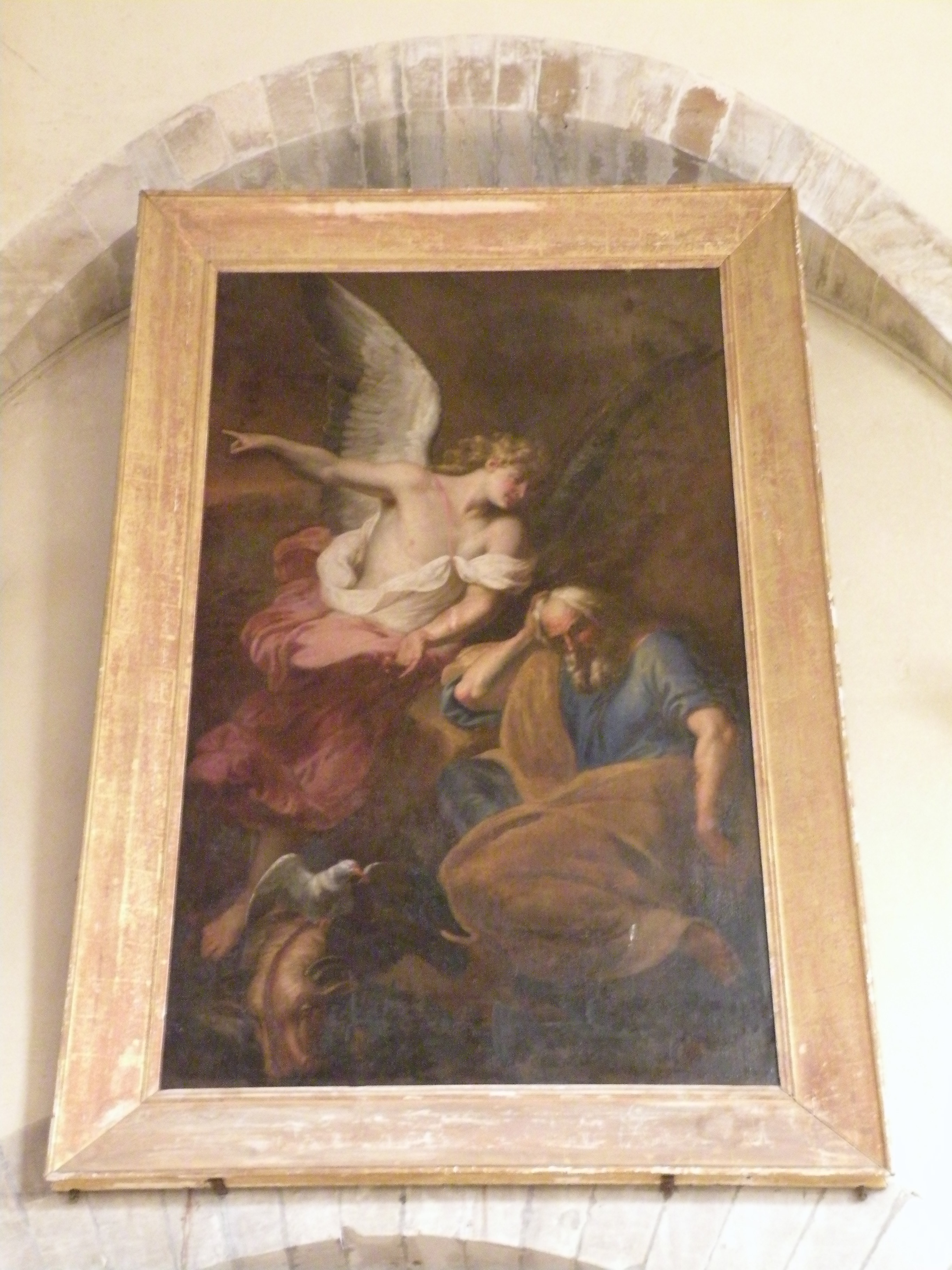
Painting: The Descendant of Abraham

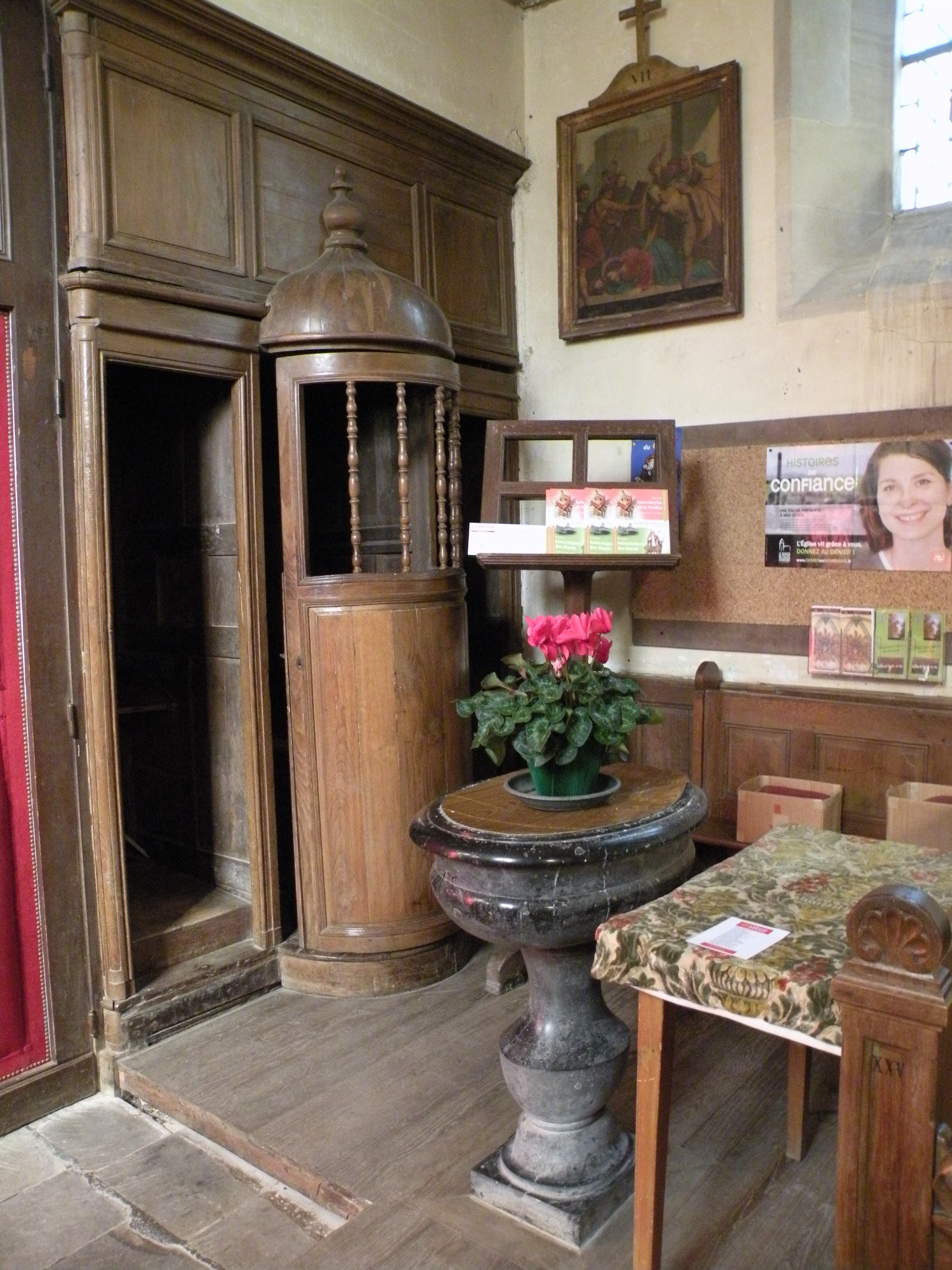
The Confessional

=== Activities and events ===
Each year a gathering of hot air balloons took place at the Château de Balleroy. This gathering took place for the last time in 1999 when Malcolm Forbes, the chateau's owner, would have celebrated his 80th birthday.

Since 2007 in the face of demand from the public, the festival was again held at the end of June but this no longer happens in the castle. This was held by the village festival committee who organized a small gathering. The festivities are now held above the village at the stadium.

== Notable people linked to the commune ==
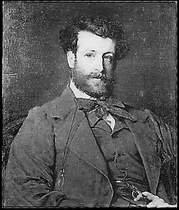
Count Albert de Balleroy

- Louis Charles d'Hervilly (1756-1795), Count of Hervilly, knight, Marquis of Leschelles, married Marie Louise Augustine La Cour de Balleroy (1758-1830) on 7 October 1778 at the Château de Balleroy which was the Château for his wife's family.
- Louis James, from an old Balleroy family (James from Lalande). He left to live in Auxerre (Yonne) where he founded the first modern department store in association with the local merchant Lesseré. As he was unmarried, he brought in a nephew (Achille) and niece (Hortense) to share in the very successful business: it was the time of "Bonheur des Dames" (Happiness of Women). The stores Soisson & James were transferred to Eurodif in 1970.
- Count Albert de Balleroy (1828-1872), MP for Calvados, painter specialising in hunting scenes, shared a studio on Rue Lavoisier in Paris with Édouard Manet
- Malcolm Forbes (1919-1990), American press billionaire, owner of the Chateau from 1970.

== See also ==
- Communes of the Calvados department
