= Balleroy-sur-Drôme =

- Commune
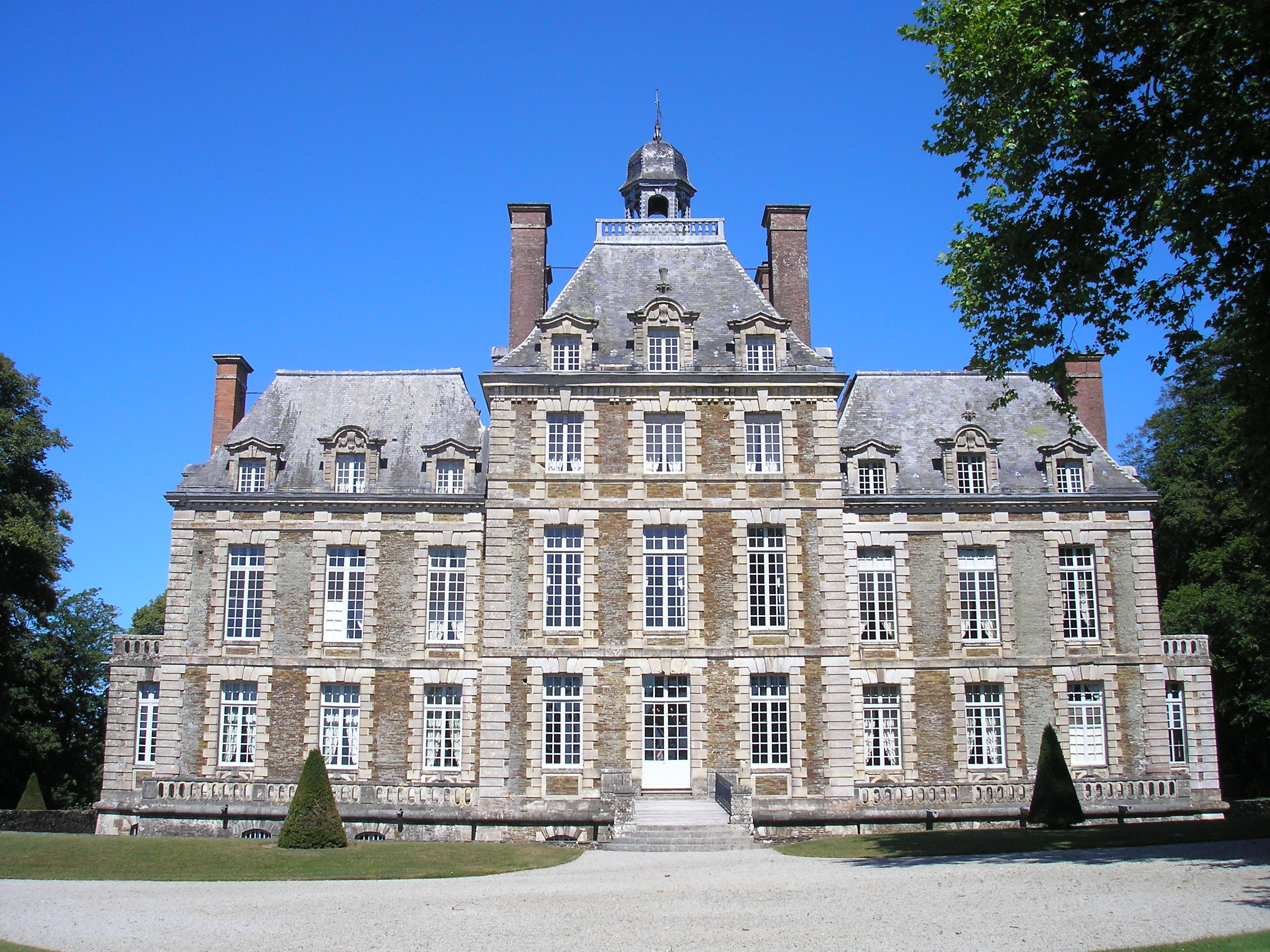
- The chateau in Balleroy-sur-Drôme
- Location of Balleroy-sur-Drôme
- Location within France Location within Normandy
- Coordinates: 49°10′52″N 0°50′17″W
- Country: France
- Region: Normandy
- Department: Calvados
- Arrondissement: Bayeux
- Canton: Trévières
- Intercommunality: CC Isigny-Omaha Intercom

Government
  - Mayor (2022–2026): Yohan Pesquerel
- Area^{1}: 11.77 km^{2} (4.54 sq mi)
- Population (2023): 1,303
  - Density: 110.7/km^{2} (286.7/sq mi)
- Time zone: UTC+01:00 (CET)
  - Summer (DST): UTC+02:00 (CEST)
- INSEE/Postal code: 14035 /14490
- ^{1} French Land Register data, which excludes lakes, ponds, glaciers > 1 km^{2} (0.386 sq mi or 247 acres) and river estuaries.

Balleroy-sur-Drôme (French pronunciation: [baləʁwa syʁ dʁom], literally Balleroy on Drôme) is a commune in the department of Calvados, northwestern France. The municipality was established on 1 January 2016 by merger of the former communes of Balleroy and Vaubadon.

== See also ==
- Communes of the Calvados department
