= Caumont-sur-Aure =

- Commune
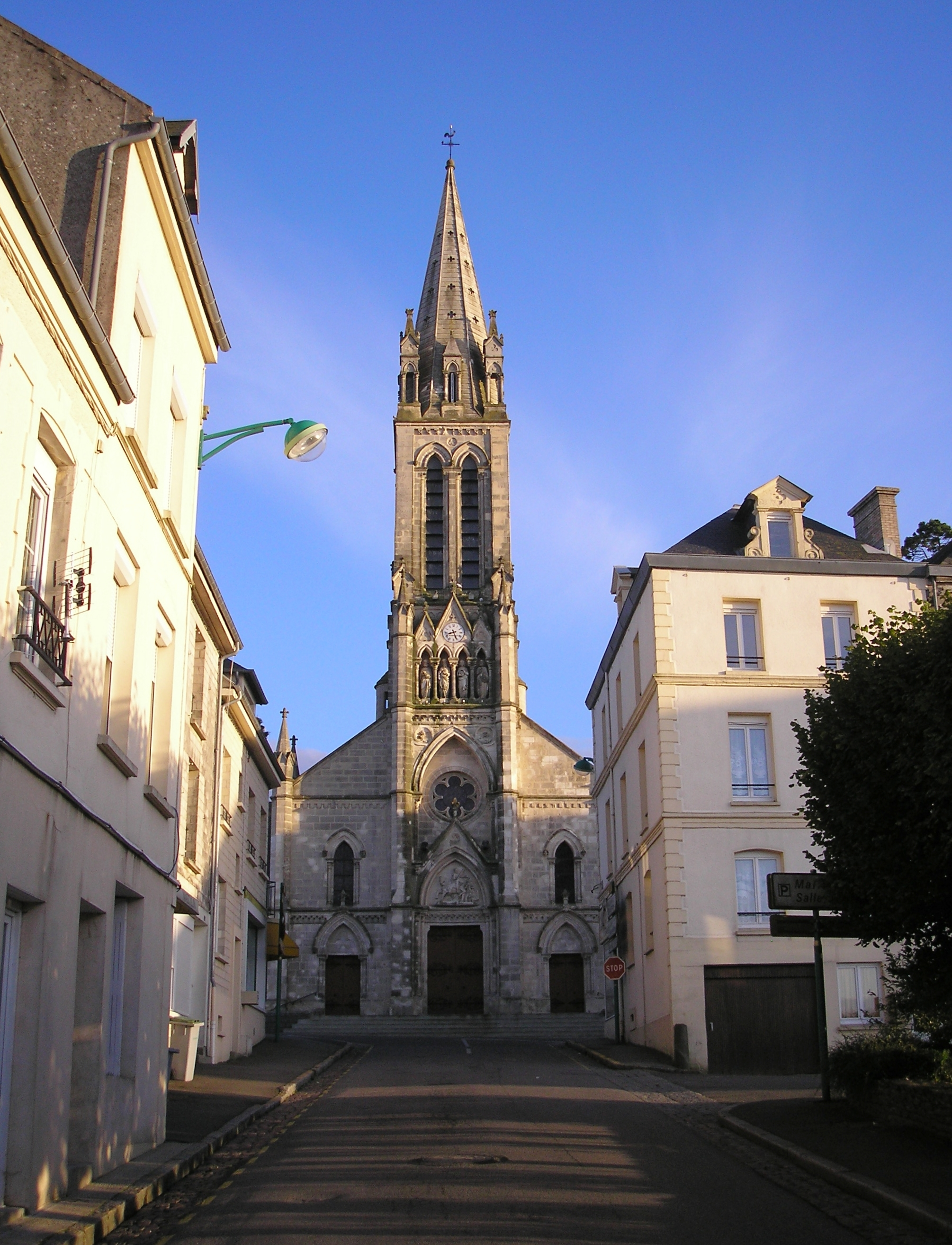
- The church in Caumont-sur-Aure
- Location of Caumont-sur-Aure
- Location within France Location within Normandy
- Coordinates: 49°05′24″N 0°48′18″W
- Country: France
- Region: Normandy
- Department: Calvados
- Arrondissement: Vire
- Canton: Les Monts d'Aunay
- Intercommunality: Pré-Bocage Intercom

Government
  - Mayor (2020–2026): Christophe Le Boulanger
- Area^{1}: 36.02 km^{2} (13.91 sq mi)
- Population (2023): 2,431
  - Density: 67.49/km^{2} (174.8/sq mi)
- Time zone: UTC+01:00 (CET)
  - Summer (DST): UTC+02:00 (CEST)
- INSEE/Postal code: 14143 /14240
- ^{1} French Land Register data, which excludes lakes, ponds, glaciers > 1 km^{2} (0.386 sq mi or 247 acres) and river estuaries.

Caumont-sur-Aure (French pronunciation: [komɔ̃ syʁ ɔʁ], literally Caumont on Aure) is a commune in the department of Calvados, northwestern France. The municipality was established on 1 January 2017 by merger of the former communes of Caumont-l'Éventé (the seat), Livry and La Vacquerie.

== Population ==
Population data refer to the commune in its geography as of January 2025.

Historical population
Year	Pop.	±% p.a.
1968	2,293	—
1975	2,178	−0.73%
1982	2,154	−0.16%
1990	2,158	+0.02%
1999	2,195	+0.19%
2007	2,390	+1.07%
2012	2,461	+0.59%
2017	2,368	−0.77%
2023	2,431	+0.44%
Source: INSEE

== Twin towns – sister cities ==
Caumont-sur-Aure is twinned with:

- Mömbris, Germany since 1989

== See also ==
- Communes of the Calvados department
