= Livry, Calvados =

Livry
- Part of Caumont-sur-Aure
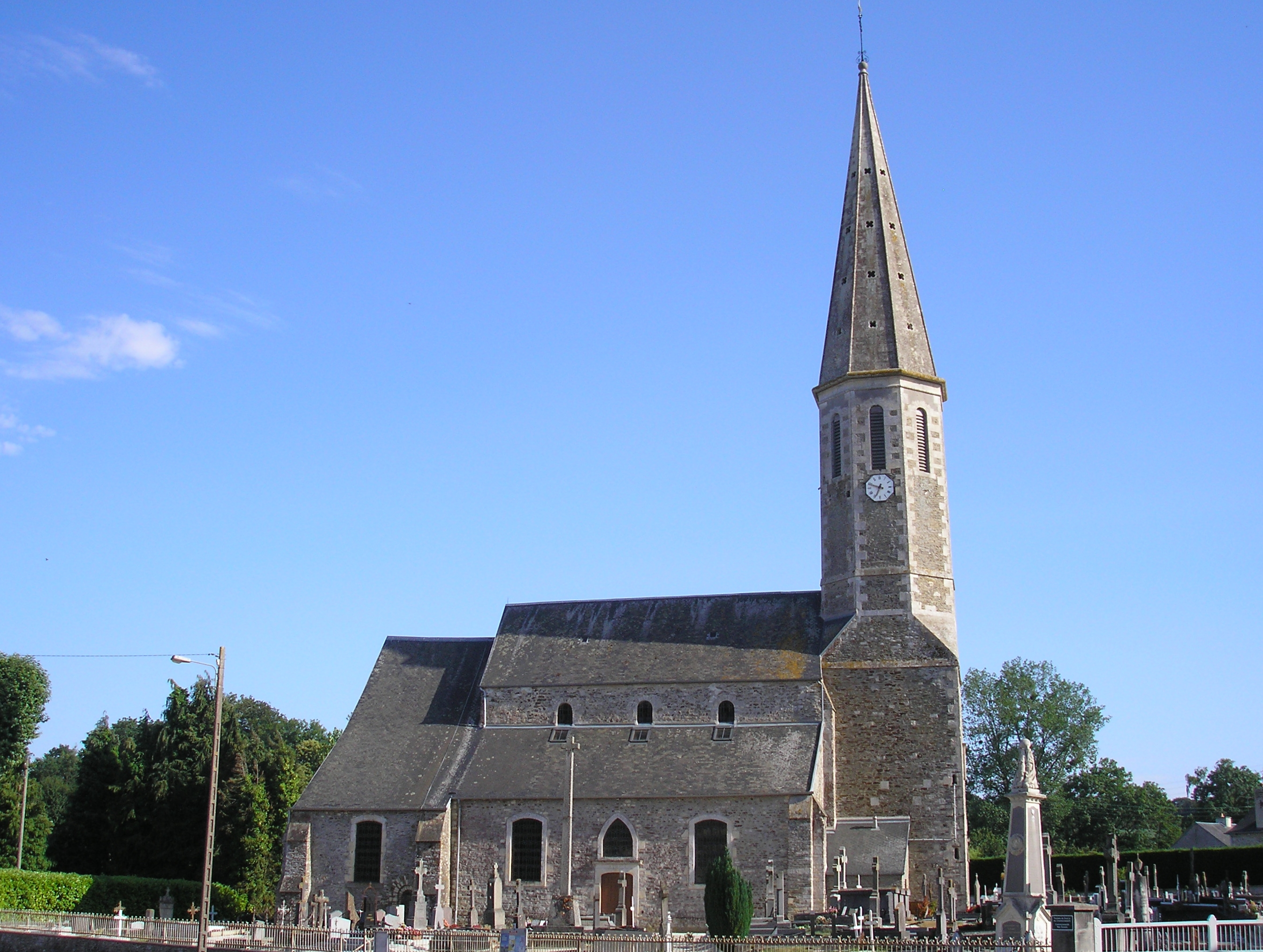
- Location of Livry
- Location within France Location within Normandy
- Coordinates: 49°06′32″N 0°45′52″W
- Country: France
- Region: Normandy
- Department: Calvados
- Arrondissement: Vire
- Canton: Les Monts d'Aunay
- Commune: Caumont-sur-Aure
- Area^{1}: 23.48 km^{2} (9.07 sq mi)
- Highest elevation: 242 m (794 ft)
- Lowest elevation: 90 m (300 ft)
- Population (2023): 752
  - Density: 32.0/km^{2} (83.0/sq mi)
- Time zone: UTC+01:00 (CET)
  - Summer (DST): UTC+02:00 (CEST)
- Postal code: 14240
- ^{1} French Land Register data, which excludes lakes, ponds, glaciers > 1 km^{2} (0.386 sq mi or 247 acres) and river estuaries.

Livry (French pronunciation: [livʁi]) is a former commune in the Calvados department in the Normandy region in northwestern France. On 1 January 2017, it was merged into the new commune Caumont-sur-Aure.

== See also ==
- Communes of the Calvados department
