= Aure (river) =

River in France

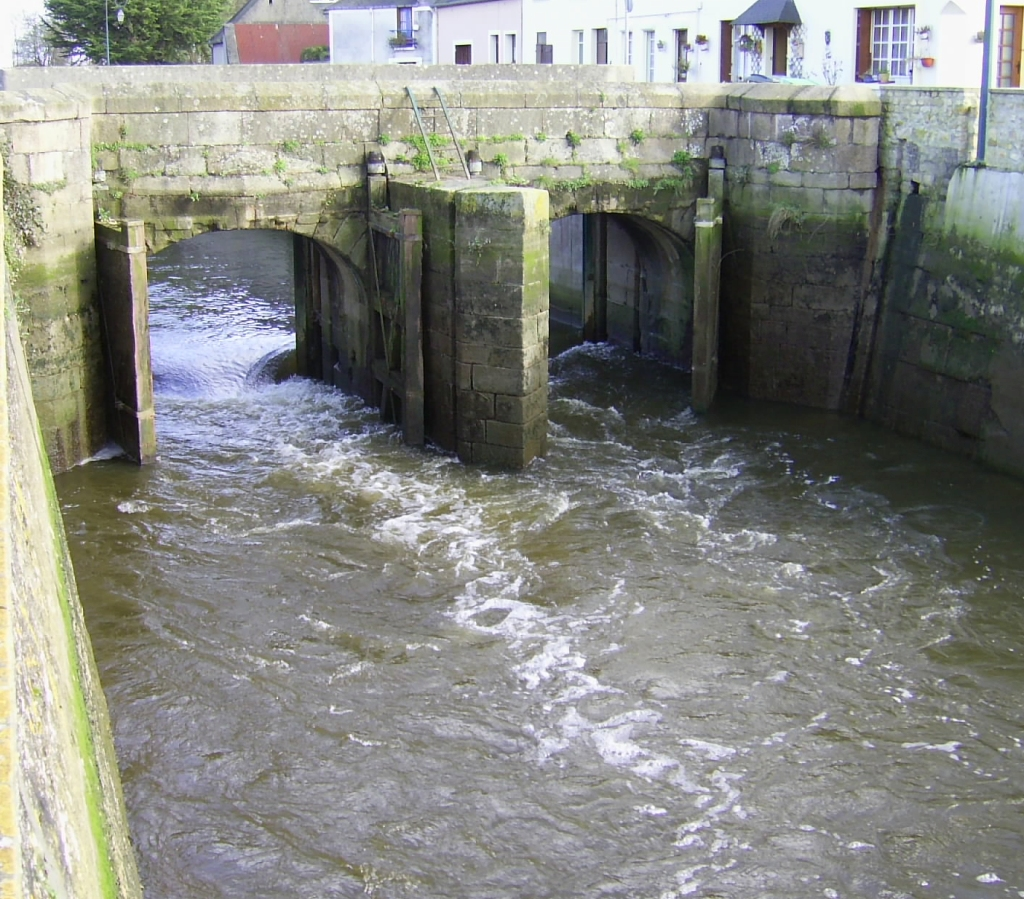
- The Aure at Isigny-sur-Mer

- Location within France Location within Normandy

Location
- Country: France

Physical characteristics
- Source
  - location: Calvados
- Mouth
  - location: Vire
  - coordinates: 49°19′31″N 1°6′45″W
- Length: 82 km (51 mi)

Basin features
- Progression: Vire→ English Channel

The Aure (French pronunciation: [ɔʁ]) is a river in northwestern France, in the department of Calvados. It is 82.1 km (51.0 mi) long. Its source is in Caumont-l'Éventé, and it flows into the river Vire in Isigny-sur-Mer. The largest town on the Aure is Bayeux.

== History ==
In modern history, crossing of the Aure is noted in the advances of units of infantry of the United States as they undertook liberation of France from Germany in June, 1944. The river leads to a small mill that formerly was used to make cotton.

== Hydrology and water quality ==
The Aure river has relatively high turbidity and its brownish water is moderate in velocity due to the slight gradient of the watercourse, although the narrow channel in locations like Bayeux centre engenders higher surface velocities; pH levels have been measured at 8.35 in the centre of Bayeux near the Bayeux Tapestry Museum and electrical conductivity of the waters have tested at 37 microsiemens per centimetre. Turbidity has been measured at 13 centimetres by the Secchi disc method. At this reference location of Bayeux, summer flows are typically in the range of 50 cubic feet per second (1.4 m^{3}/s).

== Tributaries ==
- Le Lieu Gueroult (ruisseau)
- Ruisseau de la Baronnie
- Le Vession (ruisseau)
- L'Aurette (L)
- Ruisseau de Fumichon
- Ruisseau du Ponchot
- La Drôme (L) ~ 58 km long ~ its main affluent
- Le Cachiau (ruisseau)
- Le Douet du Val (ruisseau)
- Le Douet de Riloques (ruisseau)
- Le Douet de Courtelay (ruisseau)
- La Tortonne (L)
- L'Esque (L)
- Ruisseau du Moulin Dannebey
- Ruisseau de la Bellaie
