= Caumont-l'Éventé =

- Part of Caumont-sur-Aure
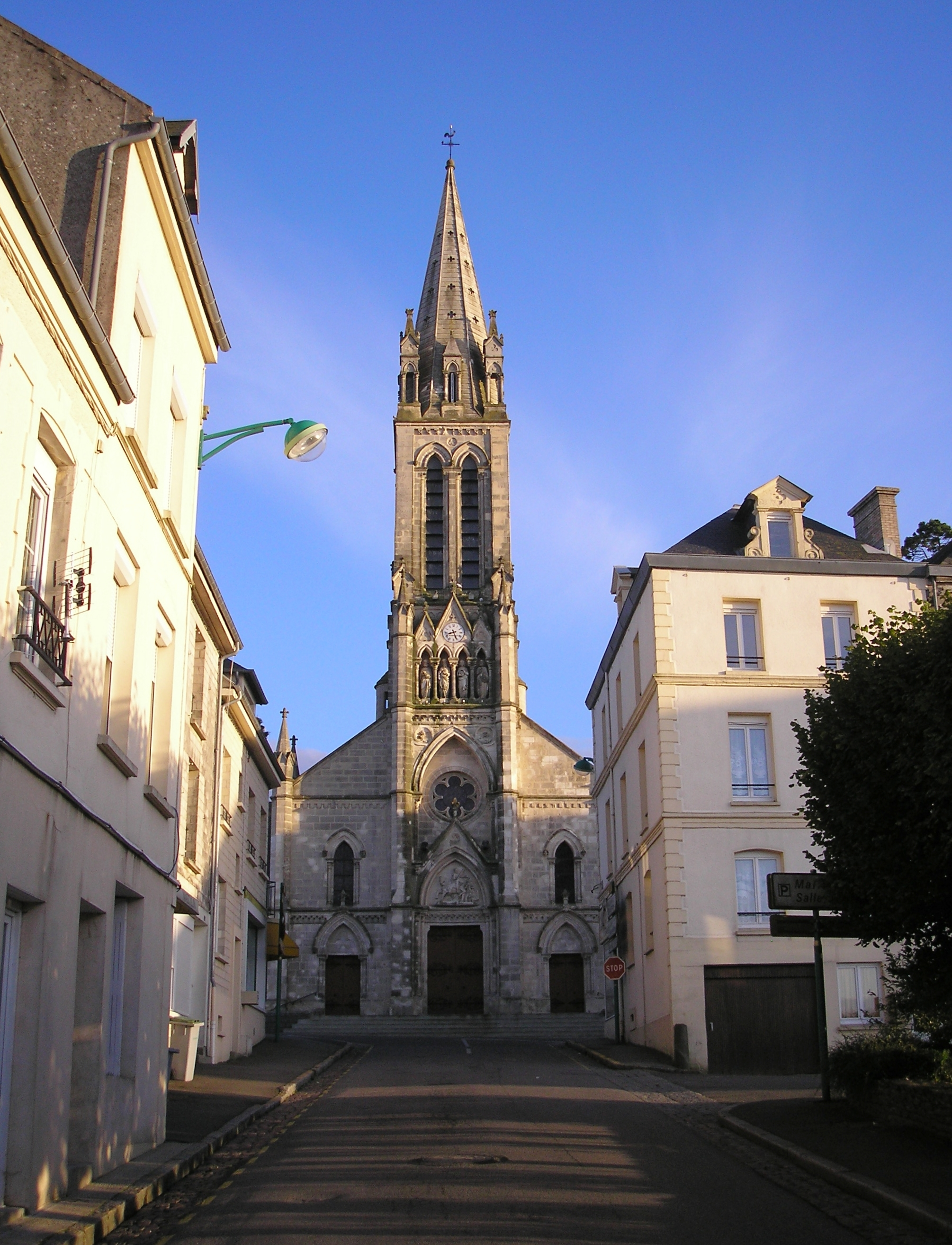

- Coat of arms
- Location of Caumont-l'Éventé
- Location within France Location within Normandy
- Coordinates: 49°05′28″N 0°48′14″W
- Country: France
- Region: Normandy
- Department: Calvados
- Arrondissement: Bayeux
- Canton: Les Monts d'Aunay
- Commune: Caumont-sur-Aure
- Area^{1}: 6.27 km^{2} (2.42 sq mi)
- Elevation: 245 m (804 ft)
- Highest elevation: 247 m (810 ft)
- Lowest elevation: 125 m (410 ft)
- Population (2022): 1,371
  - Density: 219/km^{2} (566/sq mi)
- Time zone: UTC+01:00 (CET)
  - Summer (DST): UTC+02:00 (CEST)
- Postal code: 14240
- ^{1} French Land Register data, which excludes lakes, ponds, glaciers > 1 km^{2} (0.386 sq mi or 247 acres) and river estuaries.

Caumont-l'Éventé (French pronunciation: [komɔ̃ levɑ̃te]) is a former commune in the Calvados department in northwestern France. On 1 January 2017, it was merged into the new commune Caumont-sur-Aure.

== Population ==
Historical population

| Year | Pop. | ±% p.a. |
|---|---|---|
| 1793 | 752 | — |
| 1821 | 792 | +0.19% |
| 1846 | 1,010 | +0.98% |
| 1872 | 1,034 | +0.09% |
| 1901 | 967 | −0.23% |
| 1926 | 827 | −0.62% |
| 1946 | 856 | +0.17% |
| 1962 | 1,134 | +1.77% |

| Year | Pop. | ±% p.a. |
|---|---|---|
| 1968 | 1,172 | +0.55% |
| 1975 | 1,178 | +0.07% |
| 1982 | 1,135 | −0.53% |
| 1990 | 1,145 | +0.11% |
| 1999 | 1,192 | +0.45% |
| 2006 | 1,295 | +1.19% |
| 2022 | 1,371 | +0.36% |

Source: EHESS and INSEE

== International relations ==
It is twinned with the Devon town of Uffculme.

== Administration ==
Caumont-l'Éventé was the seat of the former canton of Caumont-l'Éventé, which included 14 communes with 6373 inhabitants (2008).

== See also ==
- Communes of the Calvados department
