= Sully, Calvados =

Sully
- Commune
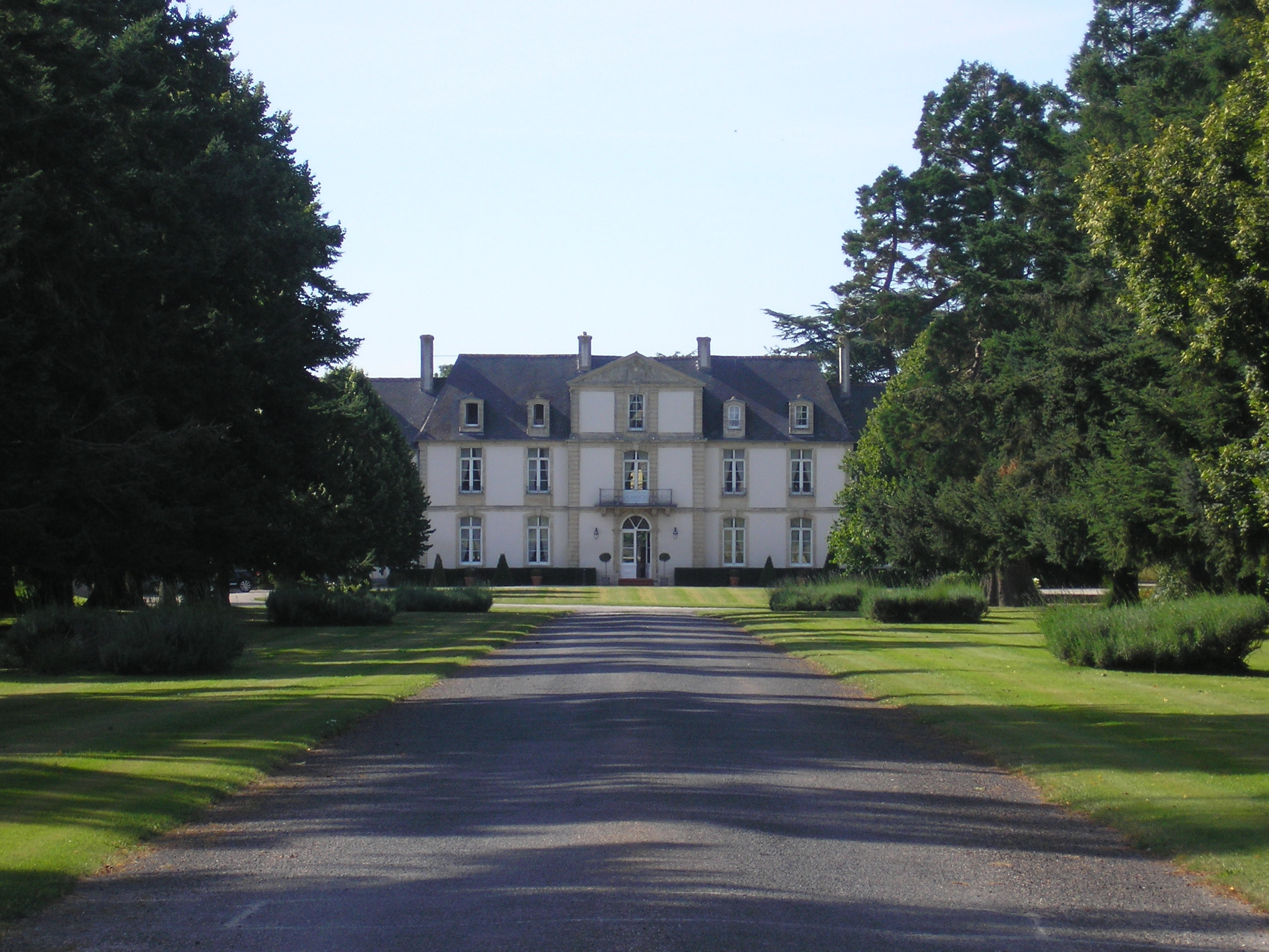
- The chateau in Sully
- Location of Sully
- Location within France Location within Normandy
- Coordinates: 49°18′01″N 0°44′09″W
- Country: France
- Region: Normandy
- Department: Calvados
- Arrondissement: Bayeux
- Canton: Bayeux
- Intercommunality: CC Bayeux Intercom

Government
  - Mayor (2020–2026): Gilles Moulin
- Area^{1}: 4 km^{2} (1.5 sq mi)
- Elevation: 39 m (128 ft)
- Highest elevation: 58 m (190 ft)
- Lowest elevation: 18 m (59 ft)
- Population (2023): 171
  - Density: 43/km^{2} (110/sq mi)
- Time zone: UTC+01:00 (CET)
  - Summer (DST): UTC+02:00 (CEST)
- INSEE/Postal code: 14680 /14400
- ^{1} French Land Register data, which excludes lakes, ponds, glaciers > 1 km^{2} (0.386 sq mi or 247 acres) and river estuaries.

Sully (French pronunciation: [syli]) is a commune in the Calvados department in the Normandy region in northwestern France.

== Population ==
Historical population
Year	Pop.	±% p.a.
1968	147	—
1975	121	−2.74%
1982	132	+1.25%
1990	134	+0.19%
1999	148	+1.11%
2007	117	−2.90%
2012	131	+2.29%
2017	140	+1.34%
2023	171	+3.39%
Source: INSEE

== See also ==
- Communes of the Calvados department
