= Vaubadon =

- Part of Balleroy-sur-Drôme
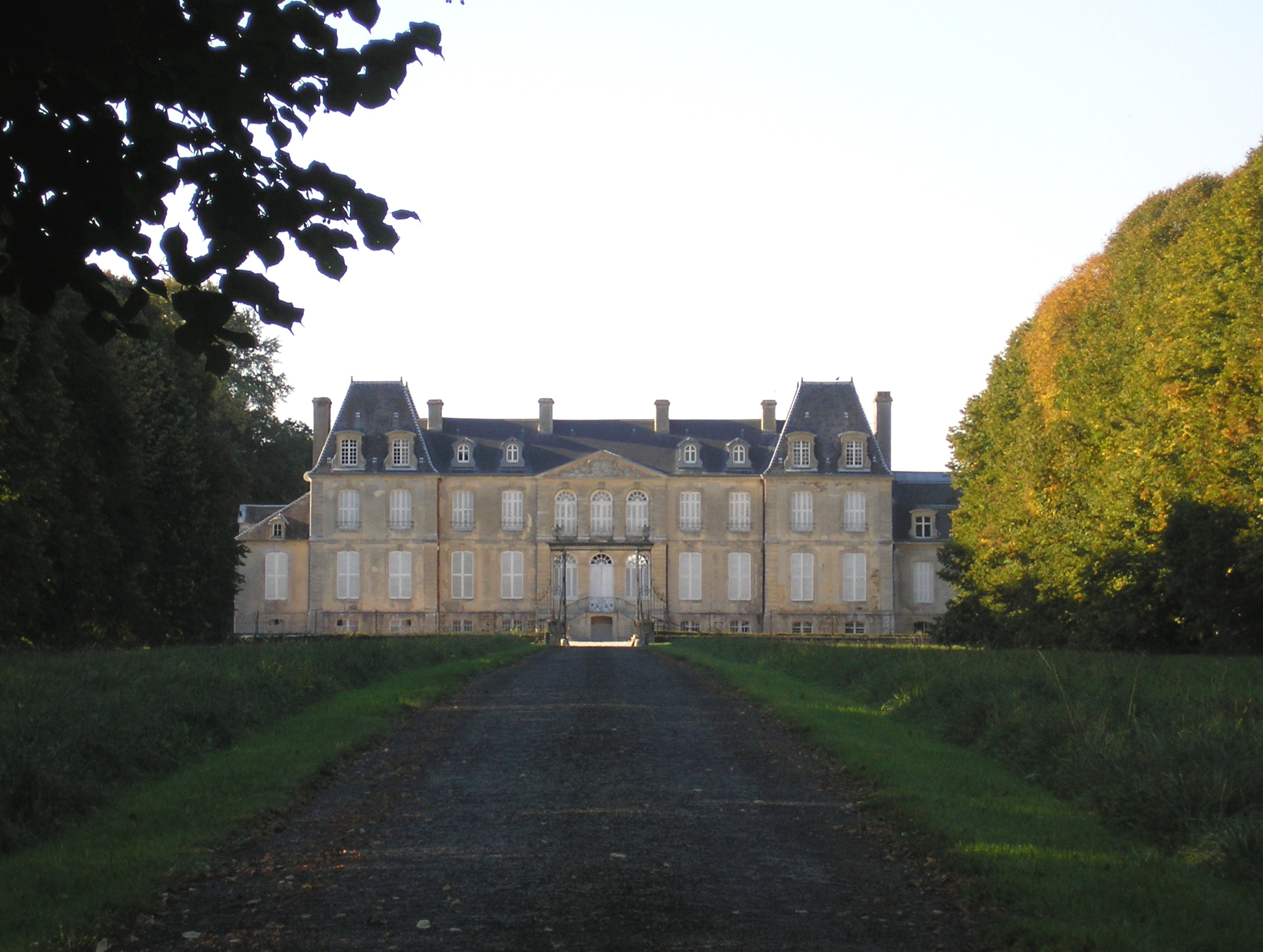
- Location of Vaubadon
- Location within France Location within Normandy
- Coordinates: 49°12′26″N 0°50′13″W
- Country: France
- Region: Normandy
- Department: Calvados
- Arrondissement: Bayeux
- Canton: Trévières
- Commune: Balleroy-sur-Drôme
- Area^{1}: 7.54 km^{2} (2.91 sq mi)
- Highest elevation: 124 m (407 ft)
- Lowest elevation: 43 m (141 ft)
- Population (2023): 414
  - Density: 54.9/km^{2} (142/sq mi)
- Time zone: UTC+01:00 (CET)
  - Summer (DST): UTC+02:00 (CEST)
- Postal code: 14490
- ^{1} French Land Register data, which excludes lakes, ponds, glaciers > 1 km^{2} (0.386 sq mi or 247 acres) and river estuaries.

Vaubadon (French pronunciation: [vobadɔ̃]) is a former commune in the Calvados department in the Normandy region in northwestern France. On 1 January 2016, it was merged into the new commune of Balleroy-sur-Drôme.

== See also ==
- Communes of the Calvados department
