= Saint-Aubin-sur-Mer, Calvados =

Saint-Aubin-sur-Mer
- Commune
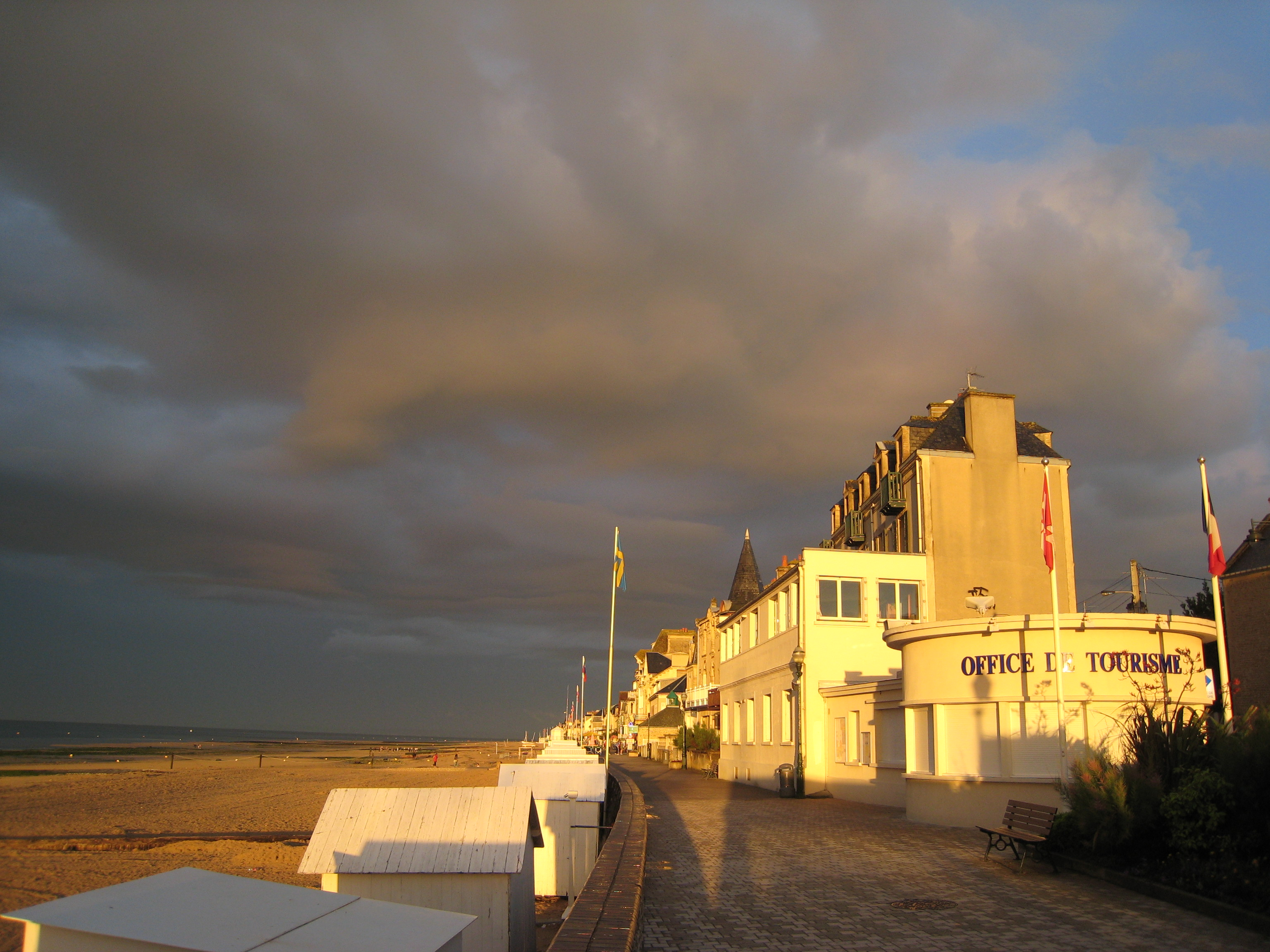
- The seafront at Saint-Aubin-sur-Mer

- Coat of arms
- Location of Saint-Aubin-sur-Mer
- Location within France Location within Normandy
- Coordinates: 49°19′45″N 0°23′19″W
- Country: France
- Region: Normandy
- Department: Calvados
- Arrondissement: Caen
- Canton: Courseulles-sur-Mer
- Intercommunality: CC Cœur de Nacre

Government
  - Mayor (2020–2026): Alexandre Berty
- Area^{1}: 3.03 km^{2} (1.17 sq mi)
- Elevation: 10 m (33 ft)
- Highest elevation: 30 m (98 ft)
- Lowest elevation: 2 m (6.6 ft)
- Population (2023): 2,101
  - Density: 693/km^{2} (1,800/sq mi)
- Time zone: UTC+01:00 (CET)
  - Summer (DST): UTC+02:00 (CEST)
- INSEE/Postal code: 14562 /14750
- ^{1} French Land Register data, which excludes lakes, ponds, glaciers > 1 km^{2} (0.386 sq mi or 247 acres) and river estuaries.

Saint Aubin-sur-Mer (French pronunciation: [sɛ̃.t‿obɛ̃ syʁ mɛʁ], literally Saint Aubin on Sea) is a commune in the Calvados department, in northwestern France. Administratively, it is part of the arrondissement of Caen and the canton of Courseulles-sur-Mer. It is 2.1 km east of Bernières-sur-Mer, 4 km north of Douvres-la-Délivrande and 16 km north of Caen.

== History ==
=== Origins ===
Up until July 1851, Saint-Aubin-sur-Mer was part of the commune of Langrune-sur-Mer. Upon its creation in 1851, by the will of Napoleon III , Saint-Aubin had a population of 1,153 and Langrune 1,129. Nicknamed "Queen of Iodine", at low tide its banks of seaside rocks expose, an air of iodine saturates the beaches, thanks to the bladder-fucus and kelp deposited there.

During the second half of the 19th century, the population of Saint-Aubin declined to the point that in 1901, there were only 727 inhabitants. In July 1876, a train station was opened in Saint-Aubin along the Caen à la mer line, permitting the development of a sea resort. The 1920s brought the construction of its Rococo or Art Deco villas, and its 1800 m seawall (dam walk), today the seafront buildings open passages to the narrow alleys, where old fishermen's houses are the watchful guardians of the past. Located in the heart of the Canadian and British D-Day beaches, the waterfront, to a large extent, did not suffer from the misdeeds of the war.

=== D-Day ===
At the beginning of the Battle of Normandy, the 3rd Canadian Infantry Division, commanded by Major General Rodney Keller, landed 15,000 Canadians and 9,000 British troops on the Calvados coast. Saint-Aubin-sur-Mer, one of five Canadian landing sites. was located at the eastern end of Canada's assigned landing sector of Juno Beach. On D-Day, the 8th Canadian Infantry (Assault) Brigade (Group) stormed the beach, landing The North Shore (New Brunswick) Regiment, the 10th Armoured Regiment (The Fort Garry Horse), and the guns of the 19th Canadian (Army) Field Regiment, RCA. The Canadians were met by about 100 defenders who garrisoned the town's fortified 'Resistance Nest'. The Germans were largely unaffected by the preparatory barrage, as such they were able to put up heavy resistance at the beach and in the town, for most of the day, as the Canadians pushed inland.

Widerstandnesten WN27, (Note: located at: North 49.332846 degrees and West 00.395439 degrees and in June 1944 for targeting purposes was at: LCC MR Grid 014850 (Ref. GSGS 4250 1:50K: Creully Sheet 7E/5)) the "Resistance Nest" at Saint-Aubin-sur-Mer was a platoon sized position, incorporating reinforced concrete (Verstärkt Feltmessig: Vf Type 2) gun casemates, with additional observation and fighting positions, located to dominate exits off the beach, into the town. A tight and compact position on the western side of town, the fight to hold WN27 was commanded by Züg Führer (Acting Commander) Lieutenant Gustav Pflochsch - Kompanie 5. / Grenadier-Regiment 736./ Bataillon II. The crew-served weapon shelters were linked by both underground passages and a well-developed system of trenches. WN 27 additionally incorporated a battalion heavy mortar detachment, located directly behind the beach seawall. Several of the villas and houses, in the town, had been strengthened and fortified as additional fighting positions, and to locate site snipers. Approaches into the position were well protected by K.V. Gruppe Courseulles minefields. (Note: The left front (NW) sea approach was protected by a large Beach Minefield: Mf 56, and beach front, above the left seawall, by Mf 44. The left rear (SW) land approach was protected Beach Minefield: Mf 55 and its rear left flank by tactical minefield: Mf 45.)

The coastline at St Aubin-dur-Mer was low lying, and to its east were low cliffs for a mile and a half, with a sea wall along most of it. Offshore, eastwards were rocky outcrops parts of which were exposed at low tide: les Essarts de Langrune. Having survived a weakened beach bombardment programme, at 07h39, WN 27 began to take indirect fire from 105 mm self-propelled guns on LCT landing craft. Firing on the run in, 19th Canadian (Army) Field Regiment, RCA, forty-eight guns fired for 30 minutes, putting down a very effective concentration, landing its first battery at 09h10. Heavily mortared getting off the narrowed (tide) and congested beach, the first gun was in action at 09h20. Observation and reconnaissance parties reported finding few targets in the early stages, when there was much close fighting, in the town. With no relief, the position was then covered by fire from LCT (Rocket) at H -8 minutes and H -5 minutes and the two flanks enveloped by Hedgerow mortar barrage, from LCA(HR)s at H -3 minutes, intended to cut the wire entanglements and detonate the landmines, securing the approaches onto the crew fighting positions. Disrupting any attempt at recovery, WN 27 began to take direct fire from the DD tanks of C Squadron, 10th Canadian Armoured Regiment, The Fort Garry Horse, arriving by LCT at H-Hour (07h55 BST). ‘C’ Squadron landed and managed to give supporting fire from the beach.

Attacked from its left flank, WN 27 was assaulted by ‘B’ Company, The North Shore (New Brunswick) Regiment (OC Major R.B. Forbes) they landing just west of the town, at 08h10, it having the difficult task of clearing the strong-point. This as ‘A’ Company, (Major J.A.M.C. Naughton), landing at 08h10 hours, to its right, was to clear the beach-houses fronting the seawall. At H+45 with no beach exits, the reserve North Shore companies landing, Major Bray commanding C squadron of the Fort Garry Horse decided to advance through the minefield losing three tanks, but with Churchill AVREs, after a hard fight St Aubin was soon under control. 'A' Company was clear of its planned objective by 09h48. Except for the strong-point, Saint Aubin was reported as "neutralized (secure)" at 11h15 and "Neutralized (Cleared)" – at 18h00. The North Shores landing at Nan Red lost nearly 50 men (dead and wounded) in the fight for WN 27.

German Crew Served Weapons at WN 27 Saint-Aubin-sur-Mer.
Regelbau type	Ringstand (casement)	Weapon	Notes
OB Gr.West Vf600v	KWK SK Small Hood (Haube)	5 cm Pak 38 L/60 anti-tank gun	180 Degree open pedestal
OB Gr.W Heer VfRs58c	Tobrouk - 80 cm thick	Heavy machine gun and crew	Reinforced field position
OB Gr.W Type 34 Vf69	Tobrouk sGranatwerfer	8 cm Granatwerfer 34 8.14 cm Heavy Mortar	For crew and observer
Weapon Crew Posts x3	Reinforced Vf (Verstärkt Feldmäßig)	Light machine gun	Open Crew Fighting Posts x3
Mortar Crew Winged Pit	Nest fur schweren Granatenwerfer 34	3 x 8.14 cm Battalion mortar	Gruppen Beyond Seawall - Left Flank

Discussing the fire support to the landing at Saint Aubin-sur-Mer (NAN Red), a debate began, in late June 1944, as to who was not entirely effective in supporting the North Shores and the Fort Garry’s, on 6 June.

- ‘On the left battalion front (St. Aubin-sur-Mer) neither the RAF heavy bombers, the rockets, nor the self-propelled artillery actually covered the main strong point and the North Shore Regiment engaged it without the assistance of heavier arms until sometime later. A considerable time was therefore spent in reducing it.’ Brigadier K.C. Blackader, MC, ED, Commander 8th Canadian Infantry Brigade:24 June 1944.
- From H-40 to H, the three Fleet ‘V’ Class Destroyers, of Assault Group J2, HMS Vigilant (R93), HMCS Algonquin (R17) and HMCS Sioux did not fire, as planned in support of the two 8 CIB landings. Controlled by HMS Kempenfelt (Flag - Captain Assault Group J2), The Beach Drenching Fire Programme, set out to ensure indirect naval gunfire was delivered to the right beach, at the right time, was changed, as the St Aubin and Bernières landings took place.
- When 8th Canadian Infantry Brigade put H Hour back by ten minutes, this apparently caused a delay in the opening of fire of the SP artillery, as six batteries had to adjust their firing tables. However, Brigade HQ reported that Bernières and St Aubin received ‘a terrific pounding’, this before all SP artillery fire switched to St Aubin. At the time, the cause was thought to be the strong current making navigation and station keeping difficult, as SP guns had a limited traverse, the LCT itself had to be aimed, the current caused all craft to point at St Aubin. A later report suggested a technical problem with the control craft observing and controlling fire on Bernières, so control was transferred to the craft off St Aubin and all fire concentrated there. Whatever the cause it was Bernières (Nan White), that did not receive the full (beach) barrage as planned.

== Population ==
Historical population

Year	Pop.	±% p.a.
1851	1,153	—
1856	1,136	−0.30%
1861	1,092	−0.79%
1866	1,051	−0.76%
1872	949	−1.69%
1876	913	−0.96%
1881	873	−0.89%
1886	867	−0.14%
1891	847	−0.47%
1896	736	−2.77%
1901	727	−0.25%
1906	768	+1.10%
1911	790	+0.57%
1921	784	−0.08%
1926	977	+4.50%

Year	Pop.	±% p.a.
1931	1,017	+0.81%
1936	1,010	−0.14%
1946	1,669	+5.15%
1954	1,231	−3.73%
1962	1,006	−2.49%
1968	1,053	+0.76%
1975	1,189	+1.75%
1982	1,446	+2.83%
1990	1,526	+0.68%
1999	1,810	+1.91%
2007	1,836	+0.18%
2012	2,190	+3.59%
2017	2,387	+1.74%
2023	2,101	−2.10%

Source: EHESS and INSEE (1968-2023)

== Literary associations ==
- Saint-Aubin-sur-Mer is the setting of Robert Browning's poem Red Cotton Night-Cap Country, where it is renamed Saint-Rambert.
- In this picturesque seaside town Émile Zola wrote his novel about the underbelly of Paris society, L'Assommoir. It turned him into a literary star. More here plus pics.

== Activities ==
- Every summer in the middle of August, Saint-Aubin hosts a week-long festival called La semaine acadienne, composed of concerts by musical groups from Acadia, a Tintamarre, an open-air ball, exhibitions, documentary film showings, etc. The festival also pays tribute to the Acadian soldiers of the North Shore Regiment of New Brunswick who landed on the beach of Saint-Aubin on June 6, 1944.

== International relations ==
The commune is twinned with:

- Bathurst, New Brunswick, Canada - many soldiers that died in Saint-Aubin were from there
- Emsworth in Hampshire, England

== See also ==
- Communes of the Calvados department
