= Basly =

- Commune
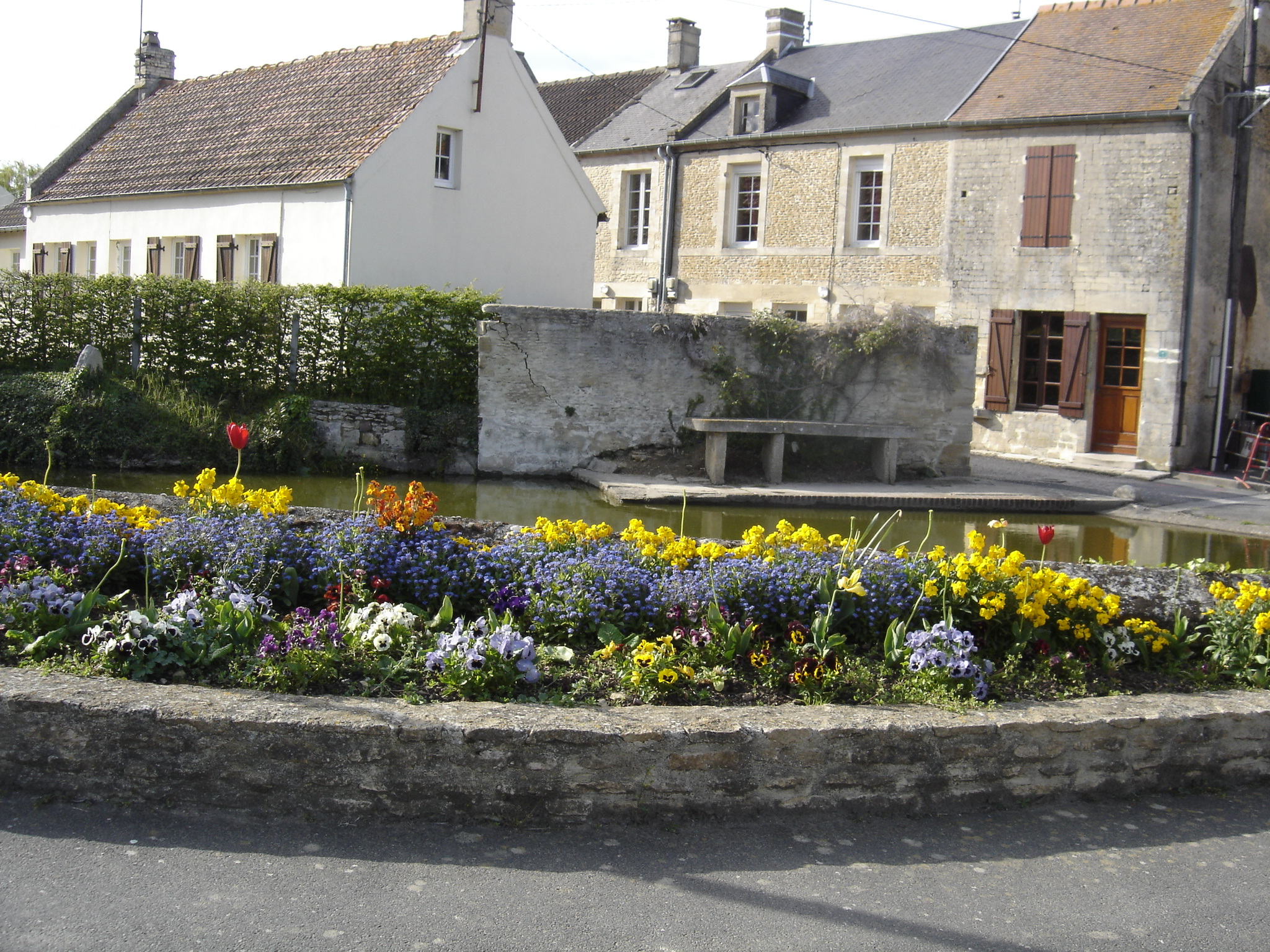
- The old Lavoir at Basly
- Location of Basly
- Location within France Location within Normandy
- Coordinates: 49°16′48″N 0°25′19″W
- Country: France
- Region: Normandy
- Department: Calvados
- Arrondissement: Caen
- Canton: Courseulles-sur-Mer
- Intercommunality: CC Cœur de Nacre

Government
  - Mayor (2020–2026): Yves Gauquelain
- Area^{1}: 3.92 km^{2} (1.51 sq mi)
- Elevation: 70 m (230 ft)
- Highest elevation: 62 m (203 ft)
- Lowest elevation: 18 m (59 ft)
- Population (2023): 1,029
  - Density: 263/km^{2} (680/sq mi)
- Time zone: UTC+01:00 (CET)
  - Summer (DST): UTC+02:00 (CEST)
- INSEE/Postal code: 14044 /14610
- ^{1} French Land Register data, which excludes lakes, ponds, glaciers > 1 km^{2} (0.386 sq mi or 247 acres) and river estuaries.

Basly (French pronunciation: [bali]) is a commune in the Calvados department in the Normandy region of north-western France.

The inhabitants of the commune are known as Basliens or Basliennes.

== Geography ==
Basly is located some 6 km south-east of Courseulles-sur-Mer and 10 km north-west of Caen. Access to the commune is by the D79 road from Bény-sur-Mer in the north-east which passes through the village and continues south-east to Colomby-sur-Thaon. The D83 comes from Douvres-la-Délivrande in the north-east through the village then south-west to Thaon. The D404 passes through the north-east corner of the commune and the D141 from Fontaine-Henry to Colomby-sur-Thaon passes through the south-west corner. The commune is entirely farmland.

The Mue river forms the border of the south-western corner of the commune as it twists around then flows north-west to join the Seulles at Reviers.

== History ==
At a place called Campagne in the commune (near the Moto-Club) many archaeological remains have been found. This is on a spur blocked by the valley of the Mue. The most famous remains are those of a habitat from the first Iron Age (the Hallstatt culture) with an associated rectangular necropolis. There is archaeological evidence of a Neolithic stockade in medieval times.

Basly appears as Basly on the 1750 Cassini Map and the same on the 1790 version.

== Administration ==
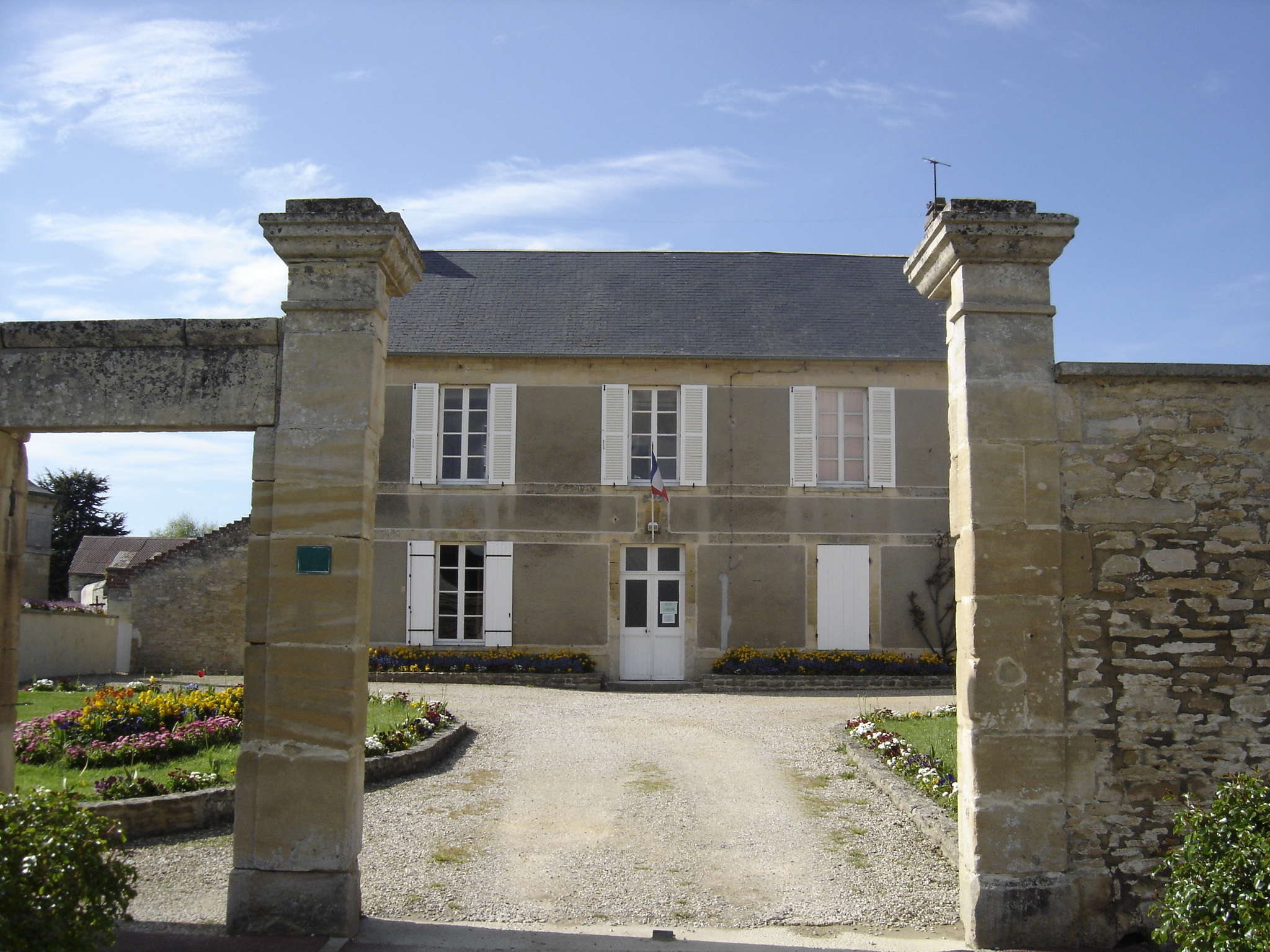
Basly Town Hall

List of Successive Mayors

From	To	Name	Party	Position
1800	1844	Louis		
1860	1879	Paisant		
1879	1891	Viel		
1894	1896	Maillard		
1894	1896	Viel		
1896	1903	Legras		
1903	1904	Marie		
1942	1953	Leboucher		
1953	1959	Marie		
1959	1965	Leboucher		
1965	1971	Marie		
1971	1979	Vauvert		
1979	1983	Coutard		
1983	1989	Lemarchand		
1989	2008	François Oudin		
2008	2026	Yves Gauquelain		Retired

The Municipal Council is composed of 15 members including the Mayor and 4 deputies.

== Demography ==
Historical population

Year	Pop.	±% p.a.
1793	511	—
1821	518	+0.05%
1846	427	−0.77%
1872	370	−0.55%
1901	263	−1.17%
1921	217	−0.96%
1936	213	−0.12%
1946	241	+1.24%
1954	258	+0.86%
1962	237	−1.06%

Year	Pop.	±% p.a.
1968	272	+2.32%
1975	383	+5.01%
1982	672	+8.36%
1990	633	−0.74%
1999	657	+0.41%
2007	910	+4.16%
2012	1,137	+4.55%
2017	1,105	−0.57%
2023	1,029	−1.18%

Source: EHESS and INSEE

== Culture and heritage ==
=== Religious heritage ===
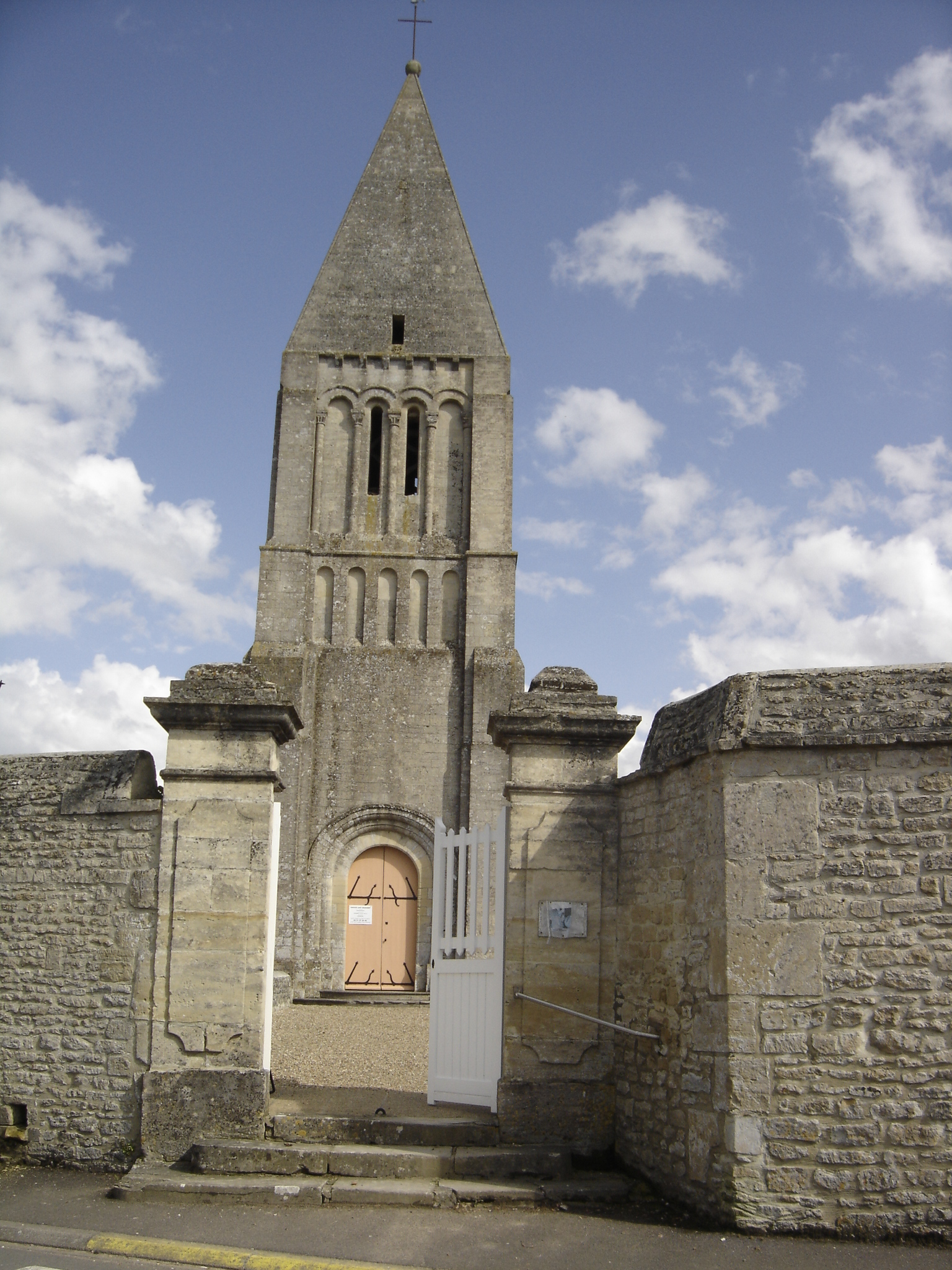
The Church bell tower

The Church of Saint Georges Bell Tower (12th century) is registered as an historical monument.

== Festivals and events ==
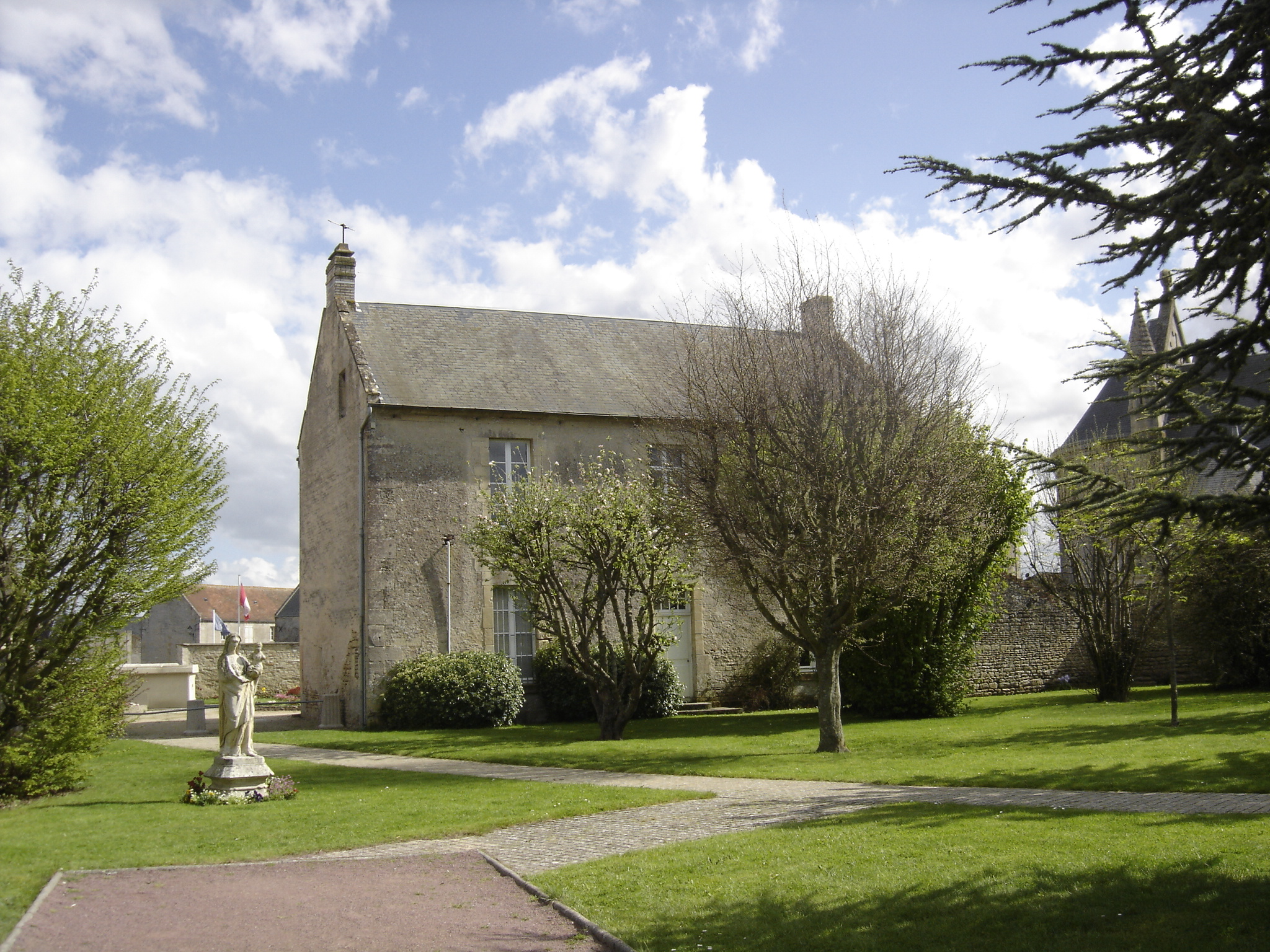
The Town Hall garden

=== Sports ===
- The Football Club of Basly has two soccer teams in district divisions.
- The 'Moto Club was created in 1977 and has a motocross circuit and a driving school.

== Notable people linked to the commune ==
- Déodat de Basly (1862 at Basly - 1937), religious and Franciscan theologian.

== See also ==
- Communes of the Calvados department
