= Anguerny =

Commune in Normandy, France

- Part of Colomby-Anguerny
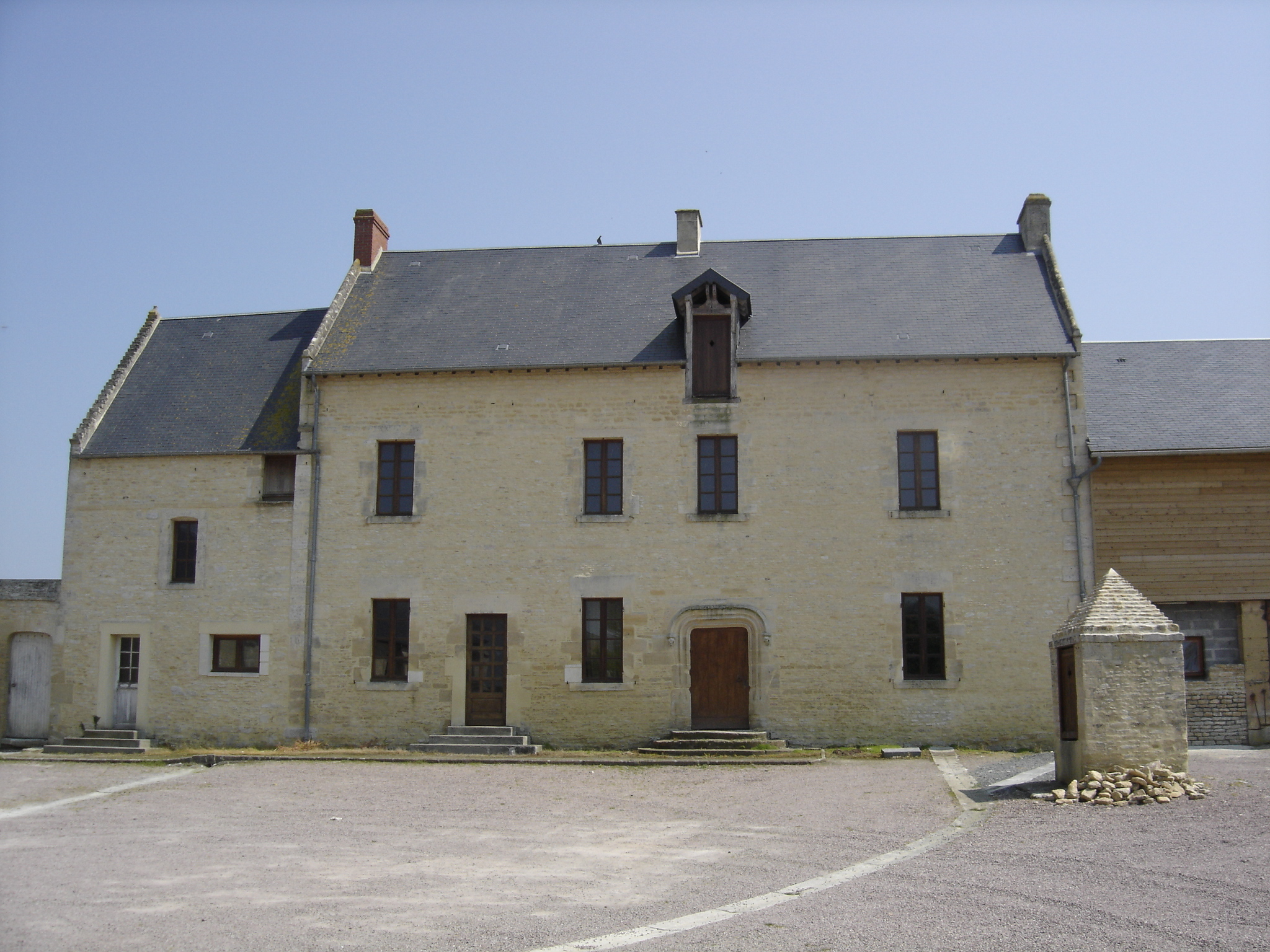
- Old House at Anguerny

- Coat of arms
- Location of Anguerny
- Location within France Location within Normandy
- Coordinates: 49°16′39″N 0°23′49″W
- Country: France
- Region: Normandy
- Department: Calvados
- Arrondissement: Caen
- Canton: Courseulles-sur-Mer
- Commune: Colomby-Anguerny
- Area^{1}: 2.85 km^{2} (1.10 sq mi)
- Elevation: 49 m (161 ft)
- Highest elevation: 69 m (226 ft)
- Lowest elevation: 44 m (144 ft)
- Population (2013): 754
  - Density: 265/km^{2} (685/sq mi)
- Time zone: UTC+01:00 (CET)
  - Summer (DST): UTC+02:00 (CEST)
- Postal code: 14610
- ^{1} French Land Register data, which excludes lakes, ponds, glaciers > 1 km^{2} (0.386 sq mi or 247 acres) and river estuaries.

Anguerny (French pronunciation: [ɑ̃ɡɛʁni]) is a former commune in the Calvados department in the Normandy region of northwestern France. On 1 January 2016, it was merged into the new commune of Colomby-Anguerny.

== Geography ==
Anguerny is located 10 kilometres north-west of Caen and 3 kilometres south of Douvres-la-Delivrande. The D79 from Caen passes through the west of the commune and continues to Basly. The D7 from Caen to Douvres-la-Delivrande passes just to the east of the commune. Access to the commune is by the D141 which links the D79 to the D7 passing through the village and the commune. Apart from the village the commune is entirely farmland.

== History ==
The commune was called successively Aguerne then Aguerny before taking its current name. The parish was under the authority of the Lords of Creully.

=== Heraldry ===
Arms of Anguerny	Blazon: Or, a chevron of Gules couped and écimé with a sword Azure in fess, the guard enhanced to dexter and the point abased to sinister debruised by the dexter branch of the chevron.

== Administration ==
List of Successive Mayors

From	To	Name	Party
1989	2001	Paul Rivoalen	
2001	2014	Alain Yaouanc	SE
2014	2016	Jean-Luc Guillouard	

=== Twinning ===
Anguerny has twinning associations with:

- East Woodhay (United Kingdom) since 1997.

== Demography ==
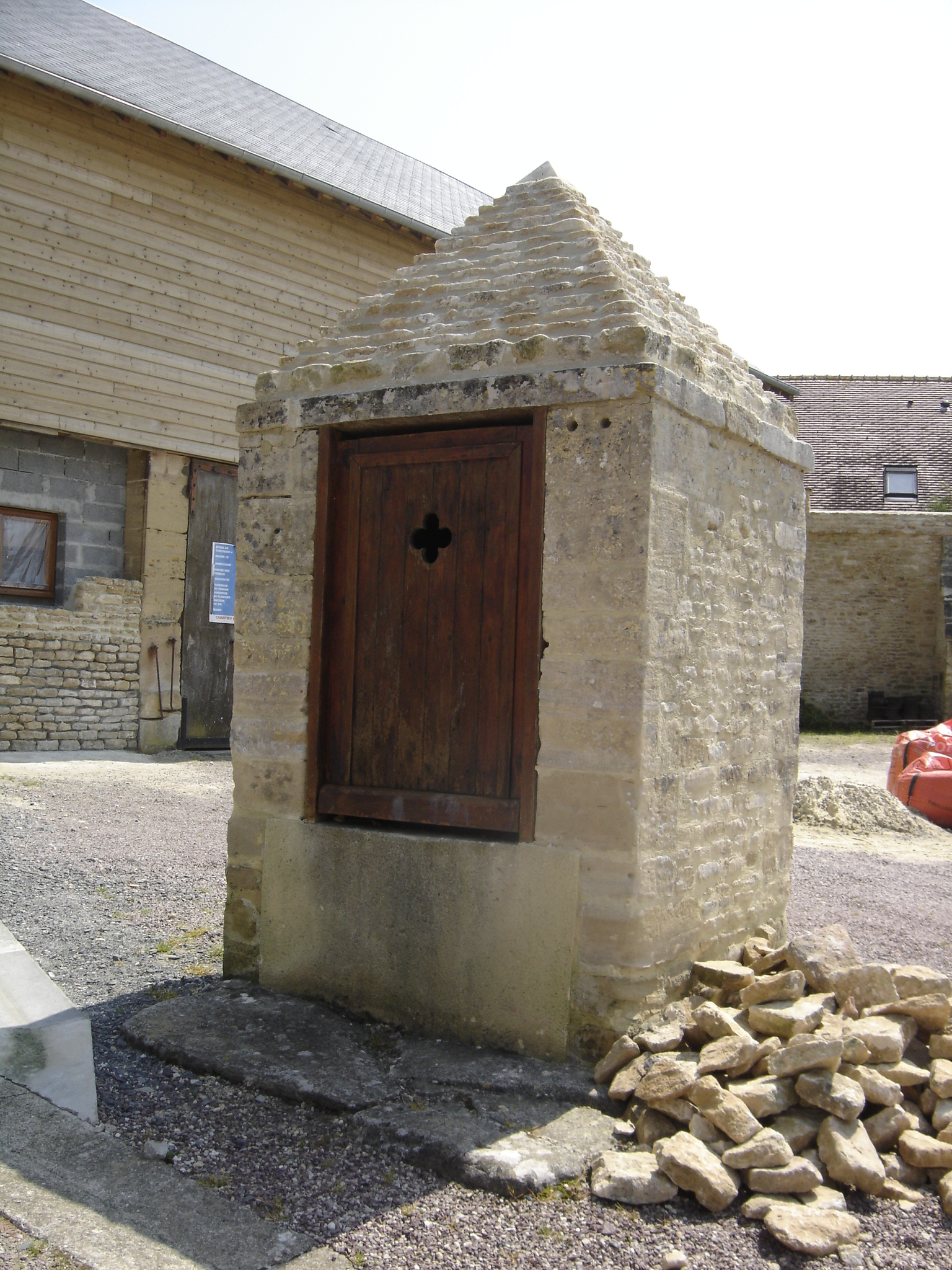
Covered Well at Anguerny

The inhabitants of the commune are known as Agernynois or Agernynoises in French.

Historical population

Year	Pop.	±% p.a.
1793	417	—
1800	453	+1.19%
1806	536	+2.84%
1821	540	+0.05%
1831	568	+0.51%
1836	529	−1.41%
1841	502	−1.04%
1846	520	+0.71%
1851	518	−0.08%
1856	509	−0.35%
1861	516	+0.27%
1866	472	−1.77%
1872	412	−2.24%
1876	359	−3.38%
1881	311	−2.83%
1886	314	+0.19%
1891	304	−0.65%
1896	276	−1.91%

Year	Pop.	±% p.a.
1901	243	−2.51%
1906	230	−1.09%
1911	204	−2.37%
1921	205	+0.05%
1926	213	+0.77%
1931	238	+2.24%
1936	212	−2.29%
1946	256	+1.90%
1954	287	+1.44%
1962	260	−1.23%
1968	269	+0.57%
1975	306	+1.86%
1982	380	+3.14%
1990	390	+0.33%
1999	724	+7.12%
2007	812	+1.44%
2012	756	−1.42%

Source: EHESS and INSEE

== Sites and monuments ==
- The Church of Saint Martin Bell Tower (11th century) is classified as an historical monument. The church contains four items that are registered as historical objects:
  - A Tabernacle and Seating (19th century)
  - A Painting: Calvary (17th century)
  - A Retable (17th century)
  - The main Altar: The Crucifixion (1760)
- A Tithe barn
- 2 Festival halls

Saint Martin Church Picture Gallery

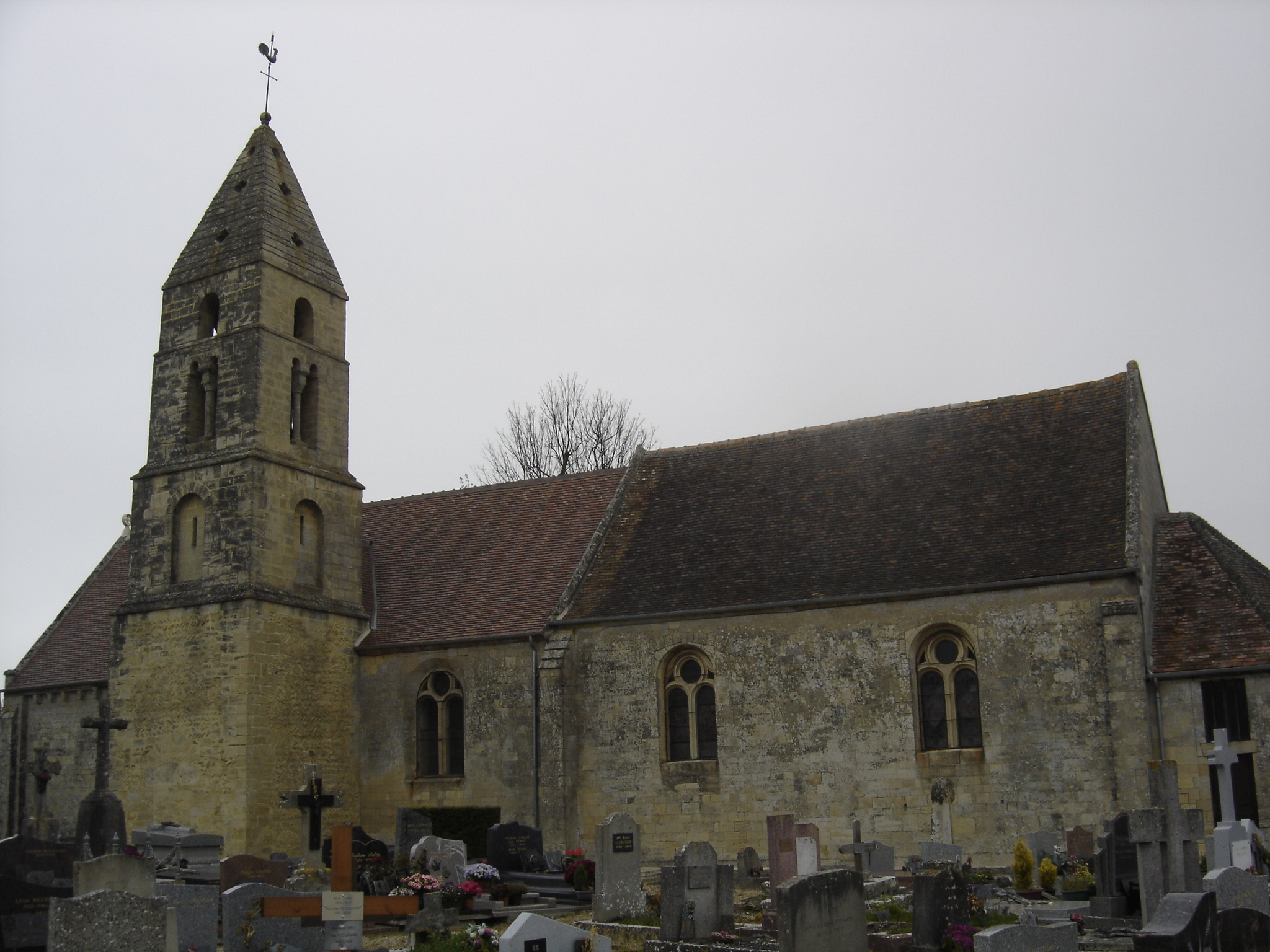
Church of Saint Martin

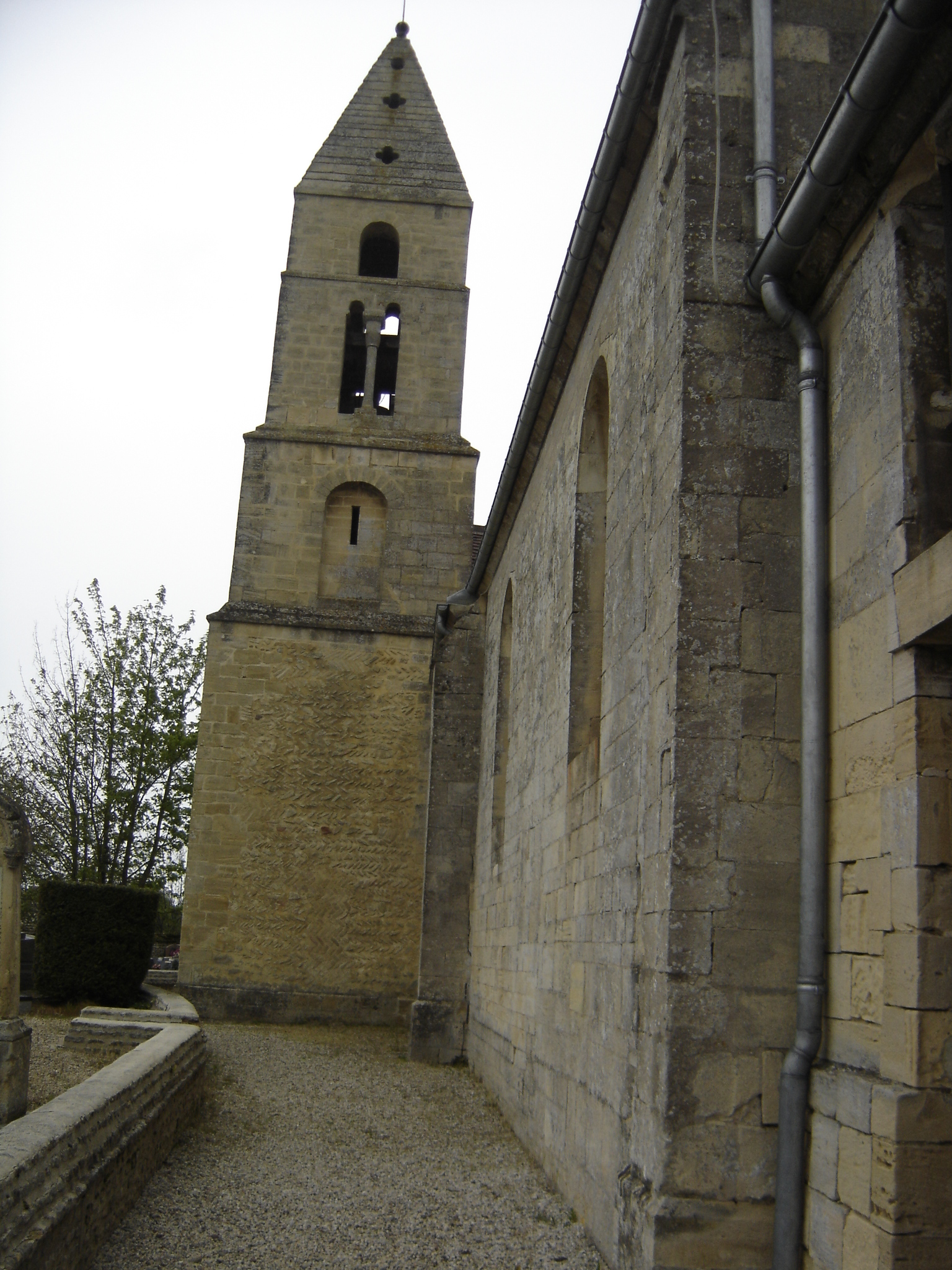
The Bell Tower

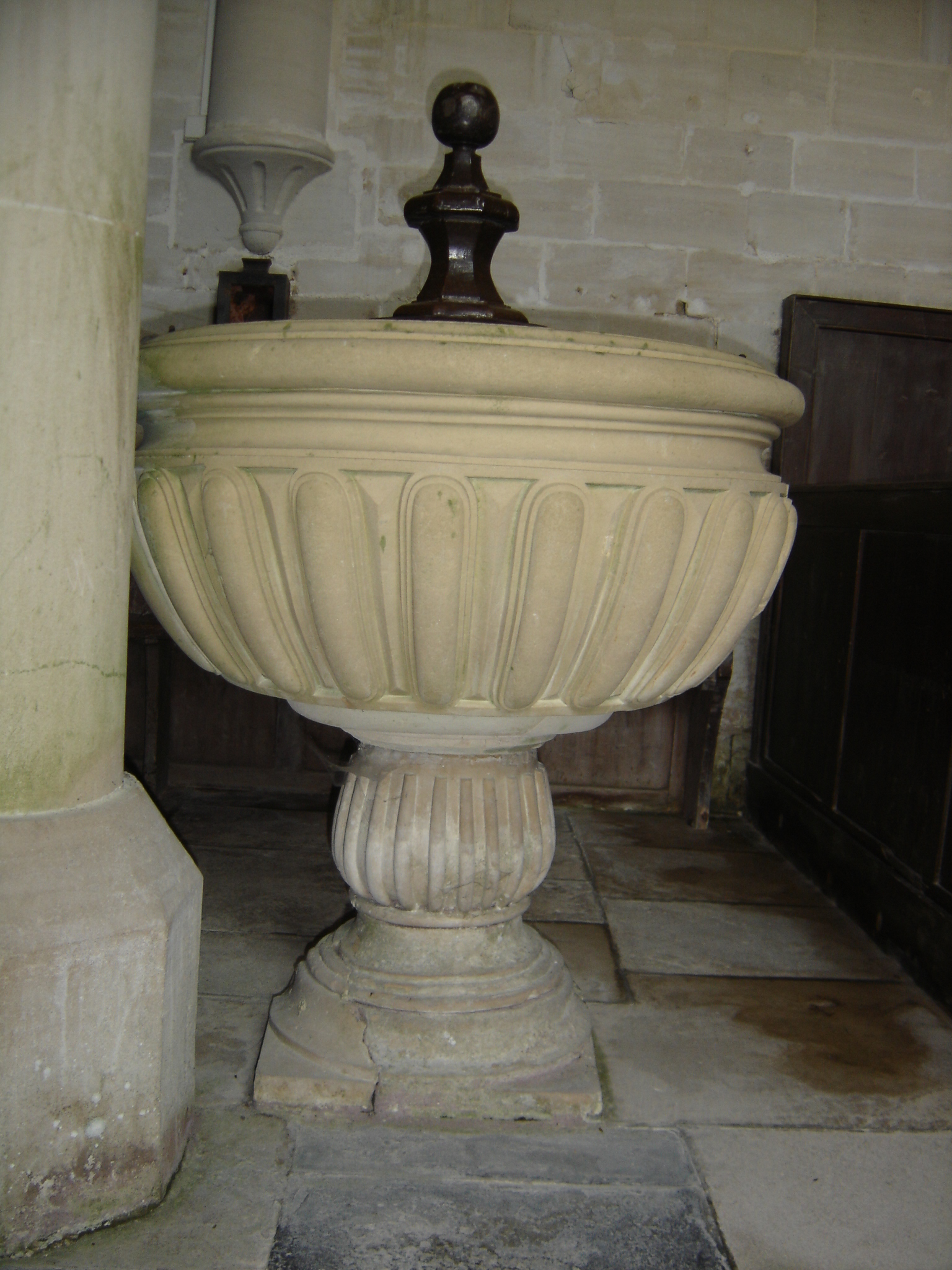
The Baptismal Font

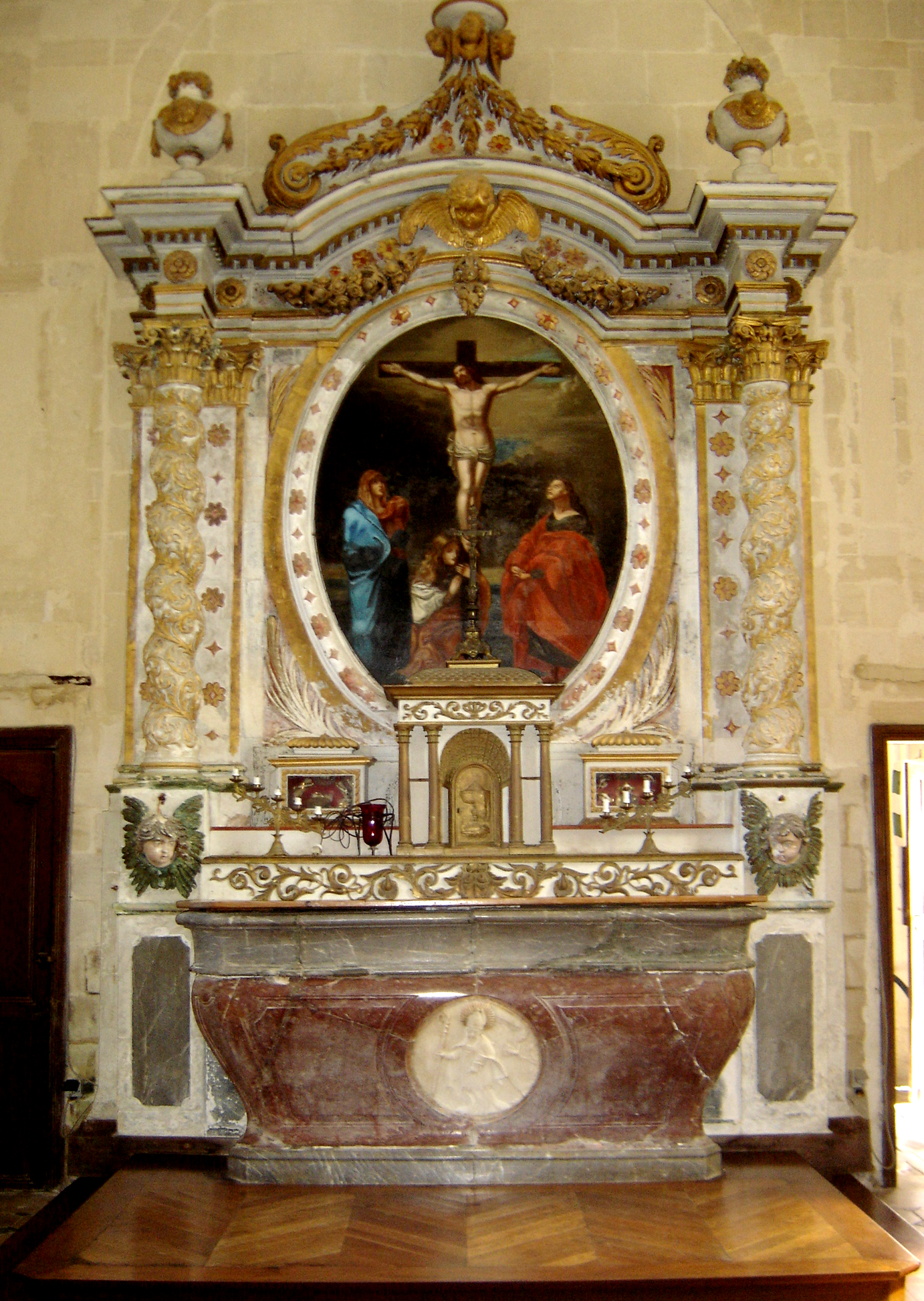
Altar and Retable

== Activities and events ==
The Romanes d'Anguerny is held every two years in spring.

== See also ==
- Communes of the Calvados department
