= Anisy =

- Commune
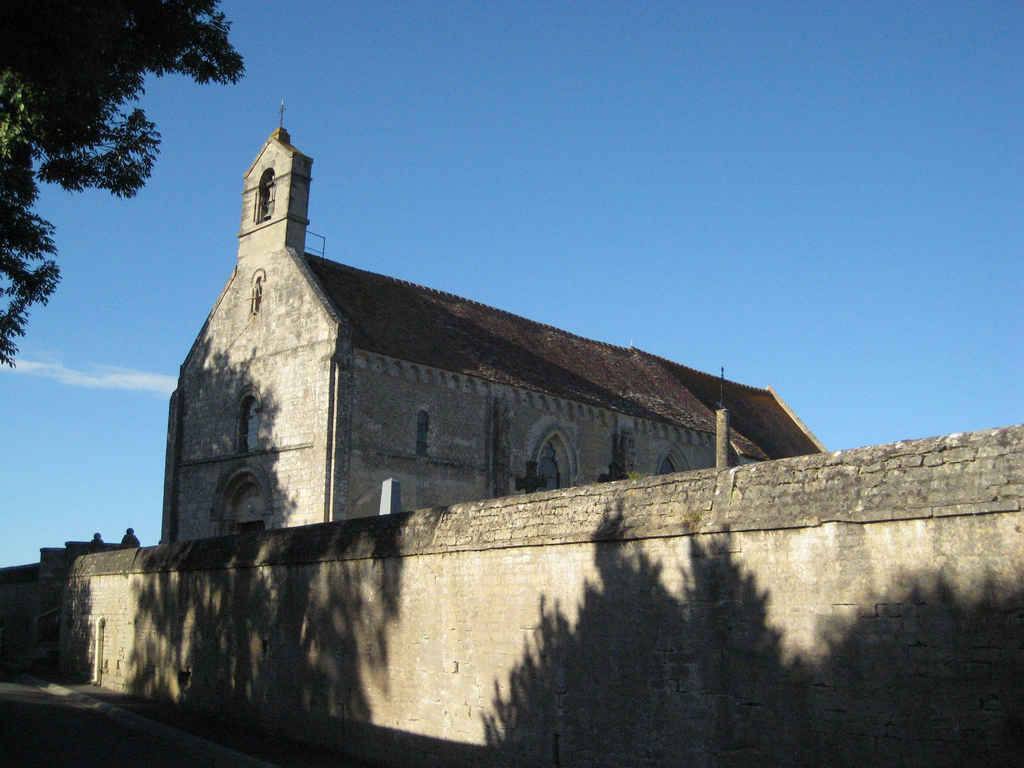
- Church of Saint Peter

- Coat of arms
- Location of Anisy
- Location within France Location within Normandy
- Coordinates: 49°15′07″N 0°23′27″W
- Country: France
- Region: Normandy
- Department: Calvados
- Arrondissement: Caen
- Canton: Courseulles-sur-Mer
- Intercommunality: Cœur de Nacre

Government
  - Mayor (2026–32): Pierre Paumier
- Area^{1}: 4.19 km^{2} (1.62 sq mi)
- Elevation: 50 m (160 ft)
- Highest elevation: 67 m (220 ft)
- Lowest elevation: 44 m (144 ft)
- Population (2023): 819
  - Density: 195/km^{2} (506/sq mi)
- Time zone: UTC+01:00 (CET)
  - Summer (DST): UTC+02:00 (CEST)
- INSEE/Postal code: 14015 /14610
- ^{1} French Land Register data, which excludes lakes, ponds, glaciers > 1 km^{2} (0.386 sq mi or 247 acres) and river estuaries.

Anisy (French pronunciation: [anizi]) is a commune in the Calvados department in the Normandy region of north-western France.

== Geography ==
Anisy is located some 8 km north by north-west of Caen and 4 km south of Douvres-la-Délivrande. It can be accessed by the D79 road from Caen passing through the west of the commune and continuing to Anguerny. The village can be accessed by the D220 road from Mathieu in the east passing through the village and the commune and continuing to Villons-les-Buissons in the south-west. The D220A branches off the D220 in the village and goes south to Cambes-en-Plaine. The D141 from Mathieu to Anguerny also passes through the north-eastern tip of the commune. Apart from the village the commune is entirely farmland.

== History ==
The commune was founded in the 11th century by the Anisy family.

Anisy was liberated by The Queen's Own Rifles of Canada on the first evening of the Normandy landings on 6 June 1944. The Rifles were the only Regiment to reach its assigned objective that day.

=== Heraldry ===
Arms of Anisy	Blazon: Argent, semy of billetty of Sable with a lion the same crowned in Or, tongued and armed in Gules debruised by all.

== Administration ==
List of Successive Mayors

From	To	Name	Party	Position
?	1995	Michel Leparquier		
1995	2001	Daniel Armand		Telecoms technician
2001	2014	Maurice Lambert	ind.	Retired Farmer
2014	2026	Nicolas Delahaye		
2026	2032	Pierre Paumier	ind.	

== Population ==
The inhabitants of the commune are known as Anisiens or Anisiennes in French.

Historical population
Year	Pop.	±% p.a.
1968	290	—
1975	318	+1.33%
1982	388	+2.88%
1990	520	+3.73%
1999	633	+2.21%
2007	665	+0.62%
2012	681	+0.48%
2017	730	+1.40%
2023	819	+1.94%
Source: INSEE

== Sites and monuments ==
- Church of Saint Peter (12th and 13th centuries), registered as a historical monument in 1927.
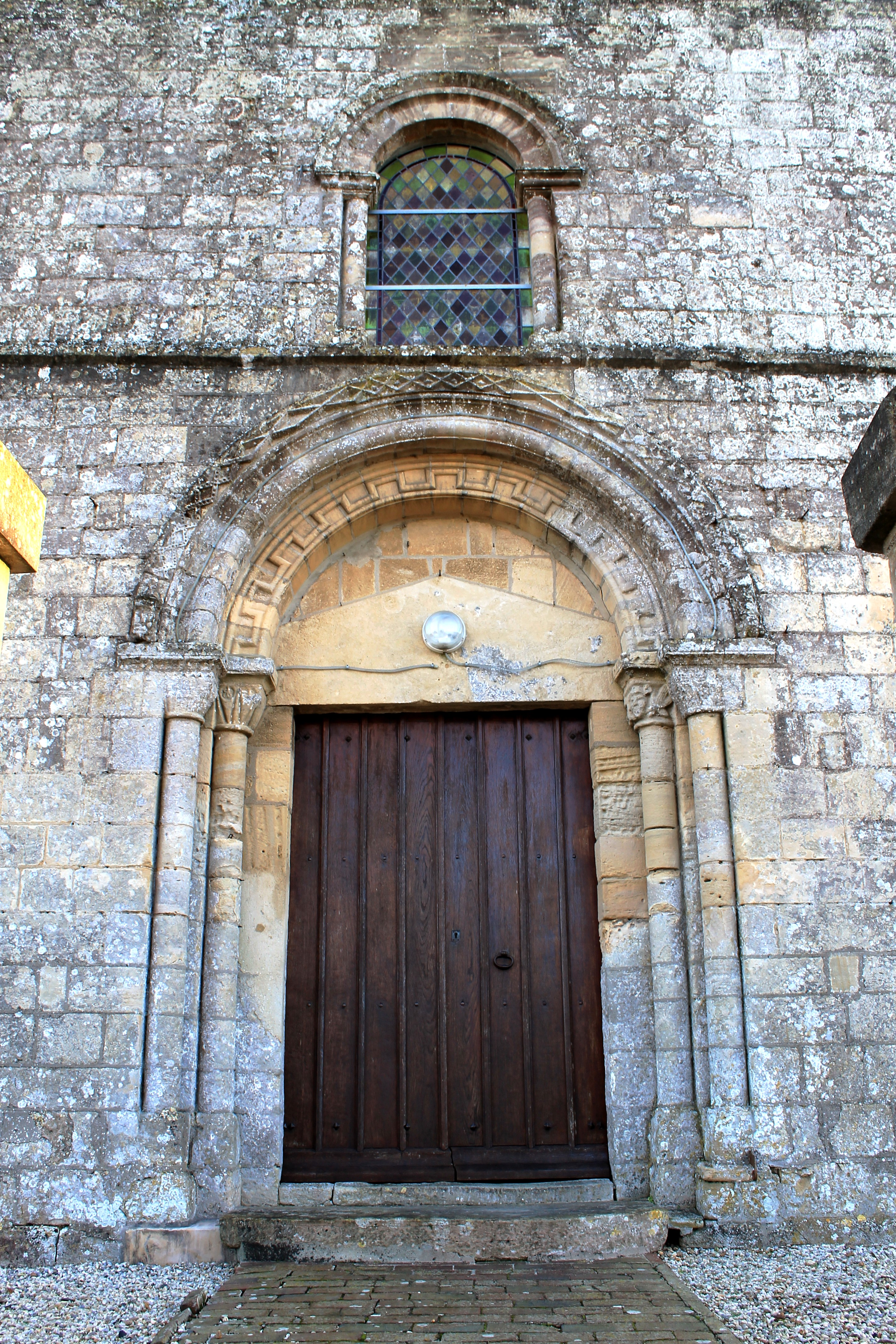
The entrance of the Church of Saint-Pierre.

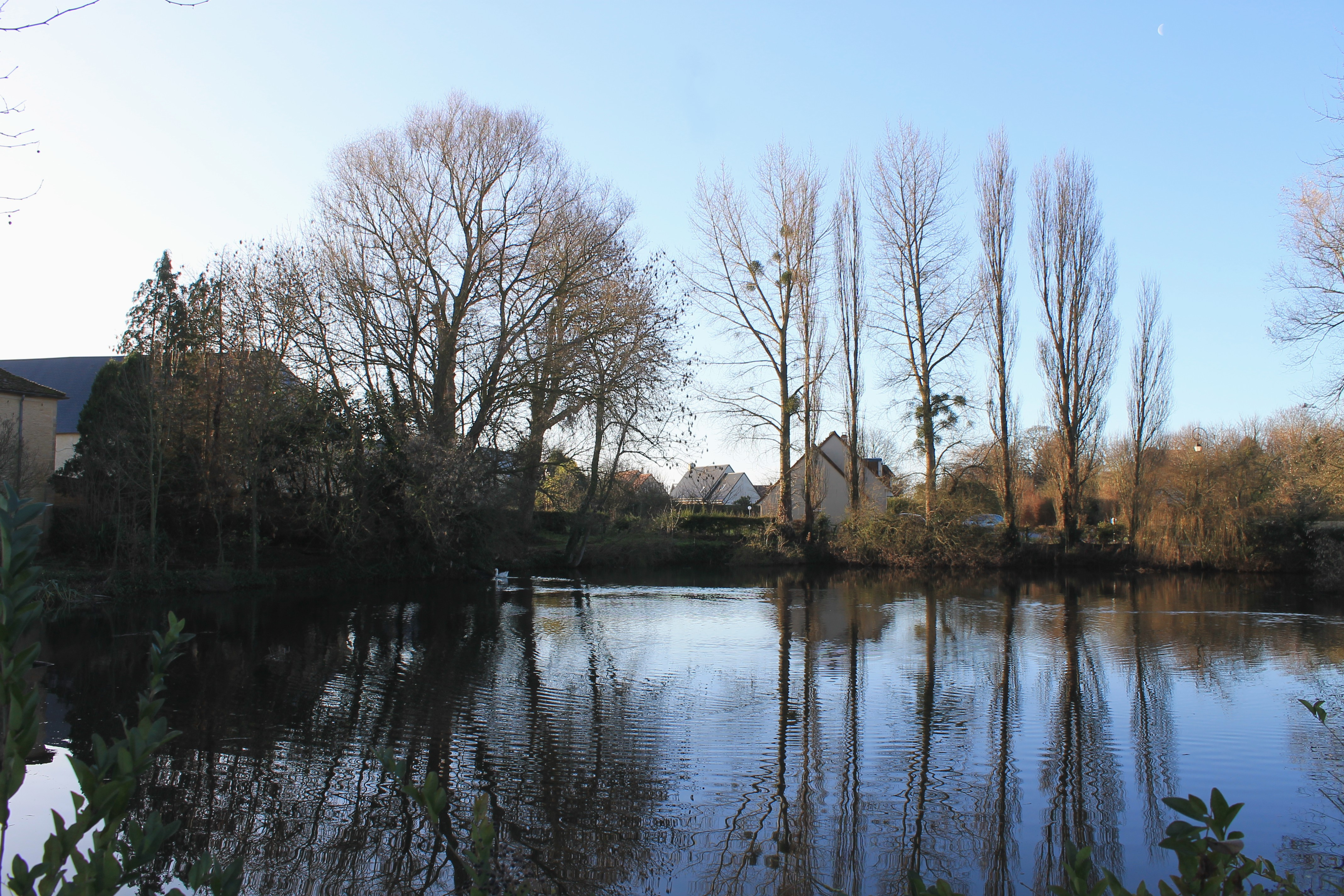
The source of the Dan river.

== Notable people linked to the commune ==
- Madeleine Barbulée, French actress, born on 2 September 1910 at Nancy, Meurthe-et-Moselle. She died on 1 January 2001 in Paris and was buried in the cemetery at Anisy.

== See also ==
- Communes of the Calvados department
