= Colomby-sur-Thaon =

- Part of Colomby-Anguerny
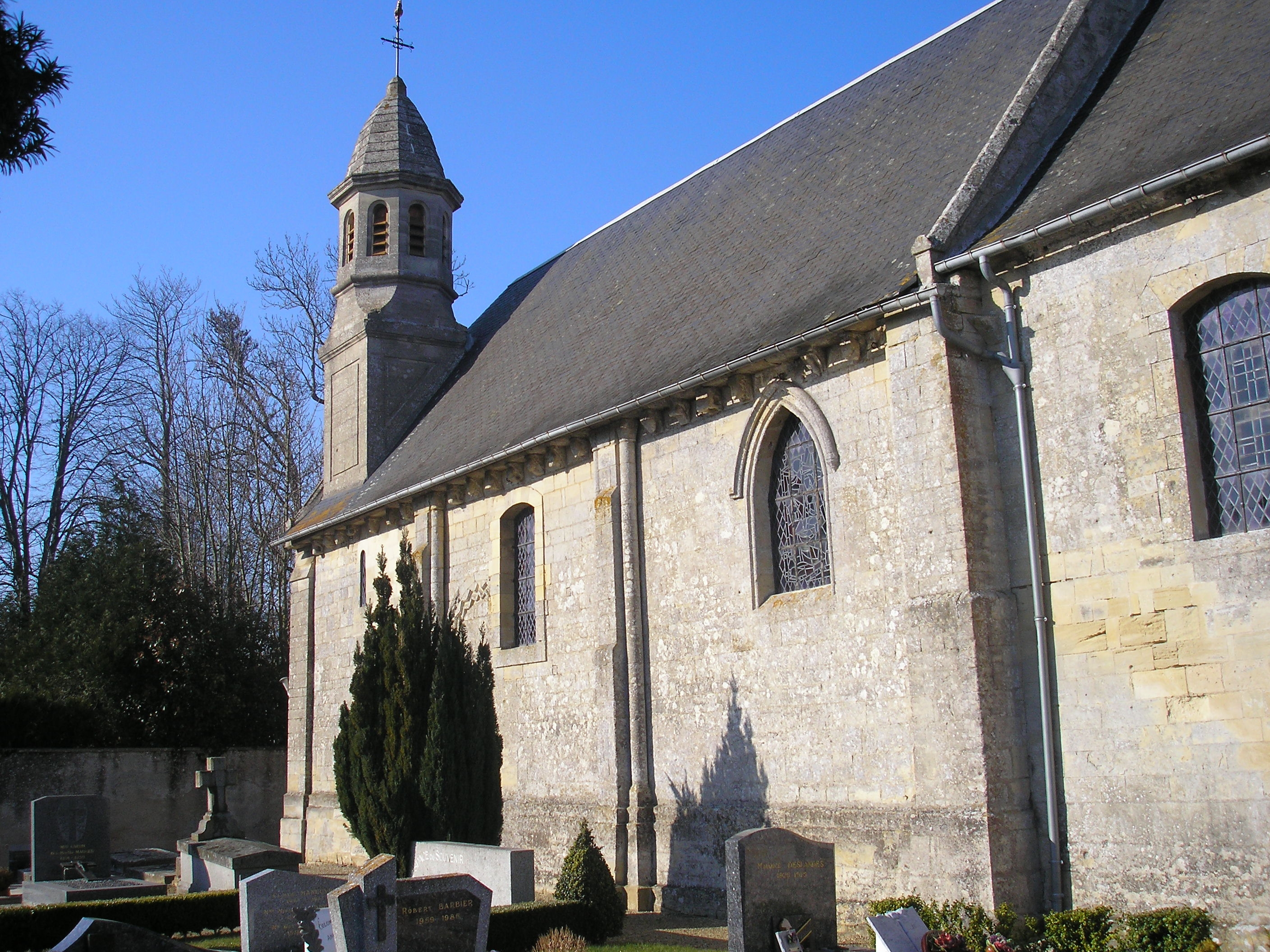
- Location of Colomby-sur-Thaon
- Location within France Location within Normandy
- Coordinates: 49°15′57″N 0°24′37″W
- Country: France
- Region: Normandy
- Department: Calvados
- Arrondissement: Caen
- Canton: Courseulles-sur-Mer
- Commune: Colomby-Anguerny
- Area^{1}: 2.76 km^{2} (1.07 sq mi)
- Elevation: 65 m (213 ft)
- Highest elevation: 68 m (223 ft)
- Lowest elevation: 19 m (62 ft)
- Population (2017): 382
  - Density: 138/km^{2} (358/sq mi)
- Time zone: UTC+01:00 (CET)
  - Summer (DST): UTC+02:00 (CEST)
- Postal code: 14610
- ^{1} French Land Register data, which excludes lakes, ponds, glaciers > 1 km^{2} (0.386 sq mi or 247 acres) and river estuaries.

Colomby-sur-Thaon (French pronunciation: [kɔlɔ̃bi syʁ tɑ̃], literally Colomby on Thaon) is a former commune in the Calvados department in the Normandy region in northwestern France. On 1 January 2016, it was merged into the new commune of Colomby-Anguerny.

== See also ==
- Colomby, Manche
- Communes of the Calvados department
