= Daniel Armand =

Daniel Armand may refer to:

- Daniel Armand (The 4400), fictional character
- Daniel Armand, mayor of Anisy
- Daniel Armand (footballer) for AS Béziers Hérault (football)

== See also ==
- Daniel Armand-Delille (1906–1957), French bobsledder
