= Crépon =

- Commune
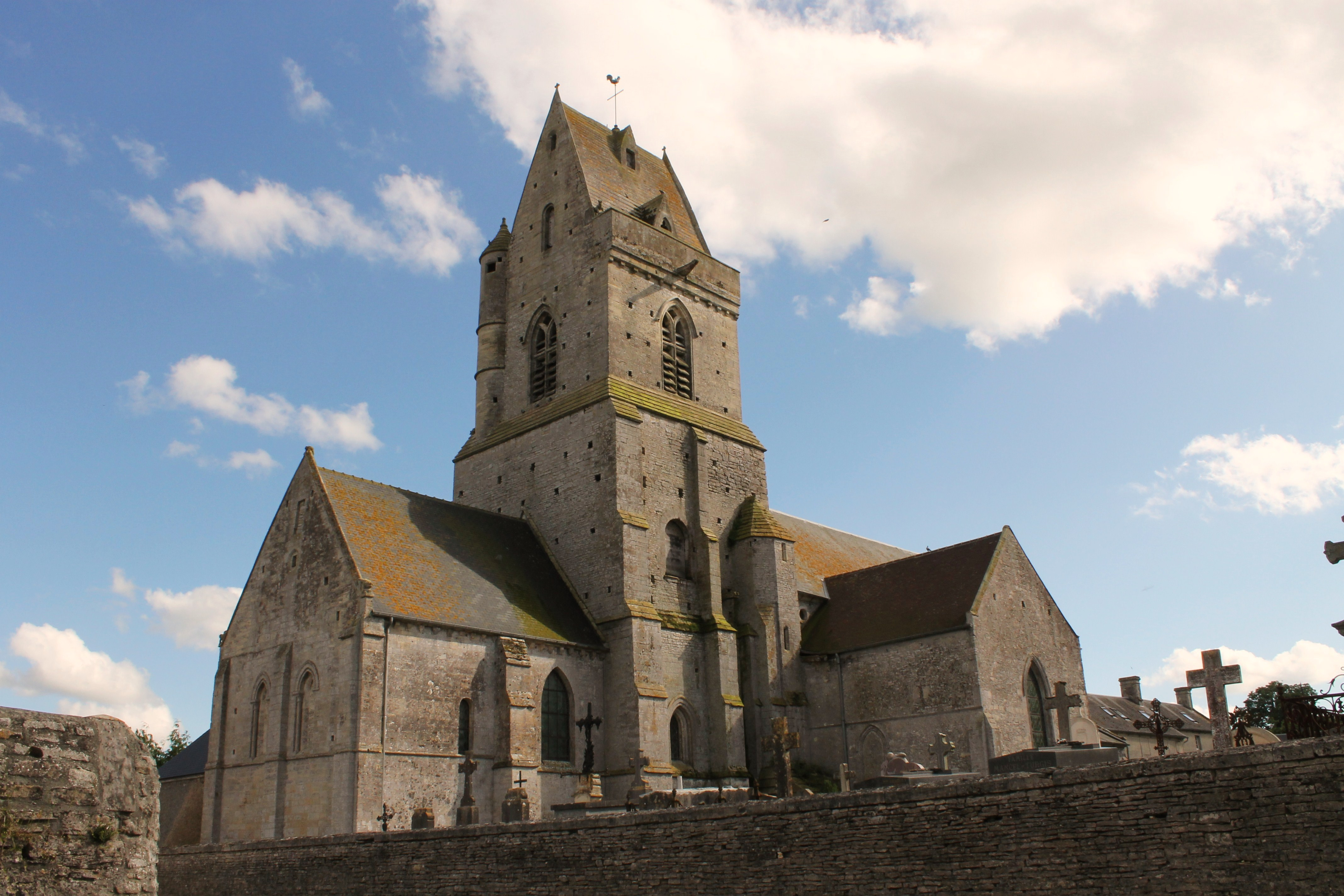
- The church in Crépon

- Coat of arms
- Location of Crépon
- Location within France Location within Normandy
- Coordinates: 49°19′01″N 0°32′57″W
- Country: France
- Region: Normandy
- Department: Calvados
- Arrondissement: Bayeux
- Canton: Courseulles-sur-Mer
- Intercommunality: CC Seulles Terre Mer

Government
  - Mayor (2020–2026): Pierre de Poncins
- Area^{1}: 5.42 km^{2} (2.09 sq mi)
- Elevation: 60 m (200 ft)
- Highest elevation: 61 m (200 ft)
- Lowest elevation: 39 m (128 ft)
- Population (2023): 222
  - Density: 41.0/km^{2} (106/sq mi)
- Time zone: UTC+01:00 (CET)
  - Summer (DST): UTC+02:00 (CEST)
- INSEE/Postal code: 14196 /14480
- ^{1} French Land Register data, which excludes lakes, ponds, glaciers > 1 km^{2} (0.386 sq mi or 247 acres) and river estuaries.

Crépon (French pronunciation: [kʁepɔ̃]) is a commune in the Calvados department in the Normandy region in northwestern France.

== Population ==
Historical population
Year	Pop.	±% p.a.
1968	241	—
1975	209	−2.01%
1982	203	−0.42%
1990	209	+0.36%
1999	199	−0.54%
2007	213	+0.85%
2012	218	+0.47%
2017	212	−0.56%
2023	222	+0.77%
Source: INSEE

== Architecture ==
Historic architecture :

- Parish church, Saint-Médard-et-Saint-Gildard, 12th-14th century
- Ferme de la Rançonnière (13th ‑ 15th);
- Manoir de Verdin (18th);
- Manoir du Clos de Mondeville (16th ‑ X19th);
- Manoir du Clos de Lhérondelle (17th);
- Manoir de la Grande Ferme (X17th);
- Manoir de Mathan (1st half of 17th - 1st half of 18th)
- Ferme du Colombier (18th - 1st quarter 19th);
- Manoir de la Baronnie et Ferme de la Baronnie (16th ‑ 19th);
- Ferme des Fontaines (1st half 18th).

== See also ==
- Communes of the Calvados department
