= Ferme de la Rançonnière =

Coordinates: 49°18′43″N 0°32′50″W

The Ferme de la Rançonniere is a farm located in the commune of Crépon, Calvados department, Normandy, France. The first buildings were constructed in the 13th century, when the residence was called La Ferme de Biéville. At that time, Normandy was suffering from the tensions between the English crown and the kingdom of France, which eventually evolved into the Hundred Years War. Since at least 1463 the fiefdom of Biéville, to which the farm belonged, was in the hands of the Chastel family, whose coat of arms can be found on the fresco painted on the round tower. Most of the farm was reconstructed in the first part of the 17th century; the tower, which had lost its spiral stairway, is the only remnant of the original farm. In 1710, the farm was acquired by the de la Rançonnière family, to which it owes its current name.

== Defences ==
Peasants who worked the land of La Rançonnière could take shelter with their animals in the large courtyard, where they could defend themselves against enemy invasions and were protected by the solid entryway, an example of medieval military architecture. The communal archives of Crépon attest to the existence of a tunnel between La Ferme and the castle of Cruelly, three kilometers away, used for moving herds and supplies during times of siege.

== Features ==
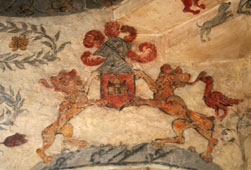

It was during this epoch that the fresco was painted in the round tower of the main building, which shows a dovecote with several hundred pigeonholes as well as the Chastel family coat of arms. La Ferme de la Rançonnière opens the round tower to the public during the Journées Européennes du Patrimoine. Today, one can still appreciate the Romanesque archways of the room that holds the monumental stone chimney; the exposed beams supporting the ceilings of the ground floor of the buildings; or the steep, ancient spiral stairway in the round tower.

Reconstructed in the 17th century, the covered entryway was listed in the Supplementary Inventory of Historic Monuments decreed June 15, 1927; the facades, roofs of the main building and outbuildings dating from the 17th century were also listed in decree of November 5, 1970.

== World War II ==
During the Second World War, La Ferme de la Rançonnière was subjected to new upheavals. The farm was requisitioned by the German army and served as a military camp. Surrounded by flat fields that offered good visibility, the farm became an air force base where enemy airplanes could easily take off and land.

Thanks to its close proximity to the D-Day beaches and Arromanches, the farm was quickly liberated in June 1944, during the liberation of France.

== Modern times ==
Today it has been carefully restored, and remains a residence with great charm, furnished with antiques and vintage objects d’art. In 2007, a garden was designed behind the buildings by a landscape architect; in 2008 La Ferme de la Rançonnière received first prize in the “Fleurir la France” contest.
