= Communauté de communes Cœur de Nacre =

Intercommunal structure in Normandy, France

Cœur de Nacre
- Communauté de communes
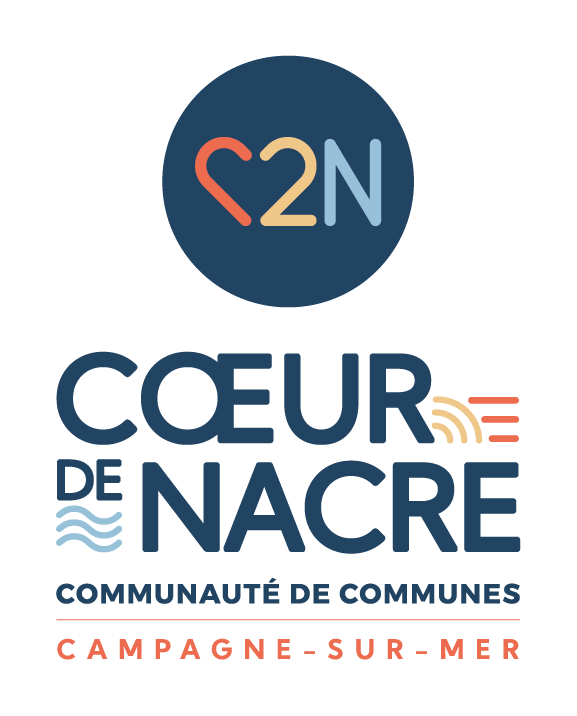
- Logo of the Communauté de communes Cœur de Nacre
- Interactive map of Cœur de Nacre
- Coordinates: 49°17′N 00°22′W
- Country: France
- Region: Normandy
- Department: Calvados
- No. of communes: {{{nbcomm}}}
- Established: 2003

Government
  - President: Thierry Lefort
- Area: 60.6 km^{2} (23.4 sq mi)
- Population (2021): 23,951
  - Density: 395/km^{2} (1,020/sq mi)
- Website: www.coeurdenacre.fr

Communauté de communes Cœur de Nacre is the intercommunal structure centered on the town of Douvres-la-Délivrande. It is located in Normandy, northwestern France. It was created in 2003 and its seat is in Douvres-la-Délivrande. Its area is 60.6 km^{2} (23.4 sq mi). As of 2021 its population was 23,951 with 5,097 people living in Douvres-la-Délivrande.

== Composition ==
Communauté de communes Cœur de Nacre is made up of the following 12 communes:

1. Anisy
2. Basly
3. Bernières-sur-Mer
4. Colomby-Anguerny
5. Courseulles-sur-Mer
6. Cresserons
7. Douvres-la-Délivrande
8. Langrune-sur-Mer
9. Luc-sur-Mer
10. Plumetot
11. Reviers
12. Saint-Aubin-sur-Mer
