= Cresserons =

- Commune
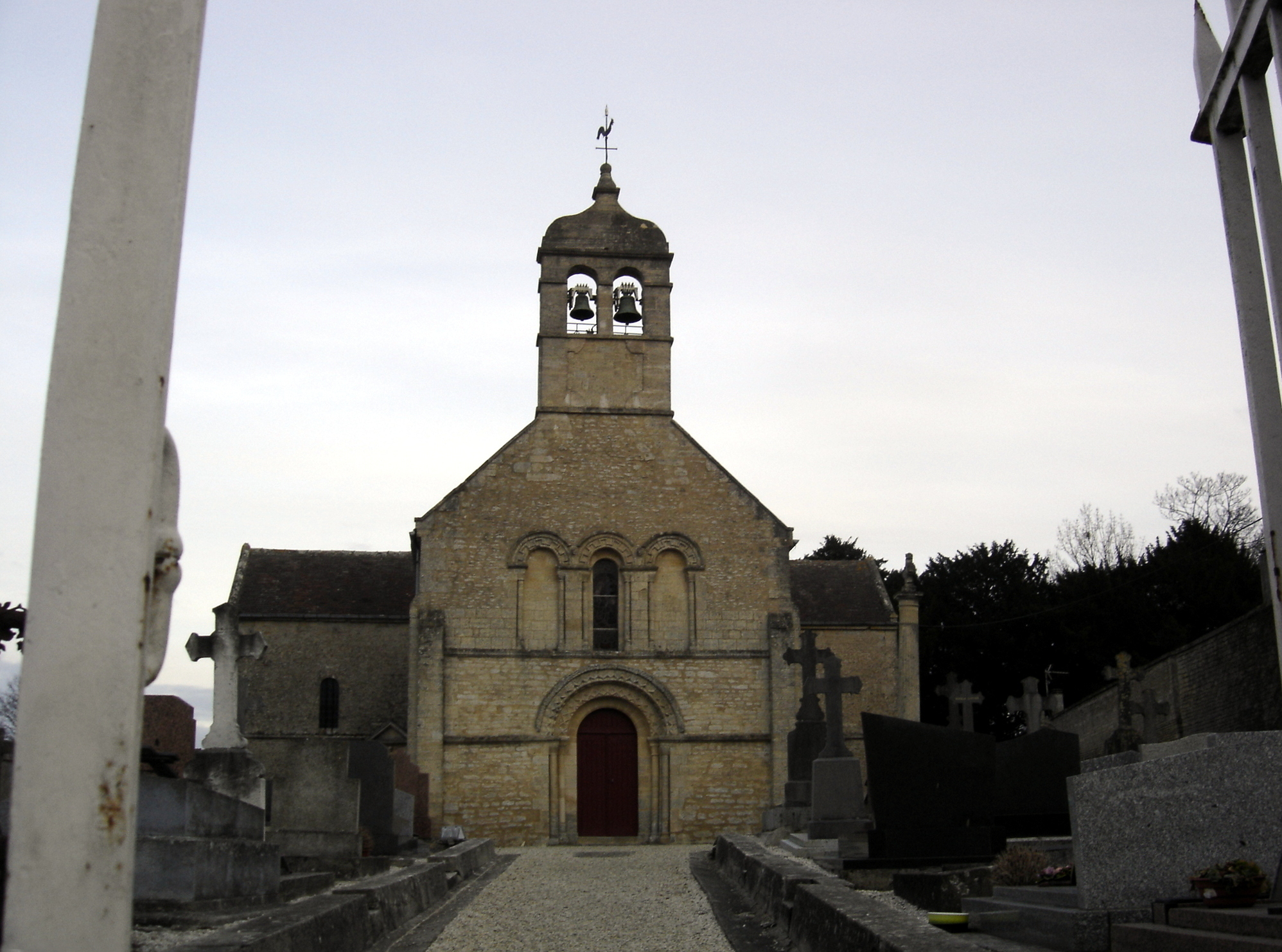
- The church in Cresserons
- Location of Cresserons
- Location within France Location within Normandy
- Coordinates: 49°17′19″N 0°21′12″W
- Country: France
- Region: Normandy
- Department: Calvados
- Arrondissement: Caen
- Canton: Courseulles-sur-Mer
- Intercommunality: CC Cœur de Nacre

Government
  - Mayor (2020–2026): Patrick Lermine
- Area^{1}: 3.59 km^{2} (1.39 sq mi)
- Elevation: 30 m (98 ft)
- Highest elevation: 59 m (194 ft)
- Lowest elevation: 17 m (56 ft)
- Population (2023): 1,068
  - Density: 297/km^{2} (771/sq mi)
- Time zone: UTC+01:00 (CET)
  - Summer (DST): UTC+02:00 (CEST)
- INSEE/Postal code: 14197 /14440
- ^{1} French Land Register data, which excludes lakes, ponds, glaciers > 1 km^{2} (0.386 sq mi or 247 acres) and river estuaries.

Cresserons is a commune in the Calvados department in the Normandy region in northwestern France.

Cresserons is located just south of the beaches of Normandy. During the Battle of Normandy in the Second World War, British troops arrived there and a battle was fought on 7 June 1944.

== Population ==
Historical population
Year	Pop.	±% p.a.
1968	393	—
1975	435	+1.46%
1982	785	+8.80%
1990	953	+2.45%
1999	1,202	+2.61%
2007	1,217	+0.16%
2012	1,205	−0.20%
2017	1,145	−1.02%
2023	1,068	−1.15%
Source: INSEE

== See also ==
- Communes of the Calvados department
