= Colomby-Anguerny =

- Commune
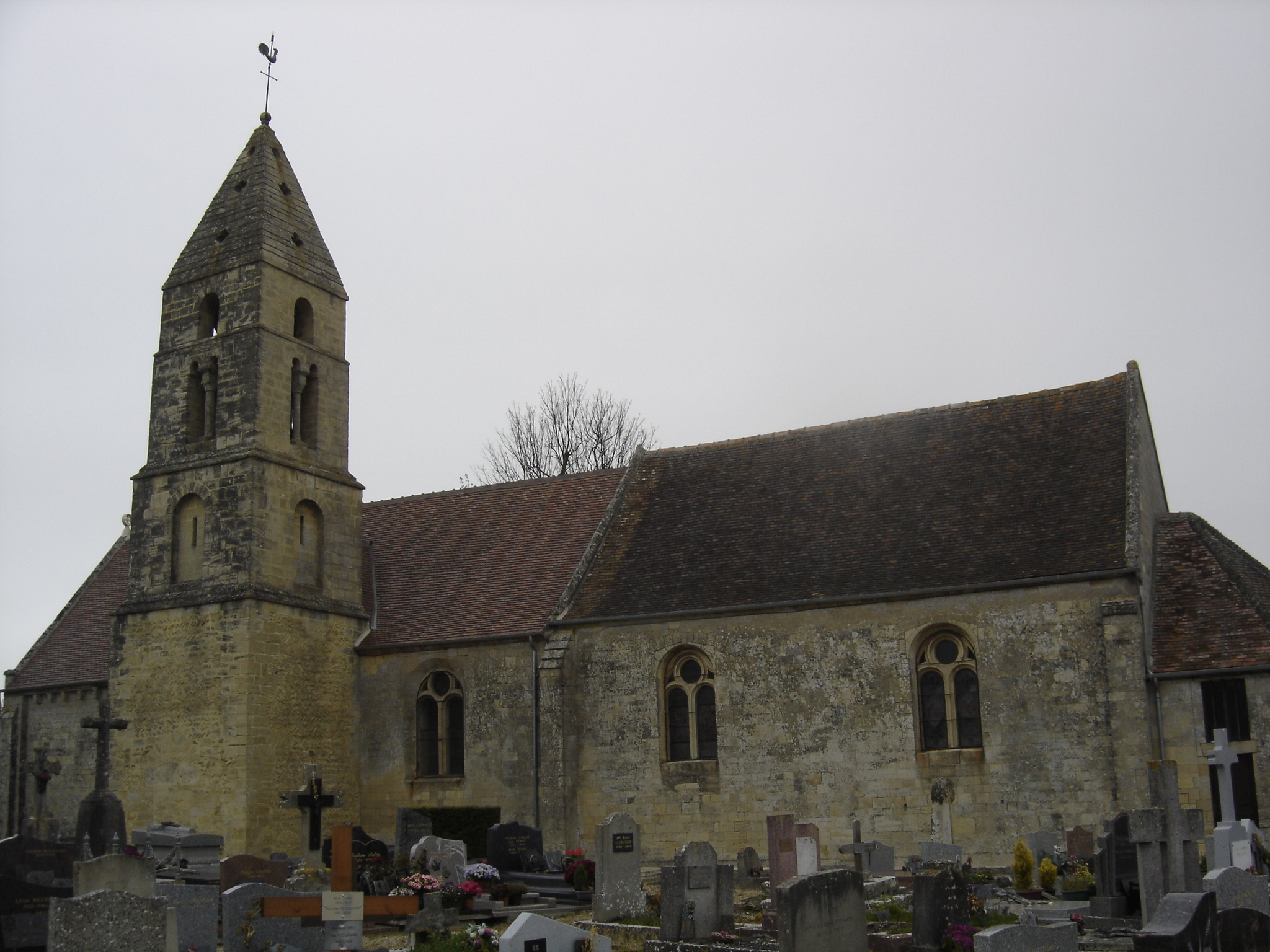
- The church in Anguerny
- Location of Colomby-Anguerny
- Location within France Location within Normandy
- Coordinates: 49°15′58″N 0°24′14″W
- Country: France
- Region: Normandy
- Department: Calvados
- Arrondissement: Caen
- Canton: Courseulles-sur-Mer
- Intercommunality: CC Cœur de Nacre

Government
  - Mayor (2020–2026): Jean-Luc Guillouard
- Area^{1}: 5.61 km^{2} (2.17 sq mi)
- Population (2023): 1,353
  - Density: 241/km^{2} (625/sq mi)
- Time zone: UTC+01:00 (CET)
  - Summer (DST): UTC+02:00 (CEST)
- INSEE/Postal code: 14014 /14610
- ^{1} French Land Register data, which excludes lakes, ponds, glaciers > 1 km^{2} (0.386 sq mi or 247 acres) and river estuaries.

Colomby-Anguerny (French pronunciation: [kɔlɔ̃bi ɑ̃ɡɛʁni]) is a commune in the department of Calvados, northwestern France. The municipality was established on 1 January 2016 by merger of the former communes of Colomby-sur-Thaon and Anguerny.

== See also ==
- Communes of the Calvados department
