= Manoir de Mathan =

Coordinates: 49°18′52″N 0°33′8″W

The Manoir de Mathan is a manor house located in the town of Crépon in the Calvados region of France.

The original structure was built in 1605, when it included a coach entry, which has since been removed. At that time, the manor belonged to the Hue de Mathan family after whom it was named. As well as the main house, there was a cellar, kitchen garden, and a bread oven in a separate outbuilding. A pond fed by a stream that flowed through the grounds completed the ensemble.

The building's most notable characteristics are its grand stone staircase, and the triangular pediments above the doors and the entryway.

A century after it was built, the west end of the building was extended to twice its original size; later a barn, storage building, and stables were added, arranged around a square courtyard. This is the current configuration of the manor. The building was raised slightly and a new entryway was constructed. An old-fashioned water pump has been preserved in the middle of the courtyard.

The Manoir de Mathan has been noted in the general inventory of the cultural patrimony of Low Normandy.
