= Plumetot =

- Commune
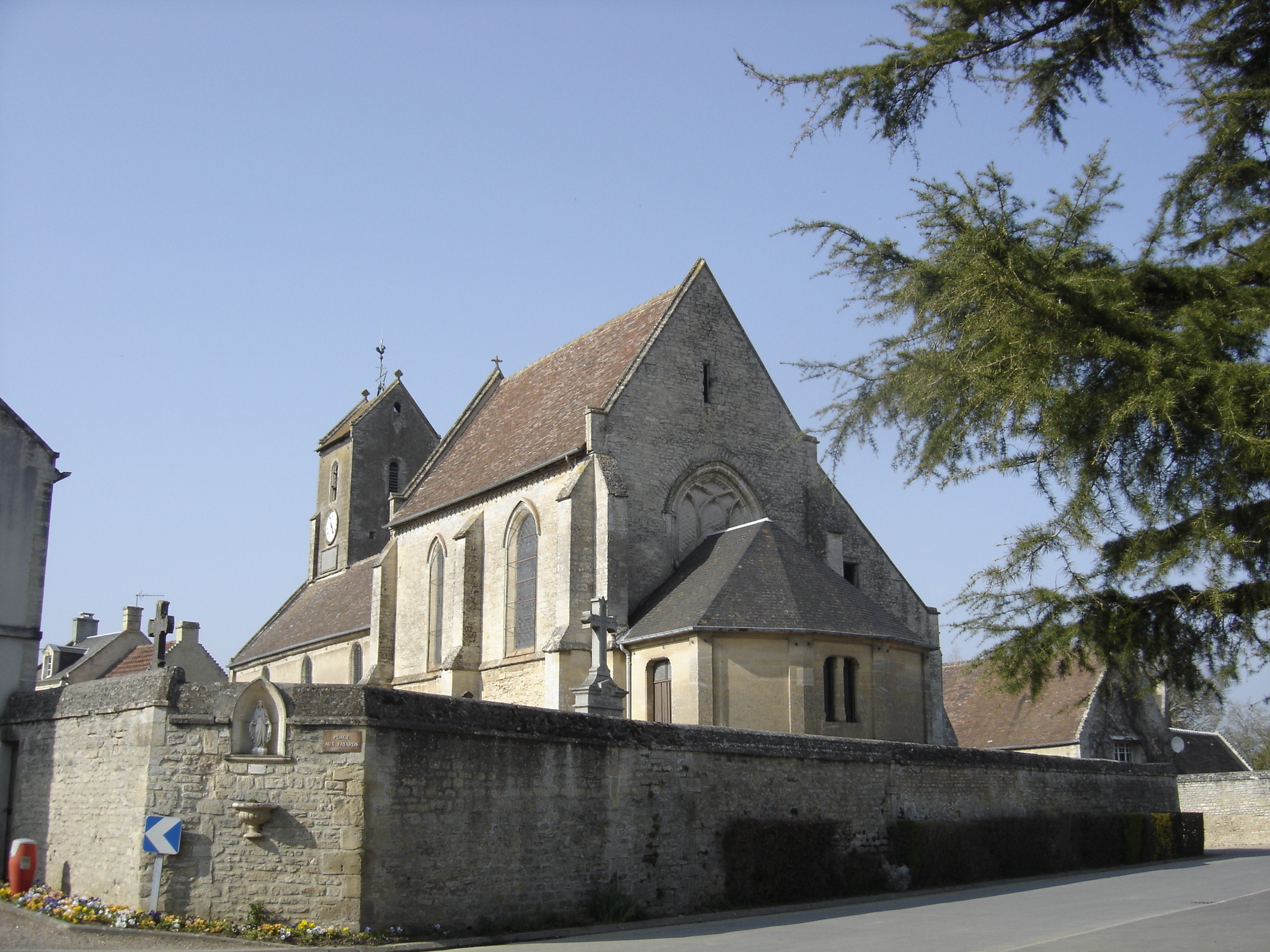
- The church in Plumetot
- Location of Plumetot
- Location within France Location within Normandy
- Coordinates: 49°16′49″N 0°21′23″W
- Country: France
- Region: Normandy
- Department: Calvados
- Arrondissement: Caen
- Canton: Courseulles-sur-Mer
- Intercommunality: CC Cœur de Nacre

Government
  - Mayor (2020–2026): Anne-Marie Marie
- Area^{1}: 1.23 km^{2} (0.47 sq mi)
- Elevation: 37 m (121 ft)
- Highest elevation: 59 m (194 ft)
- Lowest elevation: 29 m (95 ft)
- Population (2023): 200
  - Density: 160/km^{2} (420/sq mi)
- Time zone: UTC+01:00 (CET)
  - Summer (DST): UTC+02:00 (CEST)
- INSEE/Postal code: 14509 /14440
- ^{1} French Land Register data, which excludes lakes, ponds, glaciers > 1 km^{2} (0.386 sq mi or 247 acres) and river estuaries.

Plumetot (French pronunciation: [plym(ə)to]) is a commune in the Calvados department in the Normandy region in northwestern France.

== Population ==
Historical population
Year	Pop.	±% p.a.
1968	159	—
1975	163	+0.36%
1982	229	+4.98%
1990	260	+1.60%
1999	233	−1.21%
2007	215	−1.00%
2012	229	+1.27%
2017	215	−1.25%
2023	200	−1.20%
Source: INSEE

== See also ==
- Communes of the Calvados department
