= Langrune-sur-Mer =

- Commune
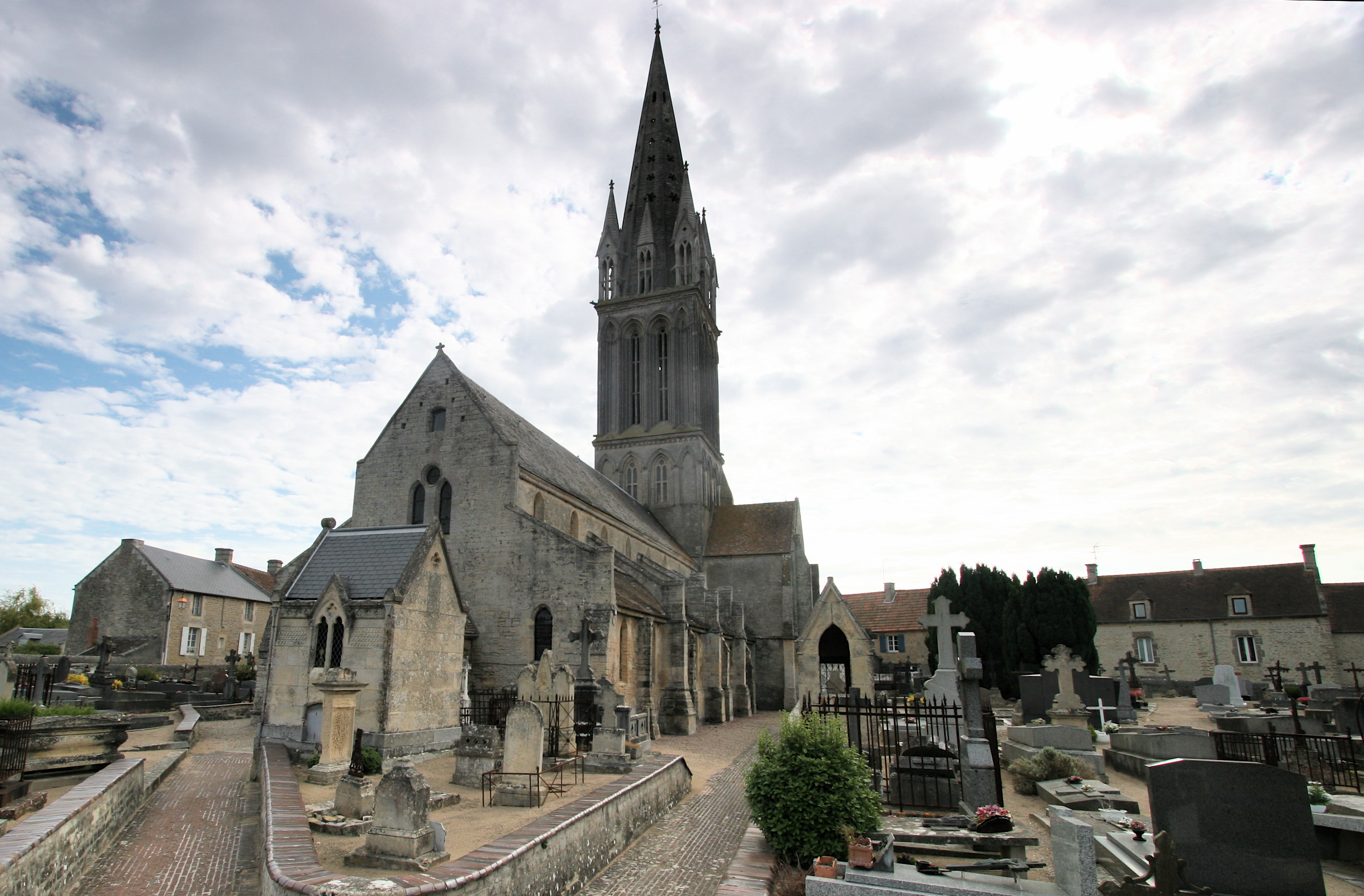
- The church in Langrune-sur-Mer

- Coat of arms
- Location of Langrune-sur-Mer
- Location within France Location within Normandy
- Coordinates: 49°19′23″N 0°22′18″W
- Country: France
- Region: Normandy
- Department: Calvados
- Arrondissement: Caen
- Canton: Courseulles-sur-Mer
- Intercommunality: CC Cœur de Nacre

Government
  - Mayor (2020–2026): Jean-Luc Guingouain
- Area^{1}: 4.74 km^{2} (1.83 sq mi)
- Elevation: 12 m (39 ft)
- Highest elevation: 34 m (112 ft)
- Lowest elevation: 3 m (9.8 ft)
- Population (2023): 1,916
  - Density: 404/km^{2} (1,050/sq mi)
- Time zone: UTC+01:00 (CET)
  - Summer (DST): UTC+02:00 (CEST)
- INSEE/Postal code: 14354 /14830
- ^{1} French Land Register data, which excludes lakes, ponds, glaciers > 1 km^{2} (0.386 sq mi or 247 acres) and river estuaries.

Langrune-sur-Mer (French pronunciation: [lɑ̃ɡʁyn syʁ mɛʁ], literally Langrune on Sea) is a commune in the Calvados department in the Normandy region in northwestern France.

In June 2026, U.S. Secretary of Defence Pete Hegseth cancelled an appearance at a D-day event in Langrune-sur-Mer after protests by residents.

== Population ==
Historical population
Year	Pop.	±% p.a.
1968	950	—
1975	1,047	+1.40%
1982	1,349	+3.69%
1990	1,539	+1.66%
1999	1,706	+1.15%
2007	1,723	+0.12%
2012	1,743	+0.23%
2017	1,824	+0.91%
2023	1,916	+0.82%
Source: INSEE

== International relations ==
The commune has been twinned with Fishbourne, UK since 1998.

== See also ==
- Communes of the Calvados department
