= Bernières-sur-Mer =

- Commune
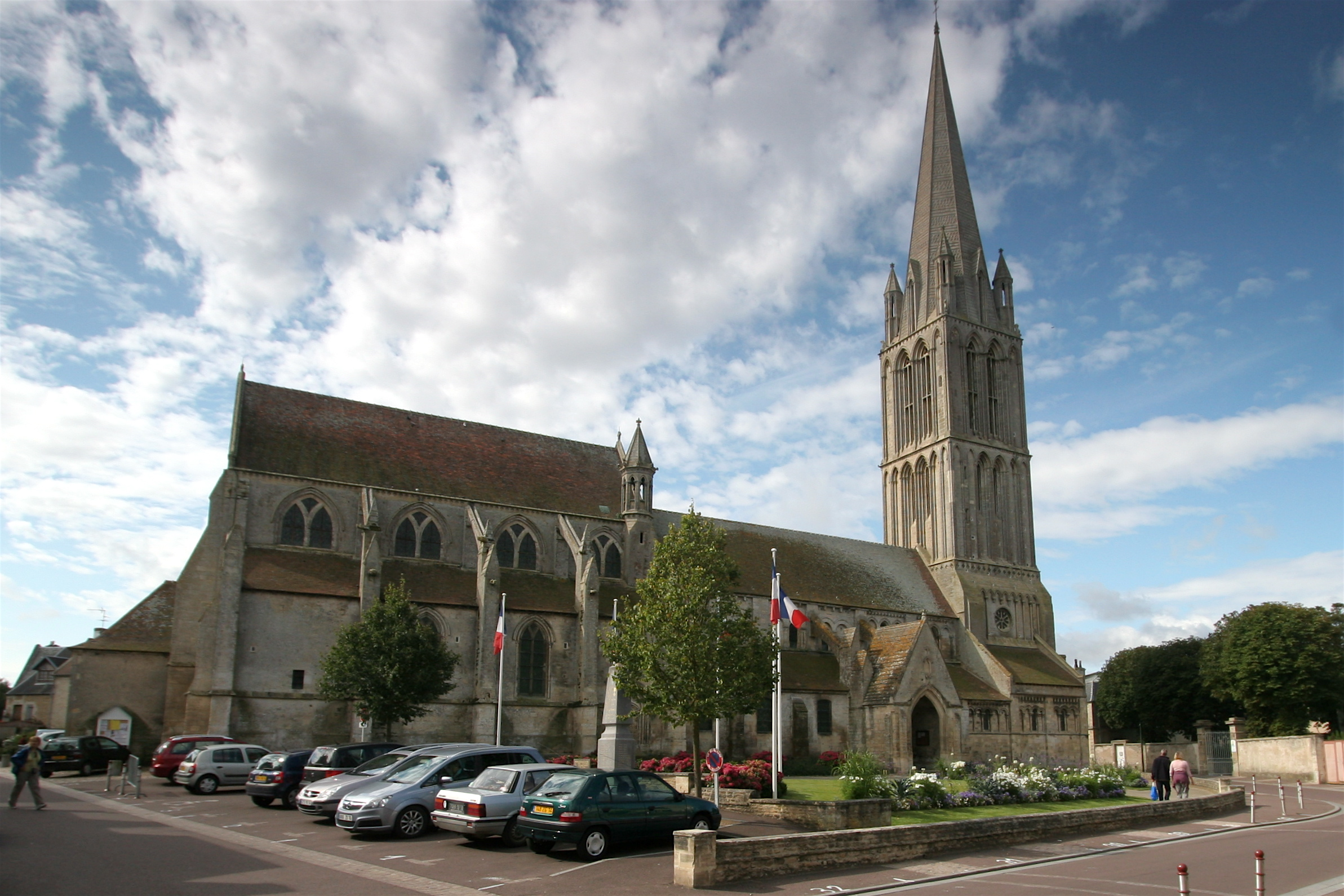
- Notre Dame

- Coat of arms
- Location of Bernières-sur-Mer
- Location within France Location within Normandy
- Coordinates: 49°19′59″N 0°25′14″W
- Country: France
- Region: Normandy
- Department: Calvados
- Arrondissement: Caen
- Canton: Courseulles-sur-Mer
- Intercommunality: CC Cœur de Nacre

Government
  - Mayor (2020–2026): Thomas Dupont Federici
- Area^{1}: 7.66 km^{2} (2.96 sq mi)
- Elevation: 4 m (13 ft)
- Highest elevation: 55 m (180 ft)
- Lowest elevation: 0 m (0 ft)
- Population (2023): 2,437
  - Density: 318/km^{2} (824/sq mi)
- Time zone: UTC+01:00 (CET)
  - Summer (DST): UTC+02:00 (CEST)
- INSEE/Postal code: 14066 /14990
- ^{1} French Land Register data, which excludes lakes, ponds, glaciers > 1 km^{2} (0.386 sq mi or 247 acres) and river estuaries.

Bernières-sur-Mer (French pronunciation: [bɛʁnjɛʁ syʁ mɛʁ], literally Bernières on Sea), in the arrondissement of Caen, is a commune in the Calvados department of Normandy, in northwestern France. It is part of the canton of Courseulles-sur-Mer. It lies on the English Channel coast, 3 km east of Courseulles-sur-Mer, and 17 km north of Caen.

Bernières-sur-Mer is one of the oldest towns of the Côte de Nacre. Gallo-Roman traces are scattered on the territory of the municipality, and are visible in the cliffs of the "Cape Romain" east of the town. The Middle Ages saw the prosperity of Bernières - enjoying the magnificence of William the Conqueror. The Church of Bernières illustrates perfectly evolution of the region during the first half of the second millennium. In the early 20th century, served by the railway, its hotels and sandy beach, surrounded by dunes and the embankment welcomed visitors from across France.

The town was liberated by The Queen's Own Rifles of Canada on 6 June 1944 as part of the leading assault wave of D-Day Operation Overlord. Later, Le Régiment de la Chaudière, landed in reserve as part of the 8th Canadian Brigade, 3rd Canadian Division. The remains of the Atlantic Wall are still visible and are a place of remembrance where Berniérais honor each year the memory of the Canadians.

== History: World War II ==
=== The Occupation ===
Across Calvados, the Occupation began a month before The June 1940 Armistice, it establishing first a German Occupied Zone and a Vichy Unoccupied Zone, retaining nominally the civil jurisdiction of Vichy over all of France, except for Alsace-Lorraine. The (German) Military Command in France: Militärbefehlshaber in Frankreich (MBF), succeeding the Military Administration in France (Militärverwaltung in Frankreich), from the outset was the principal executive and decision-making protagonist in the (Northern) Occupied Zone. The presence of Vichy authorities allowed it to focus on the security of its occupying troops, and the efficient industrial economic exploitation of France. The ‘Occupied Zone’ was divided into Military Administration Districts (Militärverwaltungsbezirk), with Regional Oberfeldkommandanturen, they into Departmental Military Administration (FK. Feldkommandanturen) and they into the Military Administration Prefecture (KK. Kreiskommandanturen. All initially employed the Feldgendarmerie (FG. German Military Police) having local police powers, and the Geheime Feldpolizei (GFP. Secret Field Police), conducting important investigations, and later the Sicherheitspolizei (Sipo. Security Police of the Sicherheitsdienst SD. Security Service), persons arrested appeared before military tribunals, which had been set up in each Département (FK).

Bernières-sur-Mer sat inside the ‘Coastal Military Zone’ - set-out in the October 1941, along The Atlantic and The Channel Coasts, from the Basses-Pyrénées to the Pas-de-Calais / Nord; with a geographic depth extending up to 30 km. First designated as ‘Entry Prohibited’ – restricted to those who had lived there for at least three months (principal residents), civil service Vichy personnel, those working for the German army, and the personnel of the SNCF. In 1943 the MBK ordered a partial ‘evacuation’ of the Coastal Military Zone, in the interests of the French population "…en cas d'événements graves dans les communes." All residents designated non-essential to public services, industrial enterprises, agriculture, forestry and supply services, had to depart by 30 April, targeting the most vulnerable, children and the elderly; though enforcement was uneven. The CMZ was classified as ‘Entry Forbidden’- except to ‘essential civilians’ in April 1944, some cities and towns designated for evacuation.

Basse Normandie fell within the rubric of Militärverwaltungsbezirk ‘Bezirk A’ - Nordwestfrankreich (North / West France) with its Headquarters (Stab) at Paris: St. Germain-en-Laye. Calvados-Baie de Seine came under an immediate Bezirk ‘A’ subordinate Oberfeldkommandanturen: Oberfeldkommandantur ‘Seine-Maritime’ (Stab. Rouen 1941). With an Feldkommandantur FK established in each Canton Prefecture, working with the Department Préfet, FK 723 Caen (Feldpostnummer 12067) was created on 20 May 1940, it tasked with the upholding of order and security, taking measures to prevent sabotage and anti-German activity. Feldkommandantur FK 723 Caen its City KK, Kreis-Kommandantur 884 Caen responsible for coastal towns of the JUNO Sector, also oversaw the ‘sous-préfectures’ du Calvados: Kreis-Kommandantur 789 Bayeux, Kreis-Kommandantur 774 Lisieux, Kreis-Kommandantur 763 Vire. This all changing in June 1942 with the arrival of The Sicherheitspolizei Sipo-SD Security Police and the centralization of repression, with their prime task of hunting of foreign agents. KdS (Kommandos der SIPO und des SD) were established across France, at the Regional (Provincial) Directorate Level. The Sipo-SD first established itself in Calvados through KdS Rouen (Seine-Maritime / Normandie) and its ‘Section Exterieures / Détachement’ Außendienststelle Caen (Département Calvados).

=== D-Day ===
At the beginning of the Battle of Normandy, the 3rd Canadian Infantry Division, commanded by Major General Rodney Keller, landed 15,000 Canadians and 9,000 British troops on the Calvados coast. Bernières-sur-Mer, one of five Canadian landing sites, was located to the eastern end of Canada's assigned landing sector of Juno Beach. On D-Day, the 8th Canadian Infantry (Assault) Brigade Group, stormed the beach, landing The Queen's Own Rifles of Canada, the 10th Armoured Regiment (The Fort Garry Horse), and the guns of the 14th Canadian Field Regiment, RCA, to engage troops of the Bataillon II./Grenadier-Regiment 736, who garrisoned the town's fortified 'Resistance Nest'.

Widerstandnesten WN 28 (NAN White) was located at North 49.335696 Degrees / West 00.419942 Degrees and in June 1944 for targeting purposes was at: LCC MR Grid 997855 (Ref. GSGS 4250 1:50K: Creully Sheet 7E/5). The (WN) Resistance Nest at Bernières-sur-Mer was a reinforced platoon sized position, incorporating multiple concrete (Verstärkt Feltmessig: Vf Type 2) gun casemates, with additional observation and crewed fighting positions, located to dominate the beach exits, into town. A well prepared position, extending across much of the beach front, Hauptmann Rudolf Gruter, Kdr Kompanie 5./ Grenadier-Regiment 736./ Bataillon II., and his Ko Stab Gruppen located in Bernières, was well engaged, under naval bombardment, from before the Canadian H-Hr (07h55 BST). Having a wider frontage, the crew served weapon sites were not joined by an integrated network of trenches, but its rear was ‘protected’ by three fences of barbed wire. Approaches into the position were protected by three K.V. Gruppe Courseulles minefields. The left front (NW) sea approach, and beachfront, above the left seawall were protected by a large Beach Minefield: Mf 58. The right front (NE) land approach was protected Beach Minefield: Mf 57 and its rear and right flank by tactical minefield: Mf 55. A battalion heavy mortar detachment (Nest fur schweren Granatenwerfer) located 150 yards behind the beach, additionally supported the position, it protected by an anti-vehicle ditch, south of the railway line.

The coastline on which NAN White was set out is low lying, from Courseulles to Bernieres sur Mer there was a sandy beach with short groynes to prevent lateral movement of sand by the current. Offshore all the way along the coast eastwards of Bernieres sur Mer there were rocky outcrops parts of which were exposed at low tide: les Iles de Bernieres. WN 28 began to take indirect fire, from the LCT(Mk4) embarked SP (105mm) artillery of 14th Canadian Field Regiment, RCA from 07h44 BST, it having little effect on the defenders at MR 998852, as the position included five Unterstands Type R501/R502 Personnel Shelters. For 35 minutes they fired a steady barrage onto the beaches (H-30 to H+5), it not as tight as had been attained in some training exercises.

As programmed two volleys of 5" Rocket Fire then arrived, to disrupt any movement about the position, and a volley of 60 lb Hedgerows fell about the flanks, cutting the wire entanglements and detonating the mines, securing the approaches onto the position and its casemates. Because the tide was much higher than expected and the beach narrow and congested, the assaulting companies did not initially benefit from direct fire support from ‘B’ Squadron, 10th Canadian Armoured Regiment, The Fort Garry Horse, as they did not arrive as planned.

The Resistance Nest was overcome by two companies of The Queen's Own Rifles of Canada, its ‘A’ Company (O.C. Major H. E. Dalton) landing at 08h12, west of WN 28a, (at MR Grid 989855) on an ‘open’ left flank, an unguarded German flank seldom to be found. Intending to land east of the town, between Bernières and St Aubin, ‘B’ Company (O.C. Major C.O. Dalton) landed directly on the edge of WN 28, at 08h15, taking 65 serious casualties, 200 yards east of their intended landing site (at MR Grid 998995). ‘A’ Company got off the beach quickly, taking heavy machine gun fire, over the grass fields, just east of WN 28, it reaching the railway line. Having been being pinned down by heavy mortar fire, by 08h45 BST, it 'cleared' the road through the village at its southwest point. A weakened ‘B’ Company scaled the sea wall, got off the beach, and outflanking the most serious threats, got into town by 09h00 BST, having seen some support from 'B' Squadron engaging casements and weapon-pits from their beach positions.

79 Armoured Division (UK) Assault Engineers, having landed two AVRE Teams it was almost 09h30 before the exits were open and 'B' Squadron could move into town to support of 'B' and 'A' Companies. Between 09h10 and 09h30, the self-propelled guns of 14th Field Regiment, RCA landed onto a narrow, crowded, and chaotic beach. Three batteries getting off the beach, they had 18 guns in action, to the right of Bernières by 11h30. The regiment spent most of the day in action in improvised gun areas close to Bernières, crest clearances hampering the action of the guns. Receiving the worst battering of any Canadian unit on D-Day, the Queen's Own Rifles suffered 60 killed and 78 wounded, in the fight for Bernières-sur-Mer.

German Crew Served Weapons at WN 28 Bernières-sur-Mer. The casements took innumerable direct hits, doing little more than denting the concrete.

Regelbau Type	Ringstand (Casement)	Weapon / Gun	Details
OB Gr.West Vf 600v	KwK SK Small Hood (Haube)	50mm Pak 39 L/60 (Long)	Open Pedestal - at La Cassine
OB Gr.W Type Heer 604	Panzerstellung Tobrouk	37 mm Renault FT 331(f)	Tank Turret – On Right Flank
OB Gr.W Type 34 (Vf69)	Tobrouk sGranatwerfer	8.14 cm Heavy Mortar	On Seawall Right Flank
Heer Vf Rs58c - 80 cm	Reinforced Tobrouk x3	Heavy MG (Crewed)	One Facing Rue Victor Tesniere
Weapon Crew Posts x3	Reinforced Vf Ringstands	Light MG - Half-Steel Rings	Open Crew Fighting Posts
Mortar Crew Winged Pit	Nest fur schweren Granatenwerfer	2 x 8.14 cm Battalion Mortar	Gruppen - At Train Station
Open Earthwork Type 1 Fa	Log Crib Timber - with H608	75mm FK 231(f) (1933)	7.5 cm Sprgr.231/1(f)

WN 28b at Bernières-sur-Mer (West) was located at North 49Deg 20Min 04Sec and West 00Deg 25Min 40Sec and in June 1944 for targeting purposes was at: LCC MR Grid 993855 (Ref. GSGS 4250 1:50K: Creully Sheet 7E/5). Sited west of the town, supporting his left flank, Hauptmann Rudolf Gruter, of Ko 5./ Bataillon II./ 736., had sited a Log Type Feltmessige Anlage: Fa)Crib Timber and Earth Field Emplacement, to shelter two 50mm PaK 38 Anti-Tank Guns. It did not contribute to fight at Bernières-sur-Mer (WN28), having been neutralized by the Task Force ‘J’ Naval Beach Bombardment Drenching Fire Programme, this before H-Hr at 07h55 BST. The landing of ‘A’ Company, The Queen's Own Rifles of Canada, at MR Grid 989855, occurred west of this now abandoned position.

== Population ==
Historical population

Year	Pop.	±% p.a.
1793	1,245	—
1800	1,288	+0.49%
1806	1,403	+1.44%
1821	1,443	+0.19%
1831	1,482	+0.27%
1836	1,460	−0.30%
1841	1,368	−1.29%
1846	1,414	+0.66%
1851	1,378	−0.51%
1856	1,301	−1.14%
1861	1,198	−1.64%
1866	1,235	+0.61%
1872	1,130	−1.47%
1876	1,078	−1.17%
1881	966	−2.17%
1886	916	−1.06%
1891	836	−1.81%
1896	807	−0.70%
1901	864	+1.37%

Year	Pop.	±% p.a.
1906	876	+0.28%
1911	820	−1.31%
1921	812	−0.10%
1926	740	−1.84%
1931	815	+1.95%
1936	803	−0.30%
1946	981	+2.02%
1954	1,065	+1.03%
1962	930	−1.68%
1968	964	+0.60%
1975	1,053	+1.27%
1982	1,548	+5.66%
1990	1,563	+0.12%
1999	1,882	+2.09%
2007	2,379	+2.97%
2012	2,336	−0.36%
2017	2,308	−0.24%
2023	2,437	+0.91%

Source: EHESS and INSEE (1968-2023)

== Twin towns ==
- Eisingen, Bavaria, Germany since 1994.

== See also ==
- Juno Beach
- Communes of the Calvados department
