= Reviers =

- Commune
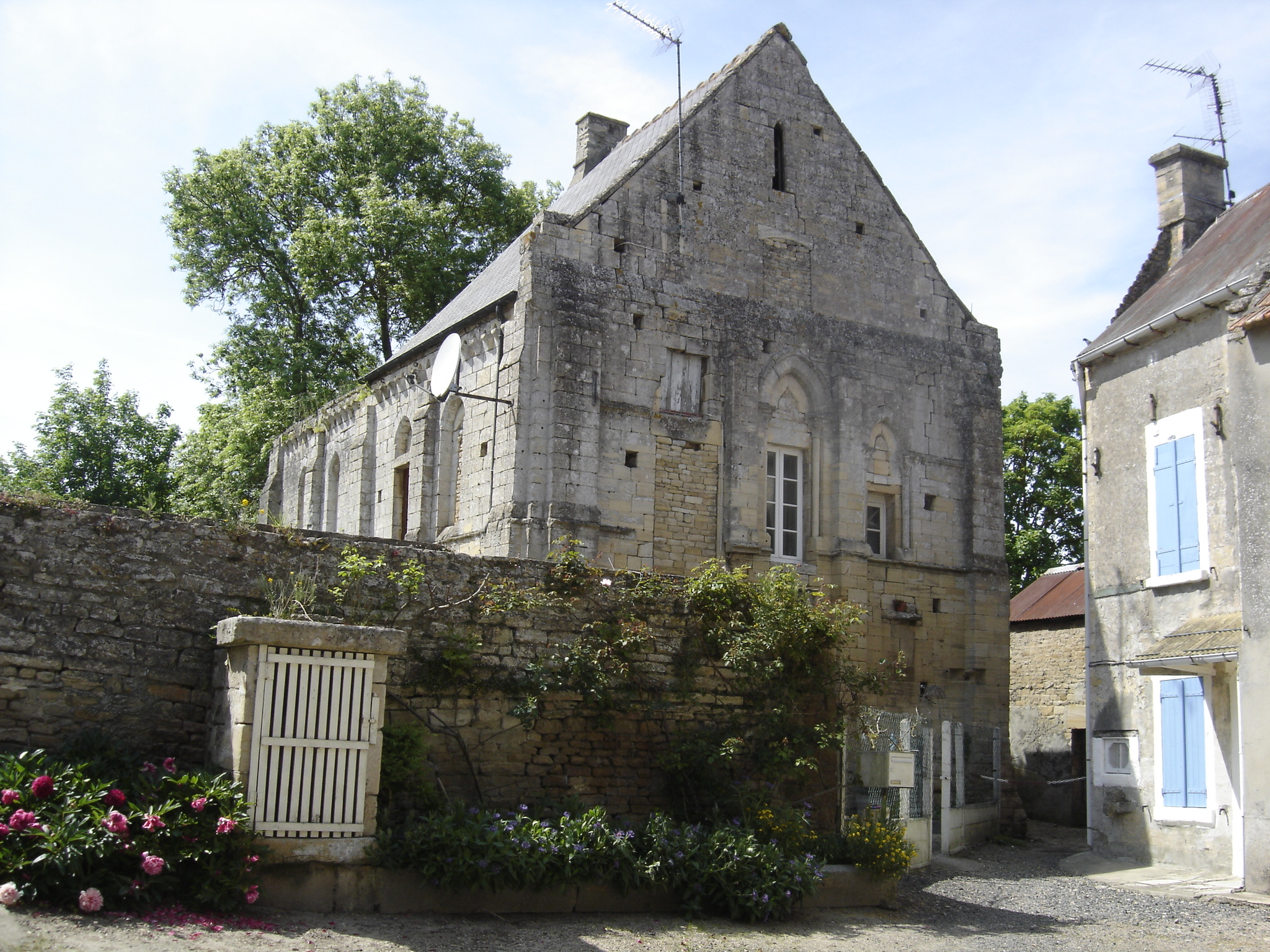
- The chapel in Reviers

- Coat of arms
- Location of Reviers
- Location within France Location within Normandy
- Coordinates: 49°18′09″N 0°27′47″W
- Country: France
- Region: Normandy
- Department: Calvados
- Arrondissement: Caen
- Canton: Thue et Mue
- Intercommunality: CC Cœur de Nacre

Government
  - Mayor (2020–2026): Daniel Guérin
- Area^{1}: 4.38 km^{2} (1.69 sq mi)
- Elevation: 25 m (82 ft)
- Highest elevation: 54 m (177 ft)
- Lowest elevation: 2 m (6.6 ft)
- Population (2023): 627
  - Density: 143/km^{2} (371/sq mi)
- Time zone: UTC+01:00 (CET)
  - Summer (DST): UTC+02:00 (CEST)
- INSEE/Postal code: 14535 /14470
- ^{1} French Land Register data, which excludes lakes, ponds, glaciers > 1 km^{2} (0.386 sq mi or 247 acres) and river estuaries.

Reviers (French pronunciation: [ʁəvje]) is a commune in the Calvados department in the Normandy region, in northwestern France. It lies 4 km south of Courseulles-sur-Mer and 15 kn northwest of Caen. It lies at the confluence of the rivers Seulles and Mue. There is bridge west of Reviers, crossing the Seulles, on the principal road (D176) connecting to Colombiers-sur-Seulles, and a bridge in Reviers, crossing the Mue, on the principal road (D35), connecting east to Tailleville.

== History: D-Day ==
Reviers was the object of one tactical engagement, on D-Day, it to secure the bridge over La Mue. Additionally, in securing the village, the headquarters of two German units, of 716 Infantrie-Division, that caused much havoc with the Canadians on D-Day, were taken. The Regina Rifle Regiment (7 CIB Assault), landing its second wave on NAN Green at 08h55, saw 'D' Company, (OC Major J.V. Love - KIA 06.06.44) after fighting through town, reduced to forty-nine men, re-organized and set out to Reviers, at 09h30, tasked to seize the bridge over the Mue River.

In making an exit east of Courseulles-sur-Mer, bypassing the fight for WN30, the Canadians first encountered remnants of a platoon (Züg) of Kompanie 2. /Pz.Jg-Abt 716., with three 7.5 cm Pak 40, in an open field emplacement, on Les Champs des Fers, it much weakened by the Naval Beach Drenching Fire Programme. Driving south, Kompanie 2./ Ost-Bataillon 441., positioned southeast of Courseulles-sur-Mer, at Les Rotys, attempted to block their movement. Much weakened, also by the Naval Beach Drenching Fire Programme, elements of the Kompanie 2, had 'left' their positions, ordered to join Kompanie 8. / II 736., at Les Ruines St Ursin, east of Reviers.

'D' Company, The Regina Rifle Regiment, now approaching from the North, down The D170, arrived in Reviers at 11h00 and the ‘bridge was reported clear at 12h15', without damage to the village. With 'C' Company and Battalion Headquarters (The Regina Rifle Regiment) arriving at 15h00, reorganized, it and the battalion moved south, remaining West of la Mue. At 19h00, coming up from Courseulles, ‘A’ Company was ordered to remain in Reviers to guard the approaches to the town and the bridge.

Needing to be close to their District Sector Defence Commander, KVU-Gr. Seulles - Kdr Hauptmann Deptolla (Kdr Bataillon II. / 736.) Gefechtsstand: Château de Tailleville at WN 23, in Reviers, east of the Seulles, were located two German headquarters.

- Gefechtsstand Stab: Northeast of Reviers - GHQ Heeres-schwere-Artillerie-Abteilung 989. (Heeresgruppe-Reserve, Attached to 716 Inf-Div) having command over three batteries, deployed Southwest of Basly (Moved to Bénouville), at Amblie (East of The Seulles), and its third East of Creully.
- Gefechtsstand Stab: Kompanie 2. (StuG) / Panzerjäger-Abtielung 716., having command over three platoons (Zug) deployed at Graye-sur-Mer: Hameau de la Valette, Courseulles-sur-Mer: Champs des Fers, and Berniers-sur-Mer: Les Perruques. Kompanie 2./ Panzerjäger-Abteilung 716., was ordered established on 25 Dec 43, to consist of three platoons (Zug): x2 with three 7.5 cm ATk guns each, and x1 with two 8.8 cm ATk guns. to be deployed consistent with the Division Commanders direction.

Note 1. The Bridge over la Seulles (depicted on maps as: Pont de Reviers) was secured by 1st Bn - The Canadian Scottish Regiment on 06.06.1944, without damage.

== Population ==
Historical population
| Year | Pop. | ±% p.a. |
|---|---|---|
| 1968 | 330 | — |
| 1975 | 361 | +1.29% |
| 1982 | 399 | +1.44% |
| 1990 | 398 | −0.03% |
| 1999 | 479 | +2.08% |
| 2007 | 558 | +1.93% |
| 2012 | 583 | +0.88% |
| 2017 | 566 | −0.59% |
| 2023 | 627 | +1.72% |
Source: INSEE

== See also ==
- Communes of the Calvados department
