= Thaon =

- Commune
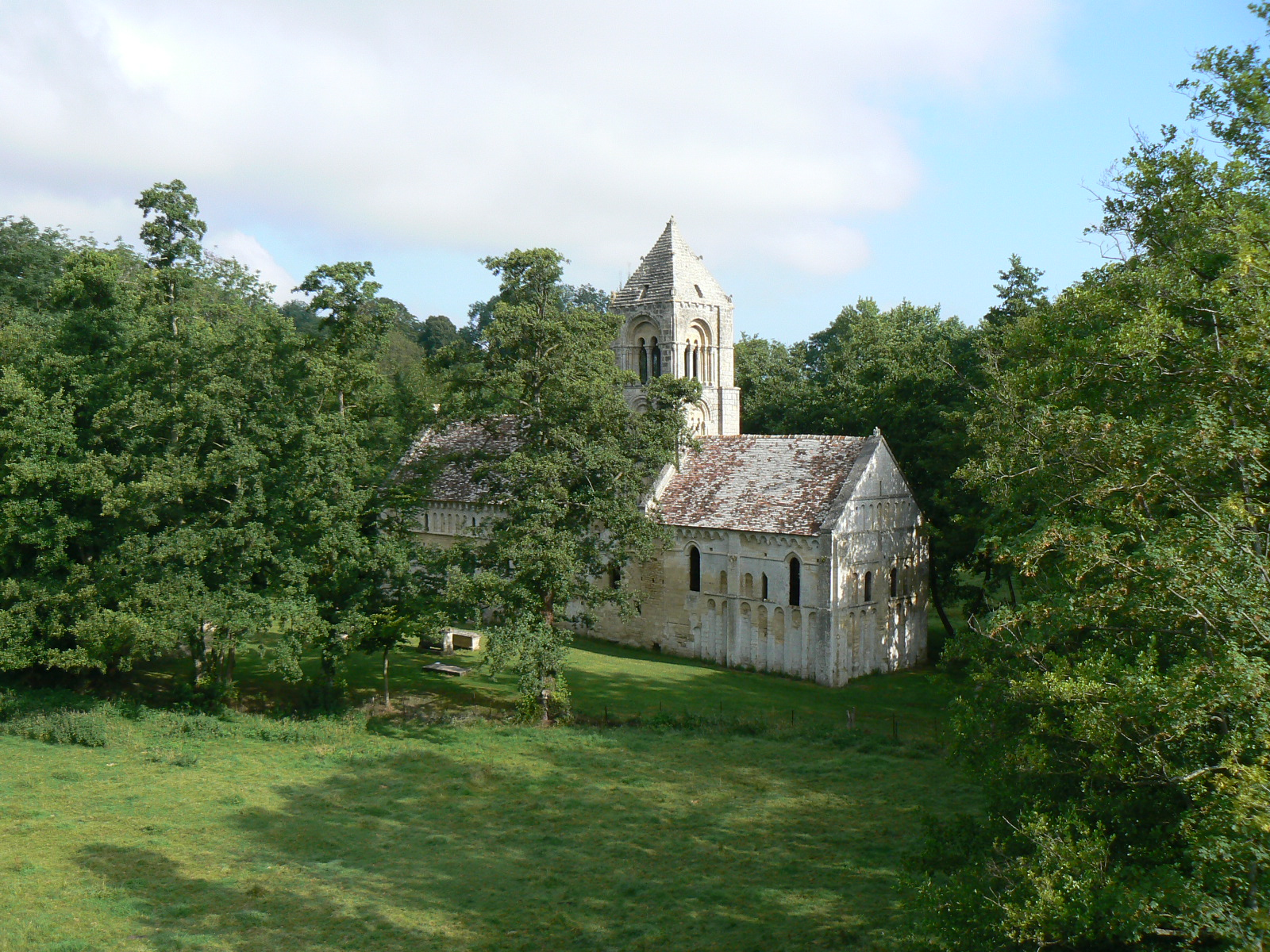
- Saint Pierre
- Location of Thaon
- Location within France Location within Normandy
- Coordinates: 49°15′31″N 0°27′16″W
- Country: France
- Region: Normandy
- Department: Calvados
- Arrondissement: Caen
- Canton: Thue et Mue
- Intercommunality: CU Caen la Mer

Government
  - Mayor (2020–2026): Richard Maury
- Area^{1}: 8.30 km^{2} (3.20 sq mi)
- Elevation: 25 m (82 ft)
- Highest elevation: 66 m (217 ft)
- Lowest elevation: 17 m (56 ft)
- Population (2023): 1,894
  - Density: 228/km^{2} (591/sq mi)
- Time zone: UTC+01:00 (CET)
  - Summer (DST): UTC+02:00 (CEST)
- INSEE/Postal code: 14685 /14610
- ^{1} French Land Register data, which excludes lakes, ponds, glaciers > 1 km^{2} (0.386 sq mi or 247 acres) and river estuaries.

Thaon (French pronunciation: [tɑ̃]) is a commune in the Calvados department in the Normandy region in northwestern France.

== Population ==
Historical population
Year	Pop.	±% p.a.
1968	573	—
1975	768	+4.27%
1982	1,146	+5.88%
1990	1,153	+0.08%
1999	1,350	+1.77%
2007	1,470	+1.07%
2012	1,453	−0.23%
2017	1,571	+1.57%
2023	1,894	+3.17%
Source: INSEE

== See also ==
- Communes of the Calvados department
