= Canton of Courseulles-sur-Mer =

Coordinates: 49.33°N 0.46°W

- Canton
- Situation of the canton of Courseulles-sur-Mer in the department of Calvados
- Country: France
- Region: Normandy
- Department: Calvados
- No. of communes: {{{nbcomm}}}
- Population (2023): 28,814
- INSEE code: 1411

The canton of Courseulles-sur-Mer is an administrative division of the Calvados department, northwestern France. It was created at the French canton reorganisation which came into effect in March 2015. Its seat is in Courseulles-sur-Mer.

It consists of the following communes:

1. Anisy
2. Arromanches-les-Bains
3. Asnelles
4. Banville
5. Basly
6. Bazenville
7. Bernières-sur-Mer
8. Colomby-Anguerny
9. Courseulles-sur-Mer
10. Crépon
11. Cresserons
12. Douvres-la-Délivrande
13. Graye-sur-Mer
14. Langrune-sur-Mer
15. Luc-sur-Mer
16. Meuvaines
17. Plumetot
18. Saint-Aubin-sur-Mer
19. Saint-Côme-de-Fresné
20. Sainte-Croix-sur-Mer
21. Ver-sur-Mer
