= Douvres-la-Délivrande =

- Commune
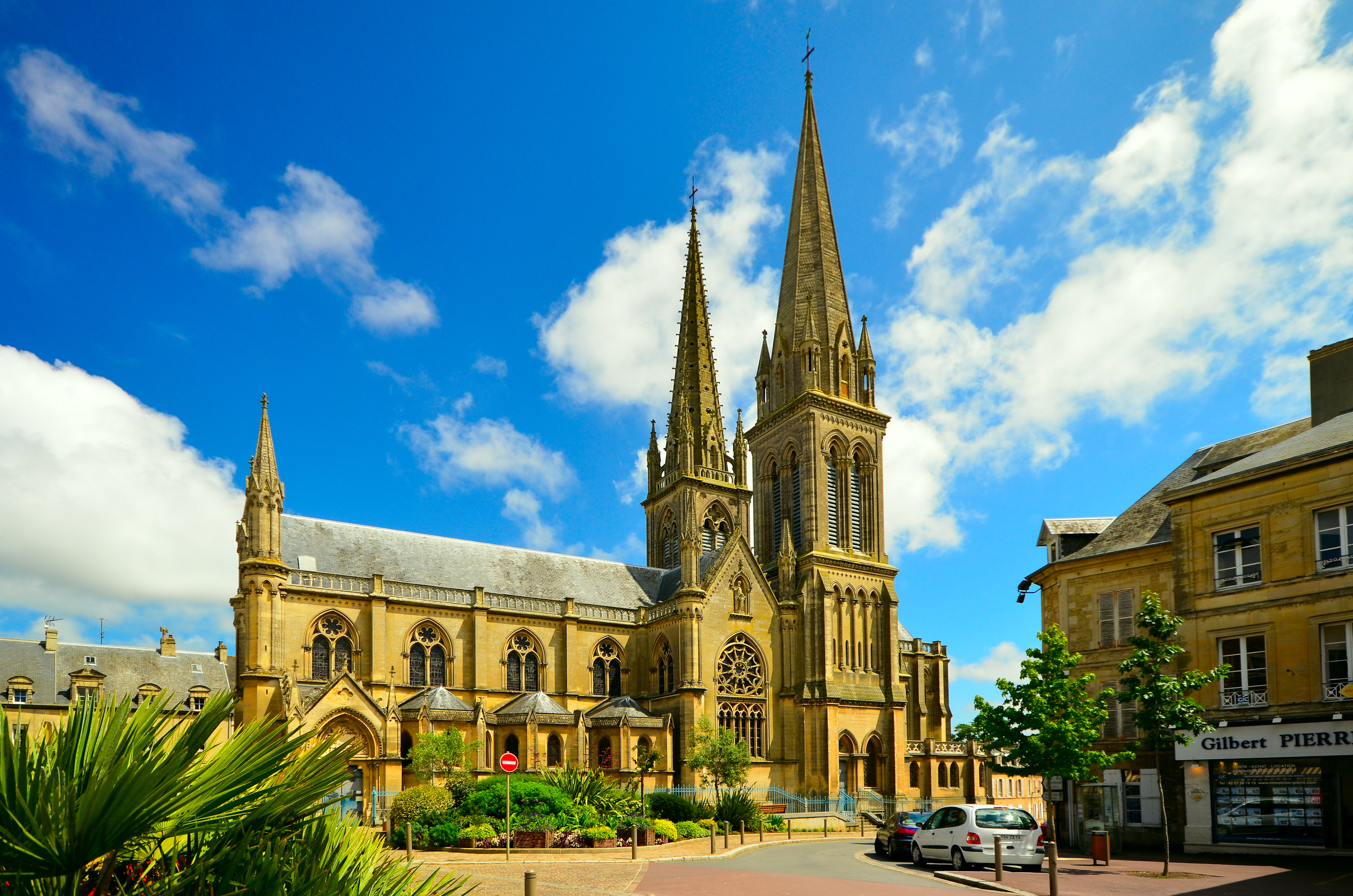
- The church of Notre-Dame de la Délivrande in Douvres-la-Délivrande

- Coat of arms
- Location of Douvres-la-Délivrande
- Location within France Location within Normandy
- Coordinates: 49°17′39″N 0°22′42″W
- Country: France
- Region: Normandy
- Department: Calvados
- Arrondissement: Caen
- Canton: Courseulles-sur-Mer
- Intercommunality: CC Cœur de Nacre

Government
  - Mayor (2020–2026): Thierry Lefort
- Area^{1}: 10.71 km^{2} (4.14 sq mi)
- Elevation: 19 m (62 ft)
- Highest elevation: 58 m (190 ft)
- Lowest elevation: 17 m (56 ft)
- Population (2023): 5,143
  - Density: 480.2/km^{2} (1,244/sq mi)
- Time zone: UTC+01:00 (CET)
  - Summer (DST): UTC+02:00 (CEST)
- INSEE/Postal code: 14228 /14440
- ^{1} French Land Register data, which excludes lakes, ponds, glaciers > 1 km^{2} (0.386 sq mi or 247 acres) and river estuaries.

Douvres-la-Délivrande (French pronunciation: [duvʁ la delivʁɑ̃d]) is a commune in the Calvados department in the Normandy region in northwestern France. The name was simply Douvres until 1961, when it was expanded to refer to the basilica Notre-Dame de la Délivrande ("Our Lady of Deliverance"), located in the town, a site of pilgrimage.

== History ==
=== World War II ===
During the Second World War, Douvres-la-Délivrande was the site of an important German air-detection radar installation, part of the strategic Atlantic Wall defences. Completed in the autumn of 1943, the station was split into two zones by the road from Douvres to Bény-sur-Mer; and heavily fortified with bunkers, machineguns and minefields.

The Northern zone held a large Siemens 'Wasserman' long-range radar and associated structures. The larger Southern zone had two intermediate-range Freya and two short-range Würzburg Riese radars; as well as command and infirmary bunkers, garages and artillery placements. Some 230 Luftwaffe personnel were based at the station, including electricians, engineers and 36 air controllers.

At 11 pm on the night of 5/6 June 1944, the Allies launched intensive jamming of radar frequencies which blinded the entire German radar network from Cherbourg to Le Havre. On the morning of the 6th (D-Day) the antennas at Douvres-la-Délivrande were rendered inoperative by Allied naval artillery bombardment.

Canadian troops who had landed nearby on 'Juno Beach' isolated the station but the Germans successfully defended it for 12 days, awaiting a counter-attack by Panzers; on one occasion it was resupplied with food via a nocturnal paradrop mission from Mont-de-Marsan.

On 17 June, a massive offensive by the British 41 Commando, Royal Marines - preceded by an artillery bombardment and supported by mine-clearing and anti-bunker tanks of 79th Armoured Division - secured the surrender of the garrison.

=== Present day ===
The radar site at Douvres-la-Délivrande is now home to a museum, with two of the bunkers housing displays about the evolution and role of radar. The museum also maintains a rare preserved example of the 'Würzburg' radar antenna.

The commune has a war cemetery with the graves of 1123 soldiers from both the Allied and Axis forces:

- 927 British
- 180 Germans
- 11 Canadians
- 3 Australians
- 1 Pole
- 1 unknown soldier

== Population ==
Historical population
Year	Pop.	±% p.a.
1968	1,916	—
1975	2,356	+3.00%
1982	2,877	+2.90%
1990	3,983	+4.15%
1999	4,809	+2.12%
2007	4,884	+0.19%
2012	5,072	+0.76%
2017	5,062	−0.04%
2023	5,143	+0.26%
Source: INSEE

== International relations ==
The commune is twinned with:

- Oerlenbach, Germany, since 2003
- (United Kingdom) Axminster, UK, since 1999

== See also ==
- Communes of the Calvados department
