= Vicques =

Vicques may refer to the following places:

- Vicques, Switzerland, in the canton of Jura
  - site of the Jura Observatory
- Vicques, Calvados, in France
