= Les Loges-Saulces =

- Commune
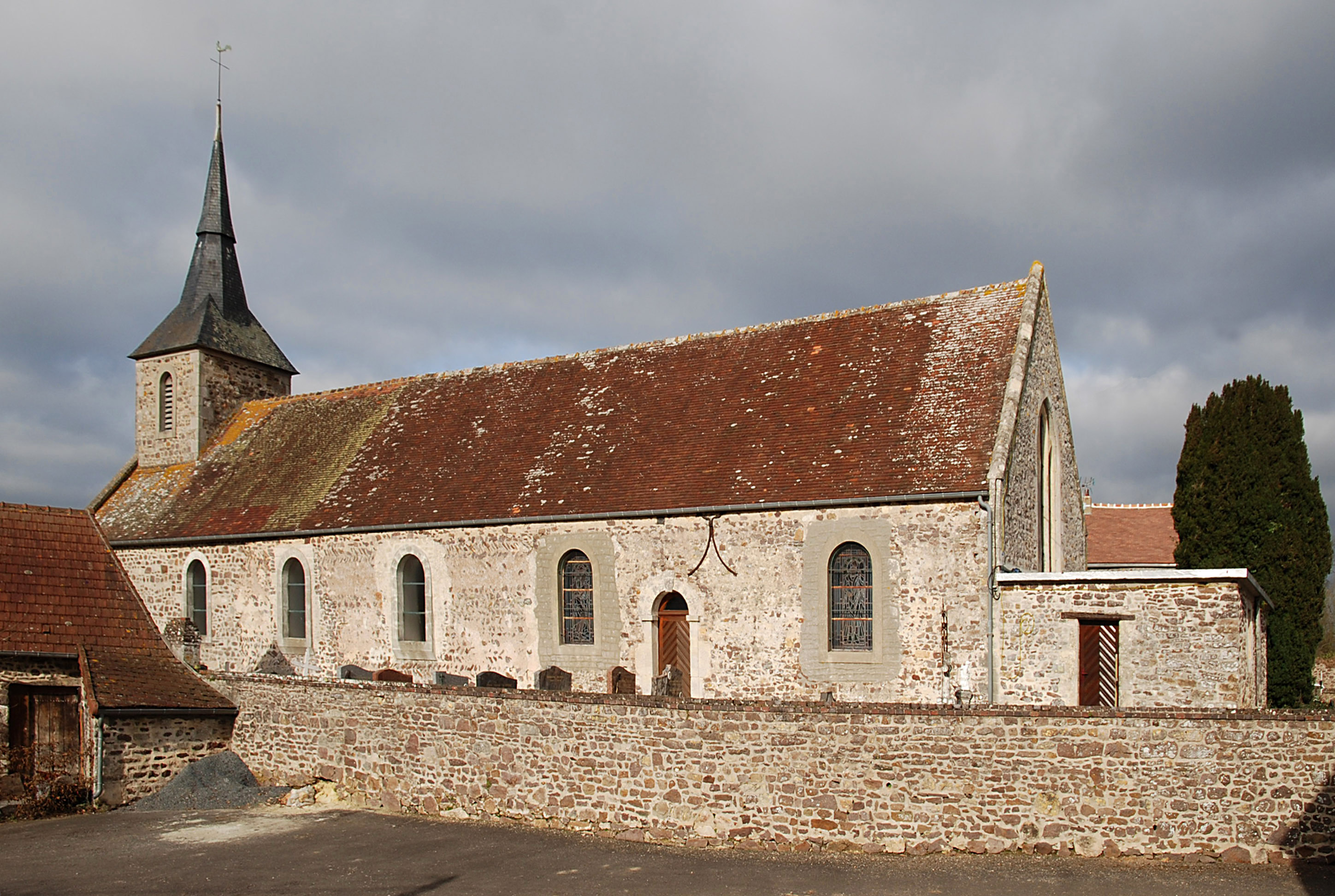
- The church in Les Loges-Saulces
- Location of Les Loges-Saulces
- Location within France Location within Normandy
- Coordinates: 48°51′59″N 0°17′54″W
- Country: France
- Region: Normandy
- Department: Calvados
- Arrondissement: Caen
- Canton: Falaise
- Intercommunality: Pays de Falaise

Government
  - Mayor (2020–2026): Fabien Dufay
- Area^{1}: 6.74 km^{2} (2.60 sq mi)
- Elevation: 200 m (660 ft)
- Highest elevation: 241 m (791 ft)
- Lowest elevation: 105 m (344 ft)
- Population (2023): 156
  - Density: 23.1/km^{2} (59.9/sq mi)
- Time zone: UTC+01:00 (CET)
  - Summer (DST): UTC+02:00 (CEST)
- INSEE/Postal code: 14375 /14700
- ^{1} French Land Register data, which excludes lakes, ponds, glaciers > 1 km^{2} (0.386 sq mi or 247 acres) and river estuaries.

Les Loges-Saulces (French pronunciation: [le lɔʒ sols]) is a commune in the Calvados department in the Normandy region in northwestern France.

== Geography ==
The commune of Les Loges-Saulces is part of the area known as Suisse Normande.

The commune is made up of the following collection of villages and hamlets, Les Loges-Saulces and Aizier.

The river Baize runs through the commune, along with one of its tributaries, Ruisseau du Val Lienard.

== Population ==
Historical population
Year	Pop.	±% p.a.
1968	136	—
1975	104	−3.76%
1982	106	+0.27%
1990	109	+0.35%
1999	119	+0.98%
2007	147	+2.68%
2012	176	+3.67%
2017	170	−0.69%
2023	156	−1.42%
Source: INSEE

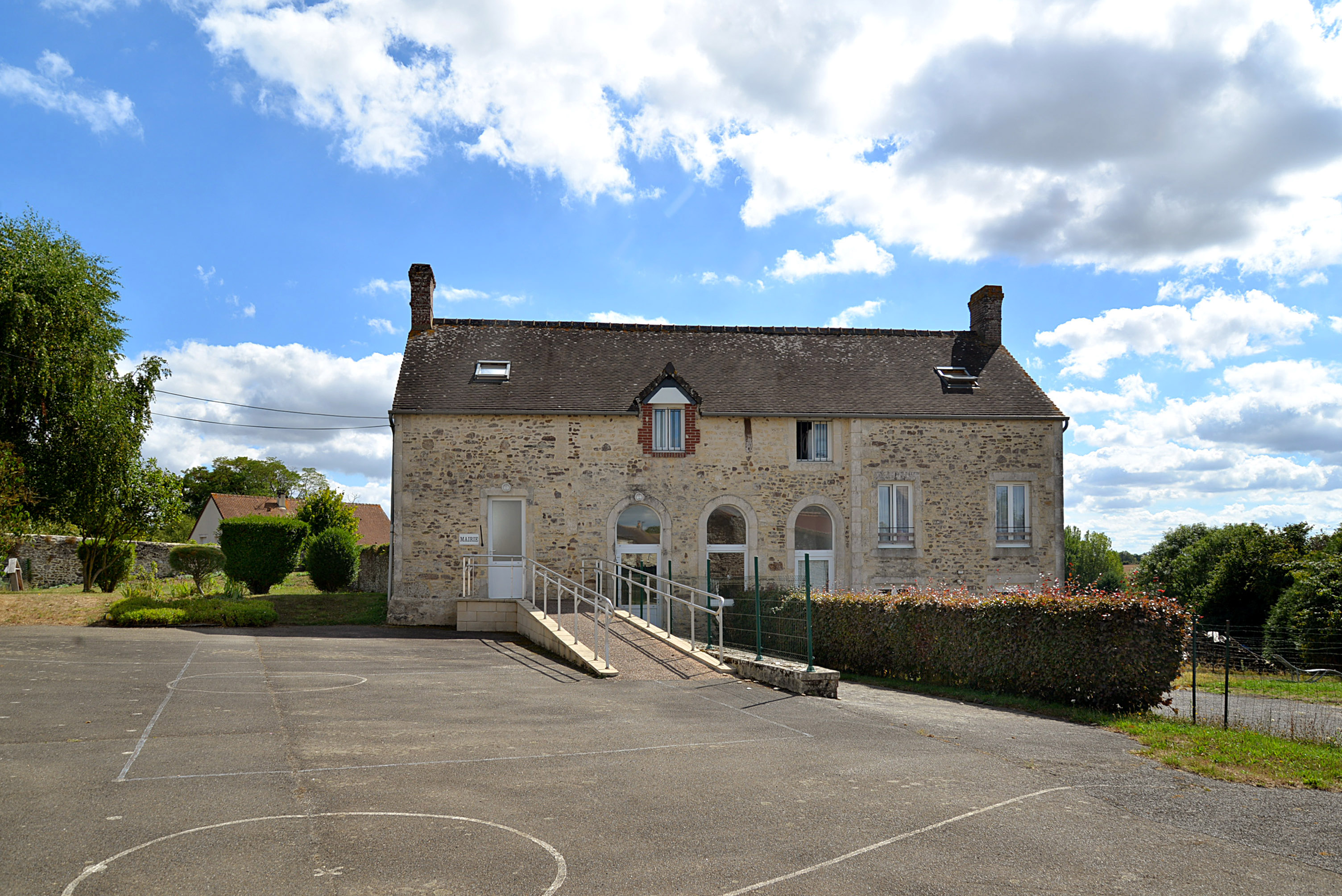
Mayors office of Loges-Saulces

== See also ==
- Communes of the Calvados department
