= Vignats =

- Commune
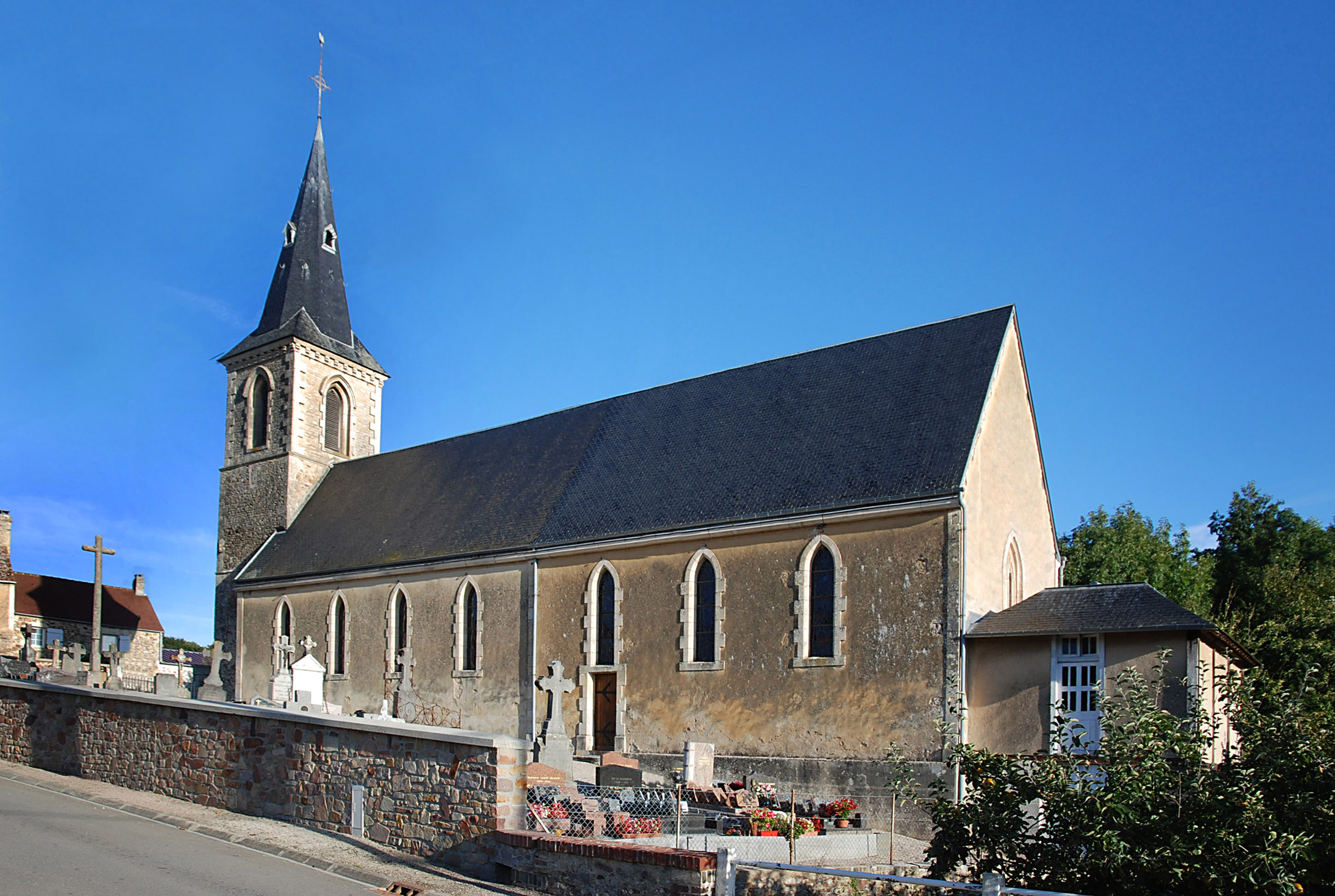
- The church in Vignats

- Coat of arms
- Location of Vignats
- Location within France Location within Normandy
- Coordinates: 48°51′19″N 0°06′09″W
- Country: France
- Region: Normandy
- Department: Calvados
- Arrondissement: Caen
- Canton: Falaise
- Intercommunality: Pays de Falaise

Government
  - Mayor (2020–2026): Kévin Dewaële
- Area^{1}: 8.80 km^{2} (3.40 sq mi)
- Elevation: 129 m (423 ft)
- Highest elevation: 175 m (574 ft)
- Lowest elevation: 86 m (282 ft)
- Population (2023): 284
  - Density: 32.3/km^{2} (83.6/sq mi)
- Time zone: UTC+01:00 (CET)
  - Summer (DST): UTC+02:00 (CEST)
- INSEE/Postal code: 14751 /14700
- ^{1} French Land Register data, which excludes lakes, ponds, glaciers > 1 km^{2} (0.386 sq mi or 247 acres) and river estuaries.

Vignats (French pronunciation: [viɲa]) is a commune in the Calvados department in the Normandy region in northwestern France. It has a population of approximately 300 residents, The commune is part of the Pays de Falaise intercommunal cooperative, which includes 57 other municipalities.

== Geography ==
The commune is made up of the following collection of villages and hamlets, La Rue d'Ave, Saint-Nicolas, L'Abbaye and Vignats. The commune borders the Orne department.

La Filaine and La Gronde rivers flow through the commune, plus a stream the Monceaux.

== Population ==
Historical population
Year	Pop.	±% p.a.
1968	299	—
1975	266	−1.66%
1982	249	−0.94%
1990	206	−2.34%
1999	224	+0.94%
2007	247	+1.23%
2012	285	+2.90%
2017	289	+0.28%
2023	284	−0.29%
Source: INSEE

== Climate ==
The climate that characterizes the municipality is classified, in 2010, as "altered oceanic climate" according to the classification of climates in France, which at that time had eight major climate types in mainland France. In 2020, the municipality still falls under the same type of climate in the classification established by Météo-France, which now includes only five major climate types in mainland France. It is a transitional zone between oceanic climate, mountain climate, and semi-continental climate. The temperature differences between winter and summer increase with the distance from the sea. Rainfall is lower than along the coast, except in the vicinity of mountainous areas.

== See also ==
- Communes of the Calvados department
