= Fourches =

- Commune
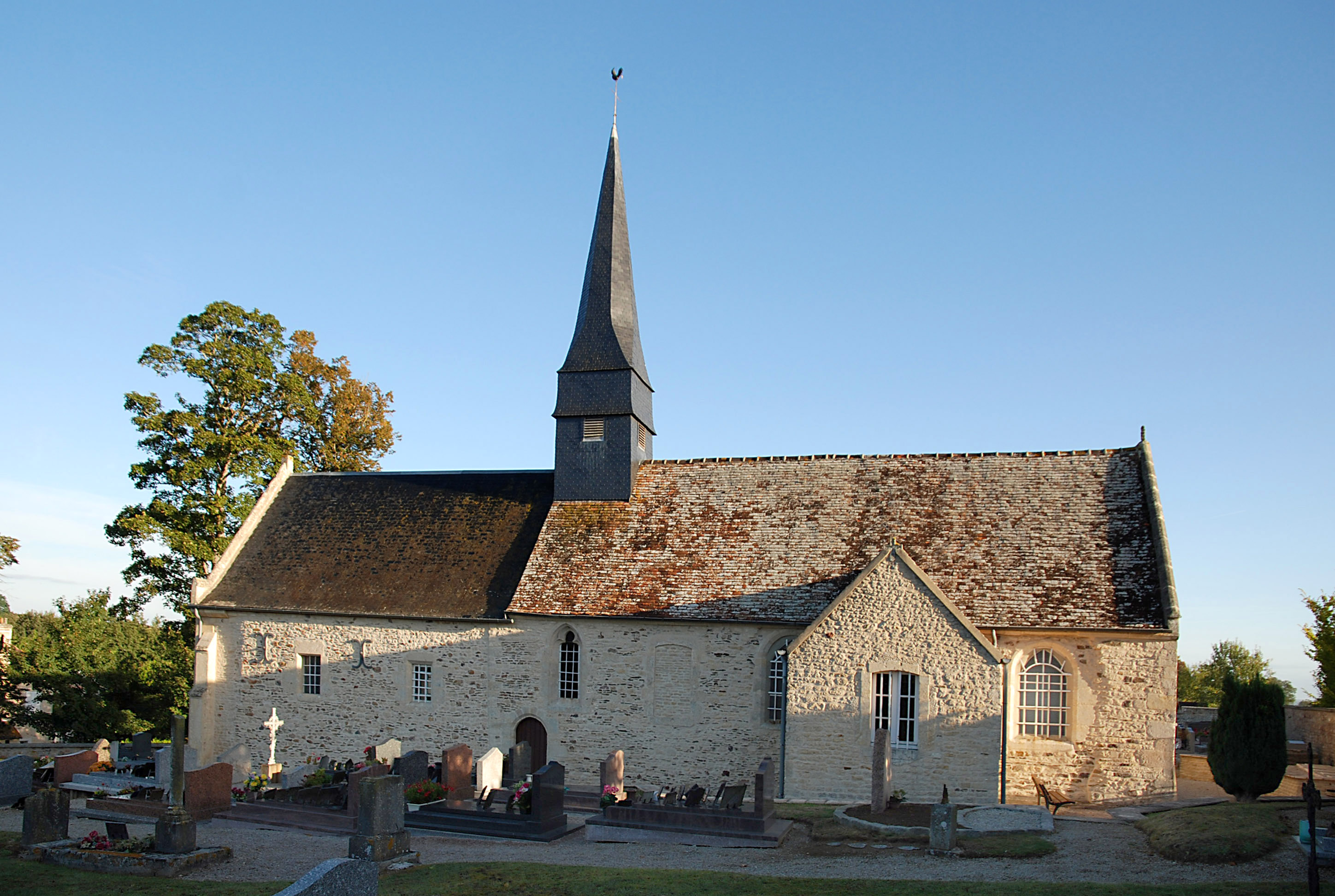
- The church in Fourches
- Location of Fourches
- Location within France Location within Normandy
- Coordinates: 48°51′43″N 0°04′43″W
- Country: France
- Region: Normandy
- Department: Calvados
- Arrondissement: Caen
- Canton: Falaise
- Intercommunality: Pays de Falaise

Government
  - Mayor (2020–2026): Éric Leroy
- Area^{1}: 4.78 km^{2} (1.85 sq mi)
- Highest elevation: 160 m (520 ft)
- Lowest elevation: 73 m (240 ft)
- Population (2023): 215
  - Density: 45.0/km^{2} (116/sq mi)
- Time zone: UTC+01:00 (CET)
  - Summer (DST): UTC+02:00 (CEST)
- INSEE/Postal code: 14283 /14620
- ^{1} French Land Register data, which excludes lakes, ponds, glaciers > 1 km^{2} (0.386 sq mi or 247 acres) and river estuaries.

Fourches (French pronunciation: [fuʁʃ]) is a commune in the Calvados department in the Normandy region in northwestern France.

== Geography ==
The Filaine river is the only watercourse running through the commune.

The commune borders the Orne department.

== Population ==
Historical population
| Year | Pop. | ±% p.a. |
|---|---|---|
| 1968 | 170 | — |
| 1975 | 156 | −1.22% |
| 1982 | 166 | +0.89% |
| 1990 | 147 | −1.51% |
| 1999 | 151 | +0.30% |
| 2007 | 161 | +0.80% |
| 2012 | 226 | +7.02% |
| 2017 | 231 | +0.44% |
| 2023 | 215 | −1.19% |
Source: INSEE

== See also ==
- Communes of the Calvados department
