= Ussy =

- Commune
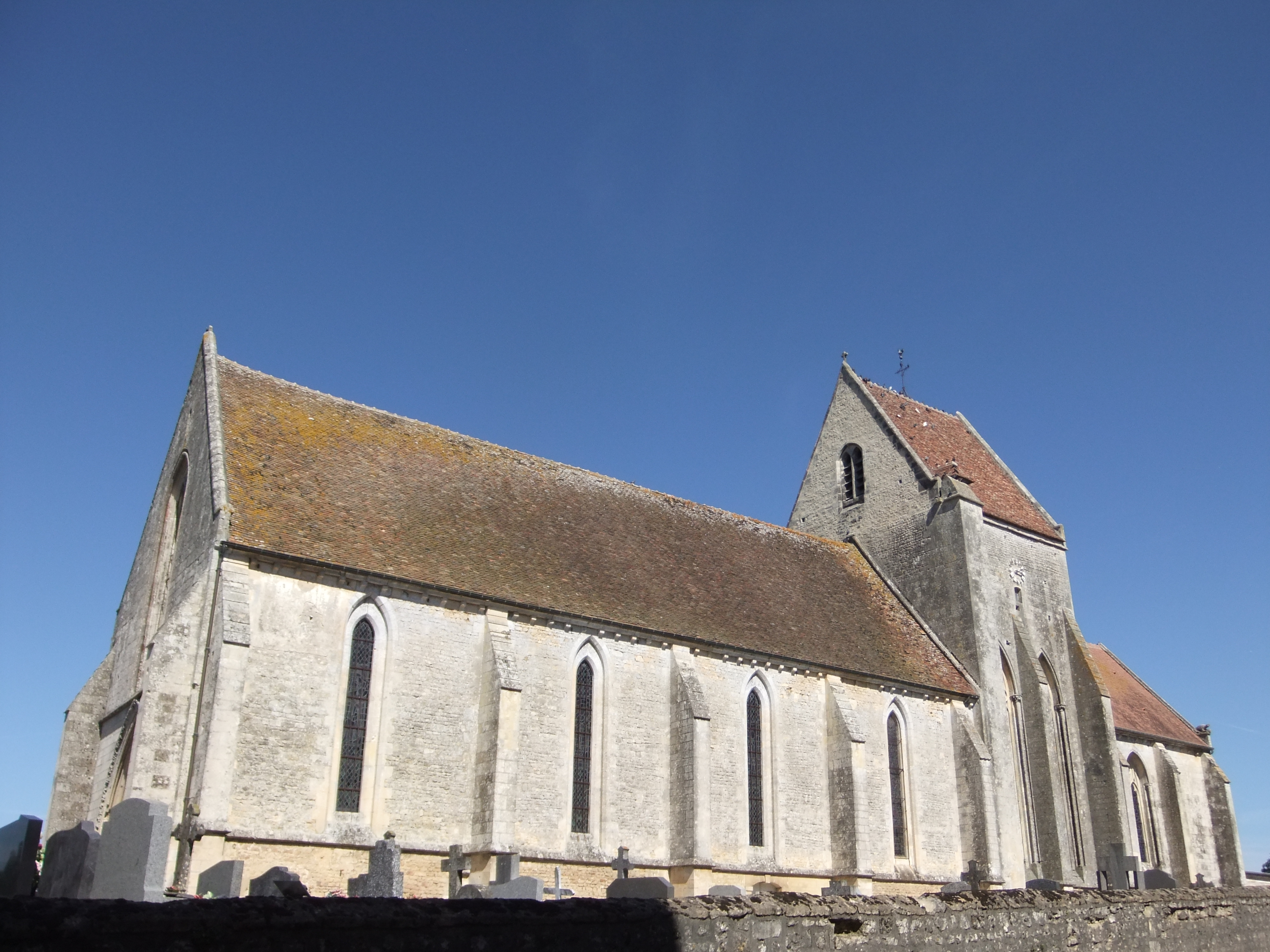
- The church in Ussy
- Location of Ussy
- Location within France Location within Normandy
- Coordinates: 48°56′53″N 0°16′55″W
- Country: France
- Region: Normandy
- Department: Calvados
- Arrondissement: Caen
- Canton: Falaise
- Intercommunality: Pays de Falaise

Government
  - Mayor (2020–2026): Eric Delile
- Area^{1}: 8.68 km^{2} (3.35 sq mi)
- Elevation: 178 m (584 ft)
- Highest elevation: 200 m (660 ft)
- Lowest elevation: 124 m (407 ft)
- Population (2023): 869
  - Density: 100/km^{2} (259/sq mi)
- Time zone: UTC+01:00 (CET)
  - Summer (DST): UTC+02:00 (CEST)
- INSEE/Postal code: 14720 /14420
- ^{1} French Land Register data, which excludes lakes, ponds, glaciers > 1 km^{2} (0.386 sq mi or 247 acres) and river estuaries.

Ussy (French pronunciation: [ysi]) is a commune in the Calvados department in the Normandy region in northwestern France.

== Geography ==
The commune is made up of the following collection of villages and hamlets, La Chesnaie, Le Marais, Ussy, La Baronnie, Le Haut du Pôt and Le Pôt.

The river Laizon flows through the commune. in addition three streams also flow through the commune, the Grand Etang, the Moussaye and the Leffard.

== Population ==
Historical population
Year	Pop.	±% p.a.
1968	677	—
1975	638	−0.84%
1982	627	−0.25%
1990	717	+1.69%
1999	755	+0.58%
2007	847	+1.45%
2012	858	+0.26%
2017	872	+0.32%
2023	869	−0.06%
Source: INSEE

== Points of Interest ==
=== National Heritage sites ===
The Commune has three buildings and areas listed as a Monument historique

- Église Saint-Martin a thirteenth century church that was listed as a monument in 1913.
- La Pierre du Pot a Neolithic Menhir and was listed in 1945.
- Pierre de la Hoberie a Neolithic Menhir and was listed in 1945.

== See also ==
- Communes of the Calvados department
