= Fourneaux-le-Val =

- Commune
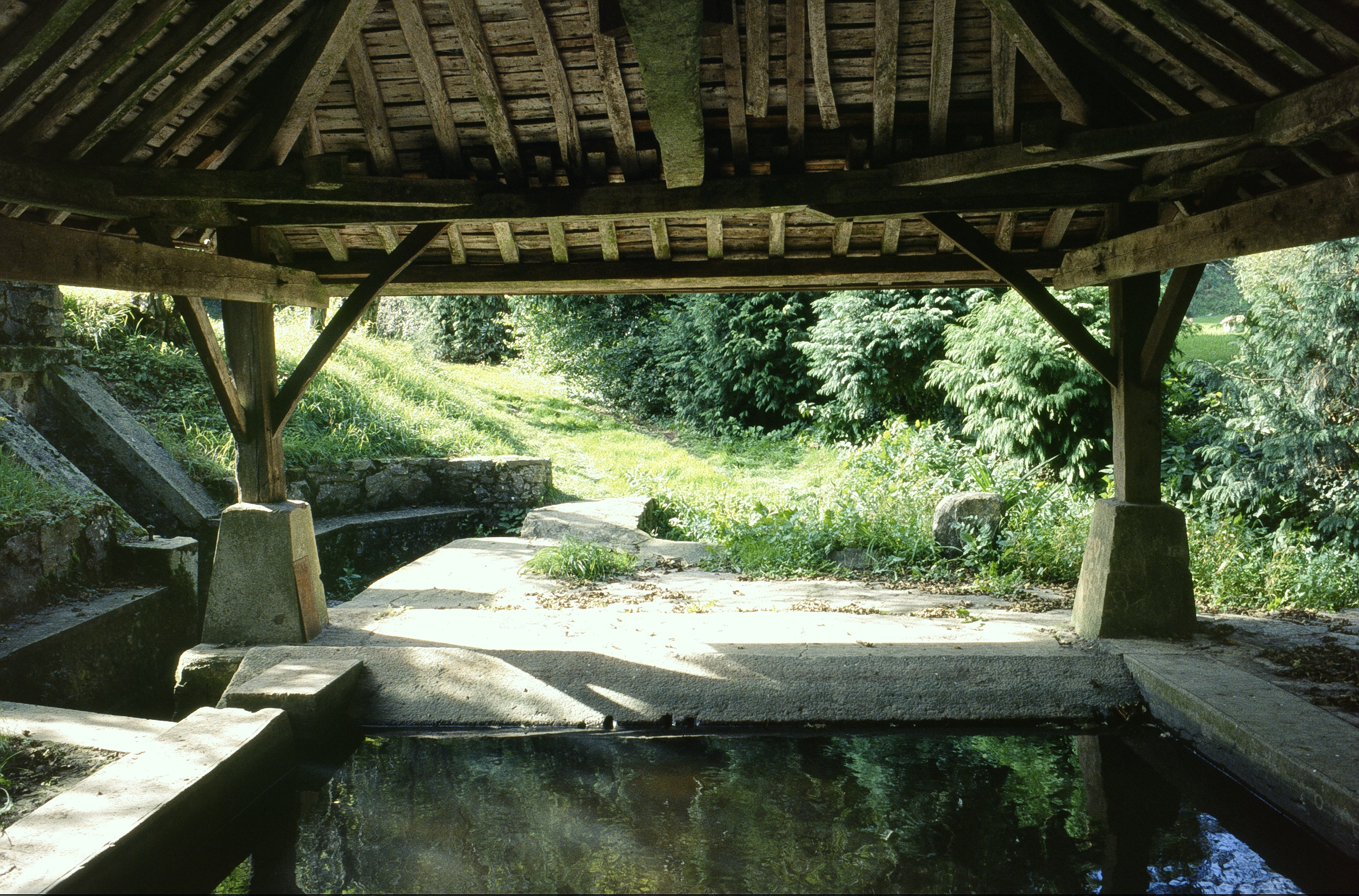
- The public washhouse of Le Val Besnet
- Location of Fourneaux-le-Val
- Location within France Location within Normandy
- Coordinates: 48°51′20″N 0°15′55″W
- Country: France
- Region: Normandy
- Department: Calvados
- Arrondissement: Caen
- Canton: Falaise
- Intercommunality: Pays de Falaise

Government
  - Mayor (2023–2026): Sabrina Catherine
- Area^{1}: 5.39 km^{2} (2.08 sq mi)
- Elevation: 180 m (590 ft)
- Highest elevation: 241 m (791 ft)
- Lowest elevation: 122 m (400 ft)
- Population (2023): 155
  - Density: 28.8/km^{2} (74.5/sq mi)
- Time zone: UTC+01:00 (CET)
  - Summer (DST): UTC+02:00 (CEST)
- INSEE/Postal code: 14284 /14700
- ^{1} French Land Register data, which excludes lakes, ponds, glaciers > 1 km^{2} (0.386 sq mi or 247 acres) and river estuaries.

Fourneaux-le-Val (French pronunciation: [fuʁno lə val]) is a commune in the Calvados department in the Normandy region in northwestern France.

== Geography ==
The commune of Fourneaux-le-Val is part of the area known as Suisse Normande.

The commune is made up of the following collection of villages and hamlets, Fourneaux-le-Val, Le Bois Groult and La Hunaudière.

The river Baize runs through the commune, along with two of its tributaries, Ruisseau des Vaux Viets and Ruisseau du Val Lienard.

== Notable buildings and places ==
- The Lavoir at Val Besnet is listed in the General inventory of cultural heritage.
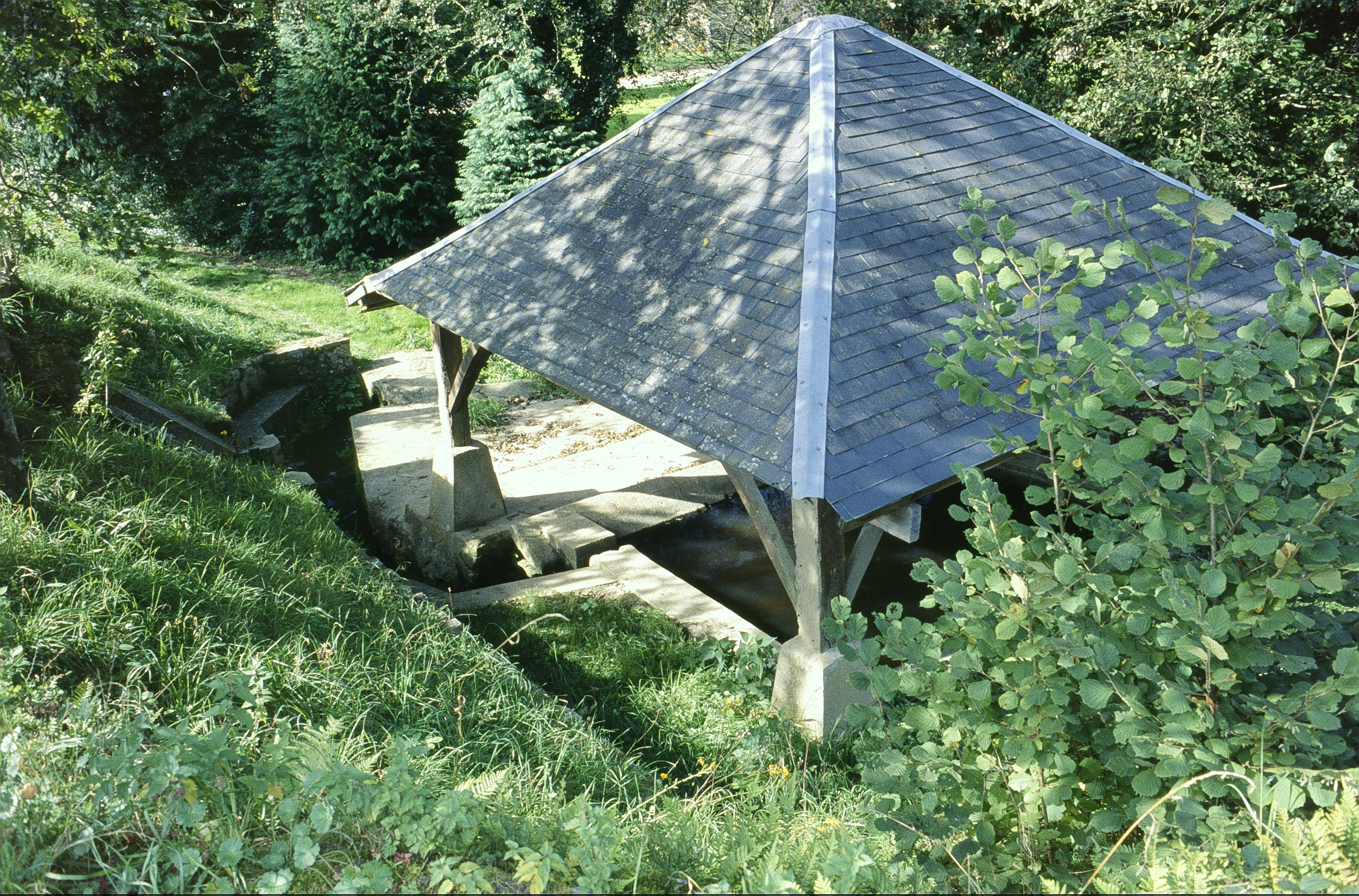
Lavoir of val Besnet

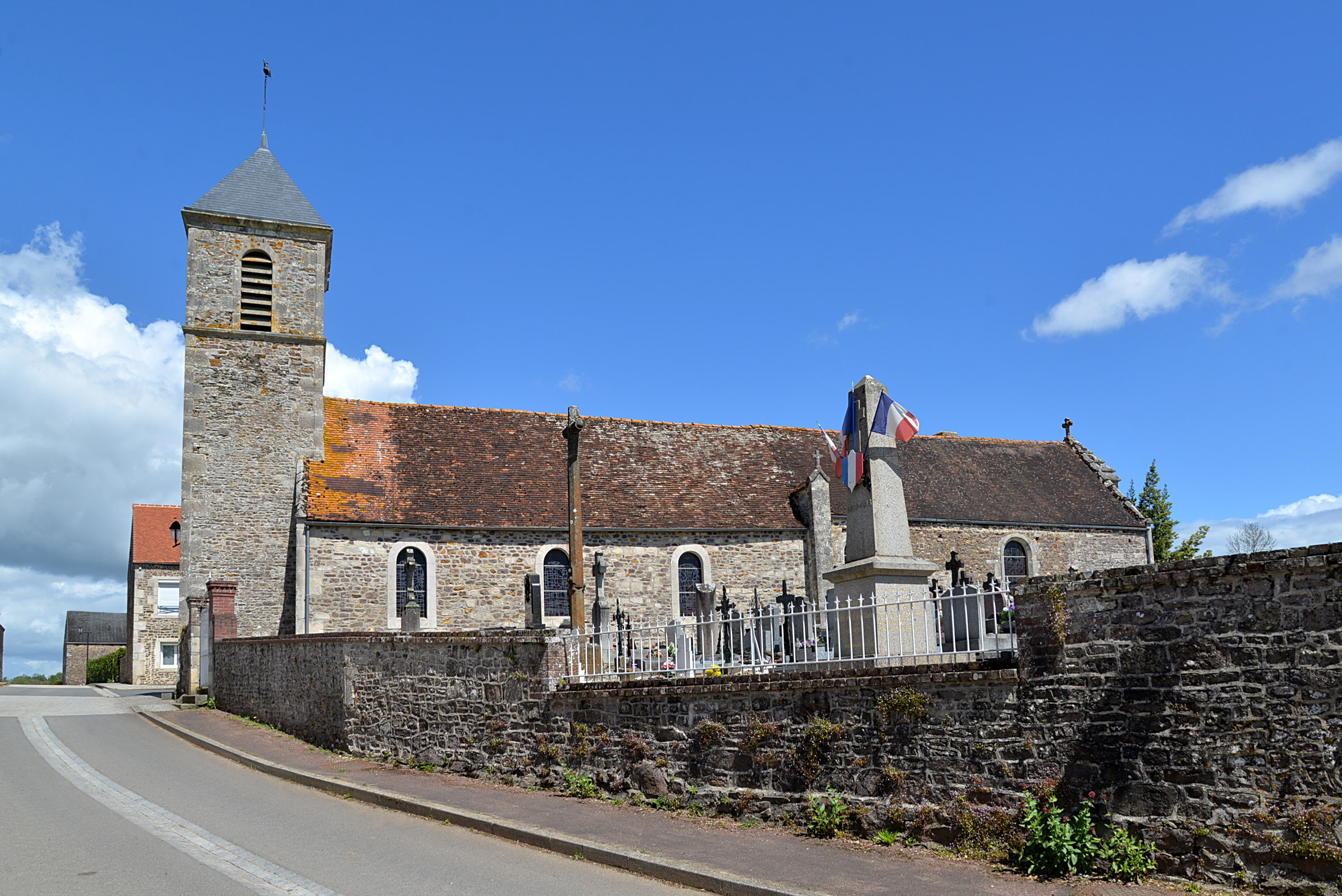
Church of Saint-Pierre de Fourneaux-le-Val

== Population ==
Historical population
Year	Pop.	±% p.a.
1968	149	—
1975	138	−1.09%
1982	157	+1.86%
1990	183	+1.93%
1999	175	−0.50%
2007	181	+0.42%
2012	170	−1.25%
2017	158	−1.45%
2023	155	−0.32%
Source: INSEE

== See also ==
- Communes of the Calvados department
