= Crocy =

- Commune
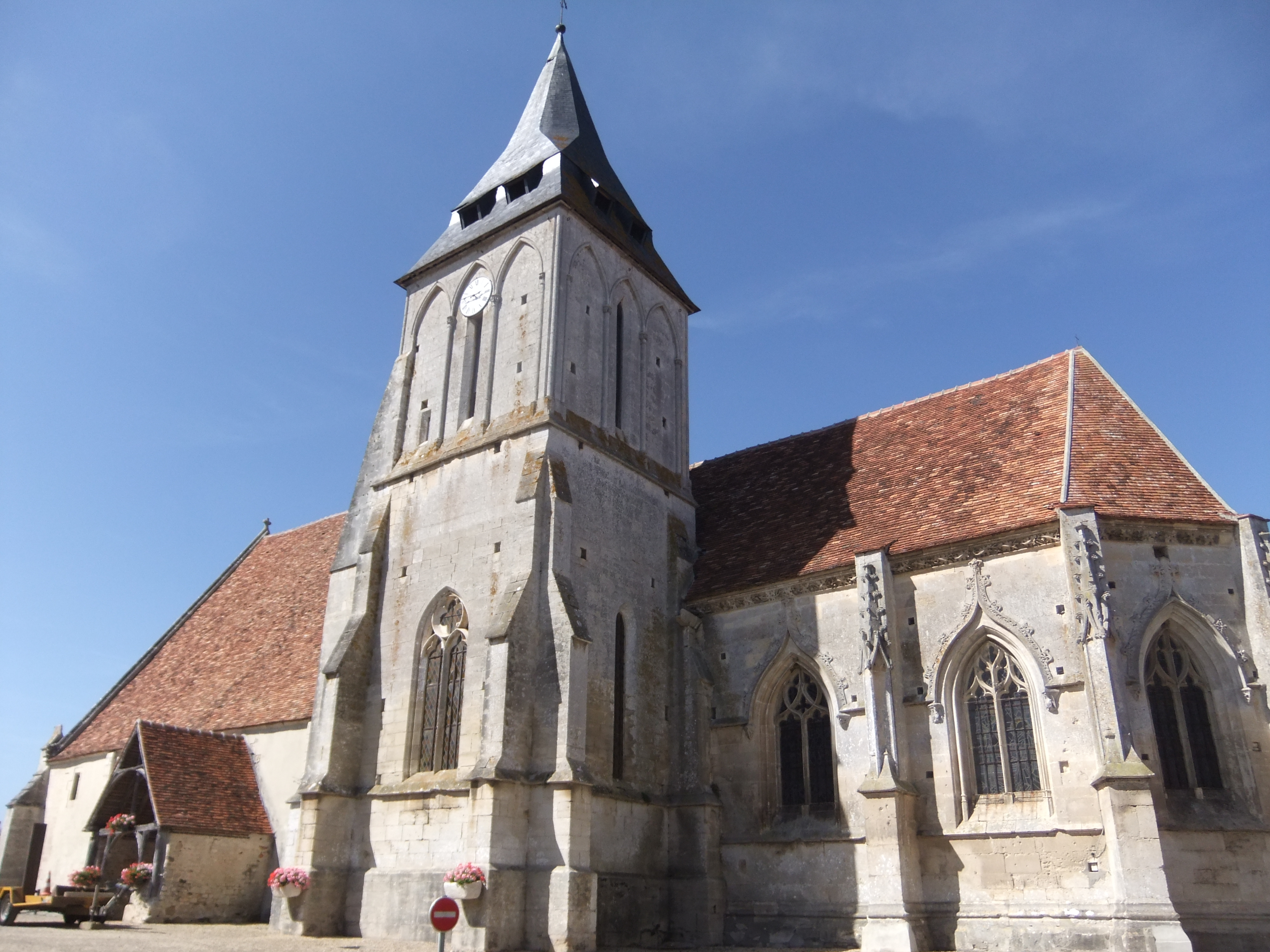
- The church in Crocy
- Location of Crocy
- Location within France Location within Normandy
- Coordinates: 48°52′51″N 0°03′51″W
- Country: France
- Region: Normandy
- Department: Calvados
- Arrondissement: Caen
- Canton: Falaise
- Intercommunality: Pays de Falaise

Government
  - Mayor (2020–2026): Edouard Reussner
- Area^{1}: 10.07 km^{2} (3.89 sq mi)
- Elevation: 110 m (360 ft)
- Highest elevation: 106 m (348 ft)
- Lowest elevation: 56 m (184 ft)
- Population (2023): 285
  - Density: 28.3/km^{2} (73.3/sq mi)
- Time zone: UTC+01:00 (CET)
  - Summer (DST): UTC+02:00 (CEST)
- INSEE/Postal code: 14206 /14620
- ^{1} French Land Register data, which excludes lakes, ponds, glaciers > 1 km^{2} (0.386 sq mi or 247 acres) and river estuaries.

Crocy (French pronunciation: [kʁɔsi]) is a commune in the Calvados department and Normandy region of north-western France. It is situated close to Falaise.

The name is believed to derive from the Gallo-Roman personal name Crossius.

== Geography ==
The commune is made up of the following collection of villages and hamlets, Les Cordiers, Le Coisel, La Croix Potier, Le Manoir, Vitreseul and Crocy. The commune borders the Orne department.

Three rivers run through the commune: the Dives, Filaine and Gronde.

== Population ==
Historical population
| Year | Pop. | ±% p.a. |
|---|---|---|
| 1968 | 311 | — |
| 1975 | 311 | +0.00% |
| 1982 | 305 | −0.28% |
| 1990 | 304 | −0.04% |
| 1999 | 289 | −0.56% |
| 2007 | 291 | +0.09% |
| 2012 | 301 | +0.68% |
| 2017 | 311 | +0.66% |
| 2023 | 285 | −1.44% |
Source: INSEE

== Points of Interest ==
- Eglise Saint-Hilaire - is a church built in the 12th century which was listed as a Monument historique in 1927.

== See also ==
- Communes of the Calvados department
