= Maizières, Calvados =

Maizières
- Commune
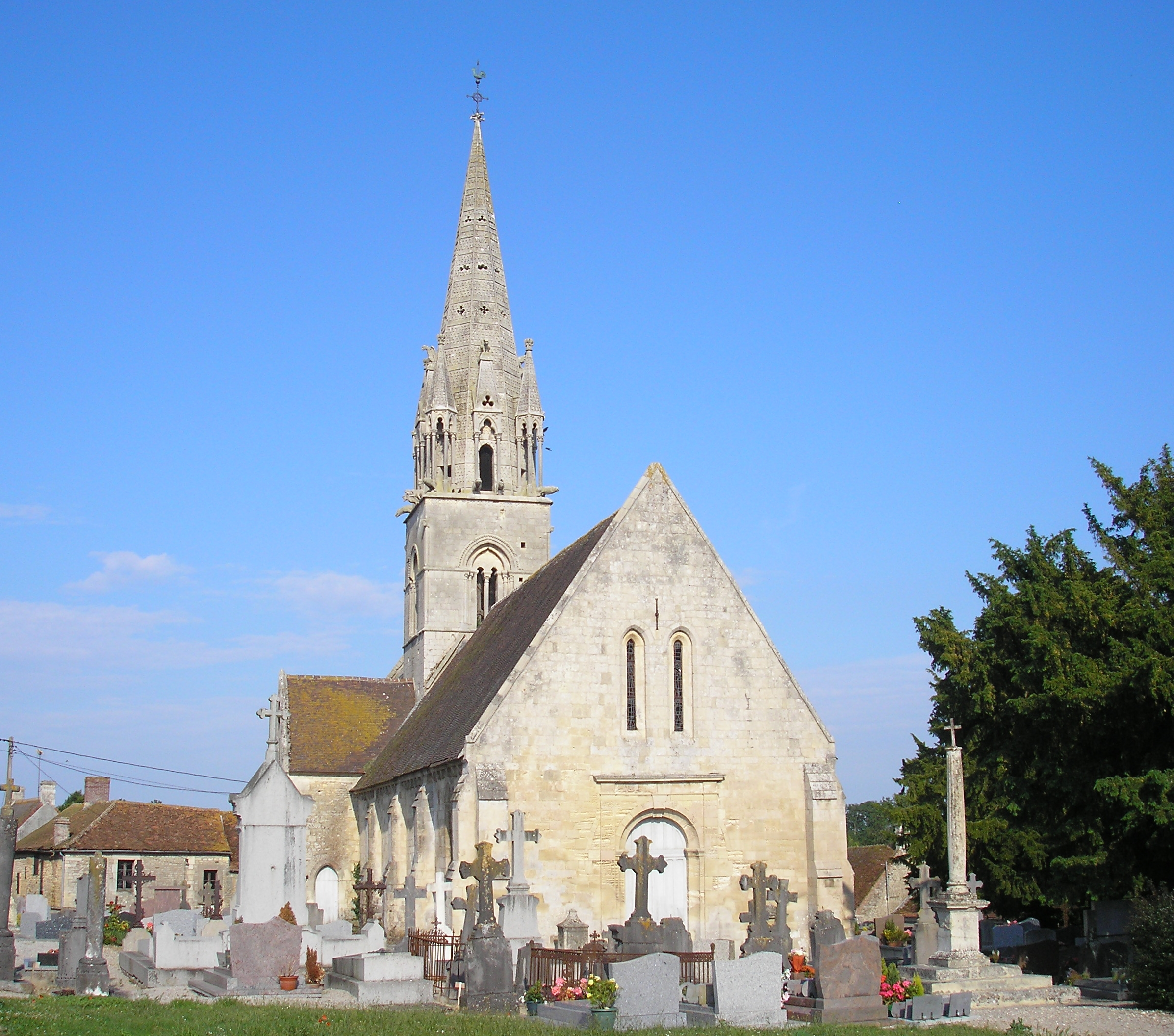
- The church in Maizières

- Coat of arms
- Location of Maizières
- Location within France Location within Normandy
- Coordinates: 49°01′02″N 0°09′25″W
- Country: France
- Region: Normandy
- Department: Calvados
- Arrondissement: Caen
- Canton: Falaise
- Intercommunality: Pays de Falaise

Government
  - Mayor (2020–2026): Tony Alimeck
- Area^{1}: 7.15 km^{2} (2.76 sq mi)
- Elevation: 100 m (330 ft)
- Highest elevation: 105 m (344 ft)
- Lowest elevation: 43 m (141 ft)
- Population (2023): 437
  - Density: 61.1/km^{2} (158/sq mi)
- Time zone: UTC+01:00 (CET)
  - Summer (DST): UTC+02:00 (CEST)
- INSEE/Postal code: 14394 /14190
- ^{1} French Land Register data, which excludes lakes, ponds, glaciers > 1 km^{2} (0.386 sq mi or 247 acres) and river estuaries.

Maizières (French pronunciation: [mɛzjɛʁ]) is a commune in the Calvados department in the Normandy region in northwestern France.

== Geography ==
A single watercourse, the river Laizon flows through the commune.

== Population ==
Historical population
| Year | Pop. | ±% p.a. |
|---|---|---|
| 1968 | 298 | — |
| 1975 | 328 | +1.38% |
| 1982 | 408 | +3.17% |
| 1990 | 437 | +0.86% |
| 1999 | 422 | −0.39% |
| 2007 | 429 | +0.21% |
| 2012 | 452 | +1.05% |
| 2017 | 444 | −0.36% |
| 2023 | 437 | −0.26% |
Source: INSEE

== Points of Interest ==
=== National heritage sites ===
- Église Saint-Pierre de Maizières - a thirteenth century church registered as a Monument historique in 1862.

== See also ==
- Communes of the Calvados department
