= Pertheville-Ners =

- Commune
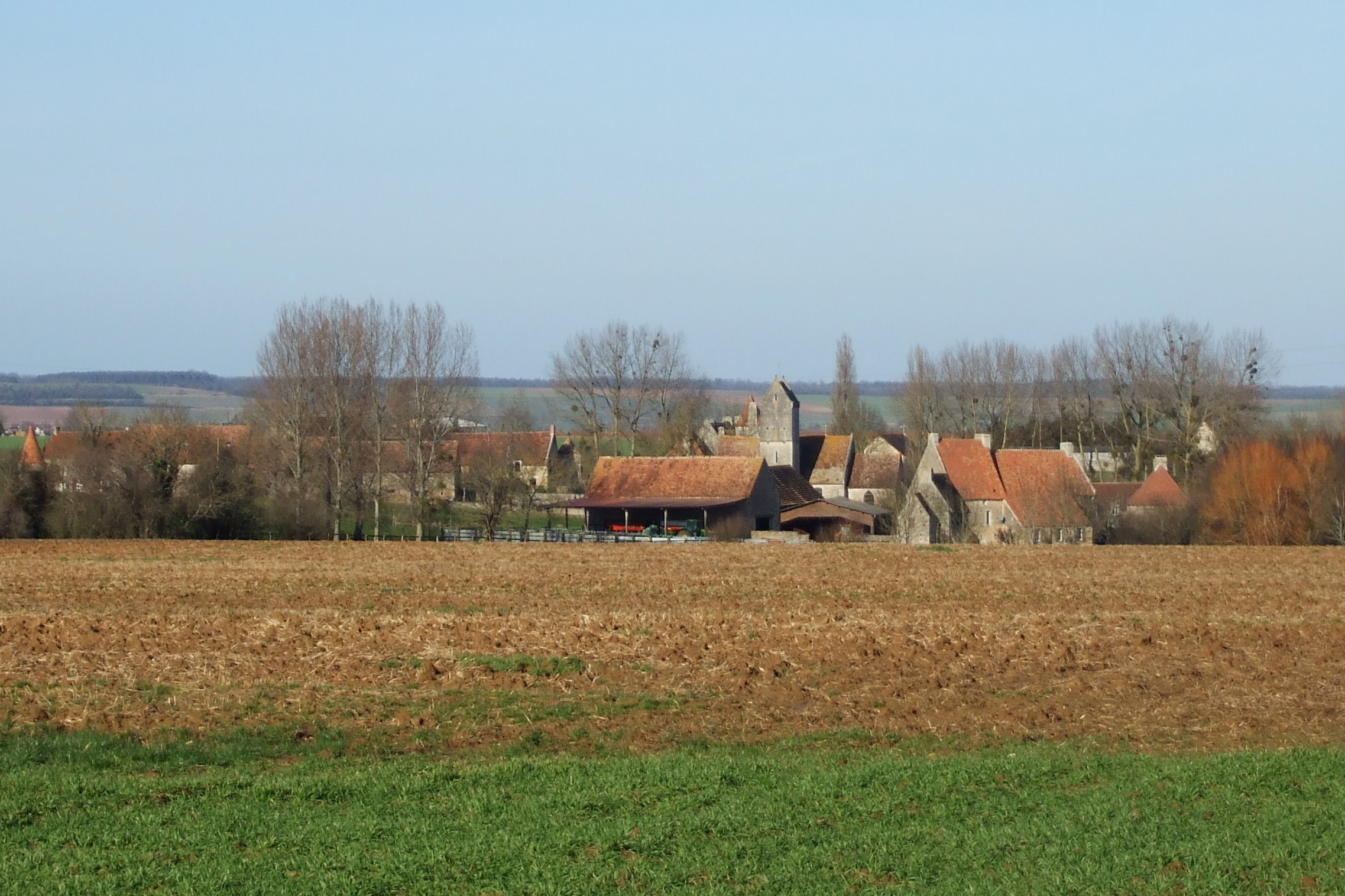
- A general view of Pertheville-Ners
- Location of Pertheville-Ners
- Location within France Location within Normandy
- Coordinates: 48°52′44″N 0°06′27″W
- Country: France
- Region: Normandy
- Department: Calvados
- Arrondissement: Caen
- Canton: Falaise
- Intercommunality: Pays de Falaise

Government
  - Mayor (2020–2026): Séverine Lepetit
- Area^{1}: 8.25 km^{2} (3.19 sq mi)
- Elevation: 119 m (390 ft)
- Highest elevation: 153 m (502 ft)
- Lowest elevation: 71 m (233 ft)
- Population (2023): 234
  - Density: 28.4/km^{2} (73.5/sq mi)
- Time zone: UTC+01:00 (CET)
  - Summer (DST): UTC+02:00 (CEST)
- INSEE/Postal code: 14498 /14700
- ^{1} French Land Register data, which excludes lakes, ponds, glaciers > 1 km^{2} (0.386 sq mi or 247 acres) and river estuaries.

Pertheville-Ners is a commune in the Calvados department in the Normandy region in northwestern France.

== Geography ==
The commune is made up of the following collection of villages and hamlets, Ners, Les Monceaux, L'Église and La Balanderie.

The Rivers Traine-feuilles and La Gronde run through the commune, plus a stream the Monceaux.

== History ==
The commune resulted from the fusion in 1858 of Pertheville (259 inhabitants in 1856) and Ners (113 inhabitants).

== Administration ==
The mayor from 1990 to March 2008 was Michel Mallet, a farmer, who was politically independent. The mayor from 2008 until 2014 was Joël Patard, a teacher, also an independent. The current mayor, elected in 2014 and 2020, is Séverine Lepetit.

List of mayors
Term	Name	Party	Profession
1990–2008	Michel Mallet	Ind.	Farmer
2008–2014	Joël Patard	Ind.	Teacher
2014–incumbent	Séverine Lepetit		

== Population ==
Historical population
Year	Pop.	±% p.a.
1968	191	—
1975	179	−0.92%
1982	197	+1.38%
1990	188	−0.58%
1999	209	+1.18%
2007	244	+1.95%
2012	250	+0.49%
2017	245	−0.40%
2023	234	−0.76%
Source: INSEE

== Sights ==
- The church of Saint-Aubin at Ners
- The church of Saint-Pierre at Pertheville
- The chateau
- The Manoir du Chêne Sec (Manor House of the Dry Oak)

== See also ==
- Communes of the Calvados department
