= Canton of Falaise =

Coordinates: 48.90°N 0.20°W

- Canton
- Situation of the canton of Falaise in the department of Calvados
- Country: France
- Region: Normandy
- Department: Calvados
- No. of communes: {{{nbcomm}}}
- Population (2023): 26,580
- INSEE code: 1413

The canton of Falaise is an administrative division of the Calvados department, northwestern France. It was created at the French canton reorganisation which came into effect in March 2015. Its seat is in Falaise.

It consists of the following communes:

1. Aubigny
2. Barou-en-Auge
3. Beaumais
4. Bernières-d'Ailly
5. Bonnœil
6. Bons-Tassilly
7. Cordey
8. Courcy
9. Crocy
10. Damblainville
11. Le Détroit
12. Épaney
13. Eraines
14. Ernes
15. Falaise
16. Fontaine-le-Pin
17. Fourches
18. Fourneaux-le-Val
19. Fresné-la-Mère
20. La Hoguette
21. Les Isles-Bardel
22. Jort
23. Leffard
24. Les Loges-Saulces
25. Louvagny
26. Maizières
27. Le Marais-la-Chapelle
28. Martigny-sur-l'Ante
29. Le Mesnil-Villement
30. Morteaux-Coulibœuf
31. Les Moutiers-en-Auge
32. Noron-l'Abbaye
33. Norrey-en-Auge
34. Olendon
35. Ouilly-le-Tesson
36. Perrières
37. Pertheville-Ners
38. Pierrefitte-en-Cinglais
39. Pierrepont
40. Pont-d'Ouilly
41. Potigny
42. Rapilly
43. Rouvres
44. Saint-Germain-Langot
45. Saint-Martin-de-Mieux
46. Saint-Pierre-Canivet
47. Saint-Pierre-du-Bû
48. Sassy
49. Soulangy
50. Soumont-Saint-Quentin
51. Tréprel
52. Ussy
53. Versainville
54. Vicques
55. Vignats
56. Villers-Canivet
57. Villy-lez-Falaise
