= Pierrepont, Calvados =

Pierrepont
- Commune
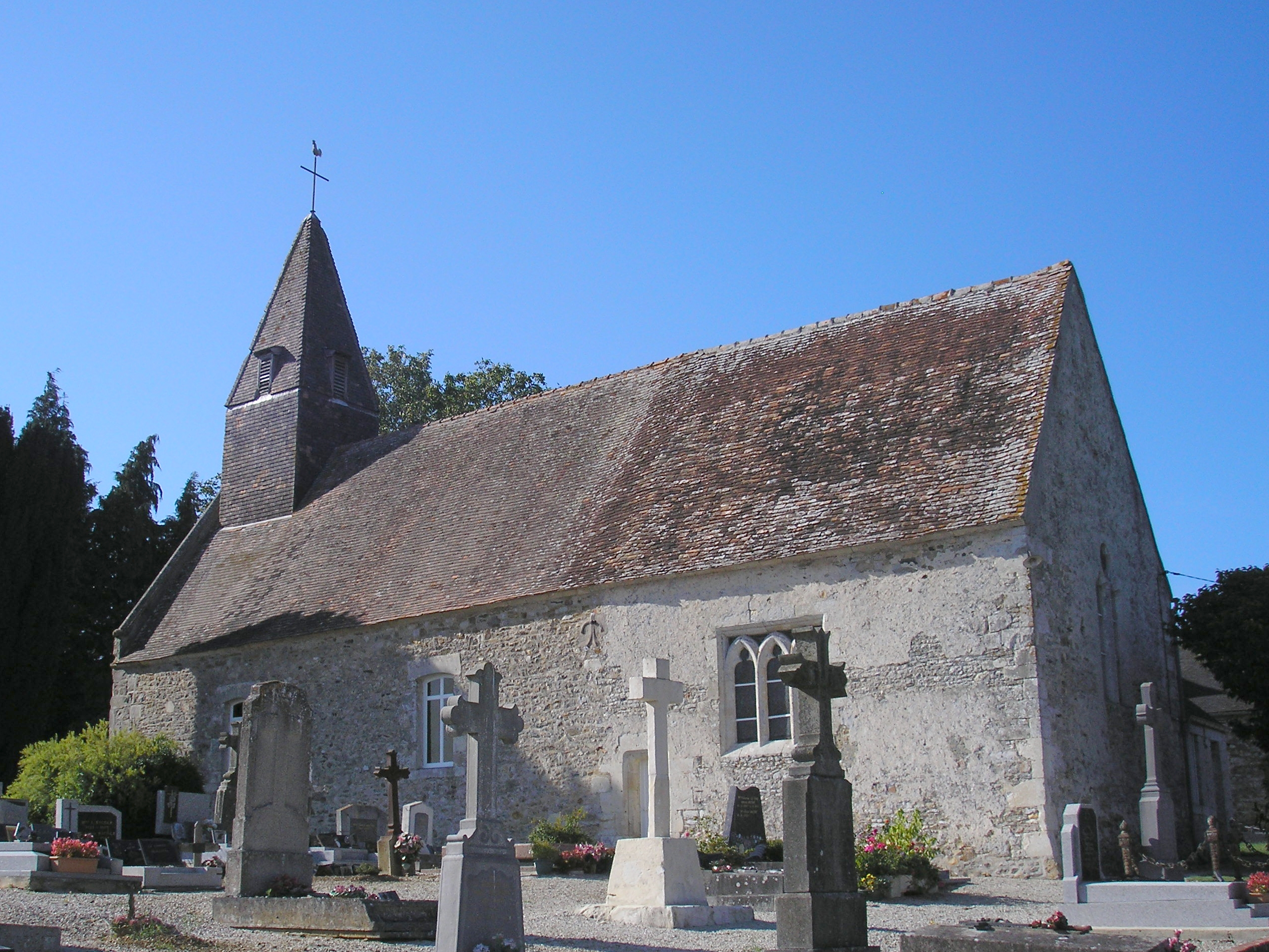
- The church in Pierrepont
- Location of Pierrepont
- Location within France Location within Normandy
- Coordinates: 48°52′53″N 0°19′17″W
- Country: France
- Region: Normandy
- Department: Calvados
- Arrondissement: Caen
- Canton: Falaise
- Intercommunality: Pays de Falaise

Government
  - Mayor (2020–2026): Jean-Jacques Lemercier
- Area^{1}: 4.29 km^{2} (1.66 sq mi)
- Elevation: 200 m (660 ft)
- Highest elevation: 240 m (790 ft)
- Lowest elevation: 135 m (443 ft)
- Population (2023): 83
  - Density: 19/km^{2} (50/sq mi)
- Time zone: UTC+01:00 (CET)
  - Summer (DST): UTC+02:00 (CEST)
- INSEE/Postal code: 14502 /14690
- ^{1} French Land Register data, which excludes lakes, ponds, glaciers > 1 km^{2} (0.386 sq mi or 247 acres) and river estuaries.

Pierrepont (French pronunciation: [pjɛʁpɔ̃]) is a commune in the Calvados department in the Normandy region in northwestern France.

== Geography ==
The commune is part of the area known as Suisse Normande.

The commune is made up of the following collection of villages and hamlets, Le Grand Clos, Le Mesnil Jacquet and Pierrepont.

The river Laize runs through the commune, along with the stream The Val d'Anis.

== Population ==
Historical population
Year	Pop.	±% p.a.
1968	112	—
1975	96	−2.18%
1982	89	−1.08%
1990	92	+0.42%
1999	87	−0.62%
2007	91	+0.56%
2012	93	+0.44%
2017	93	+0.00%
2023	83	−1.88%
Source: INSEE

== See also ==
- Communes of the Calvados department
