= Saint-Pierre-du-Bû =

- Commune
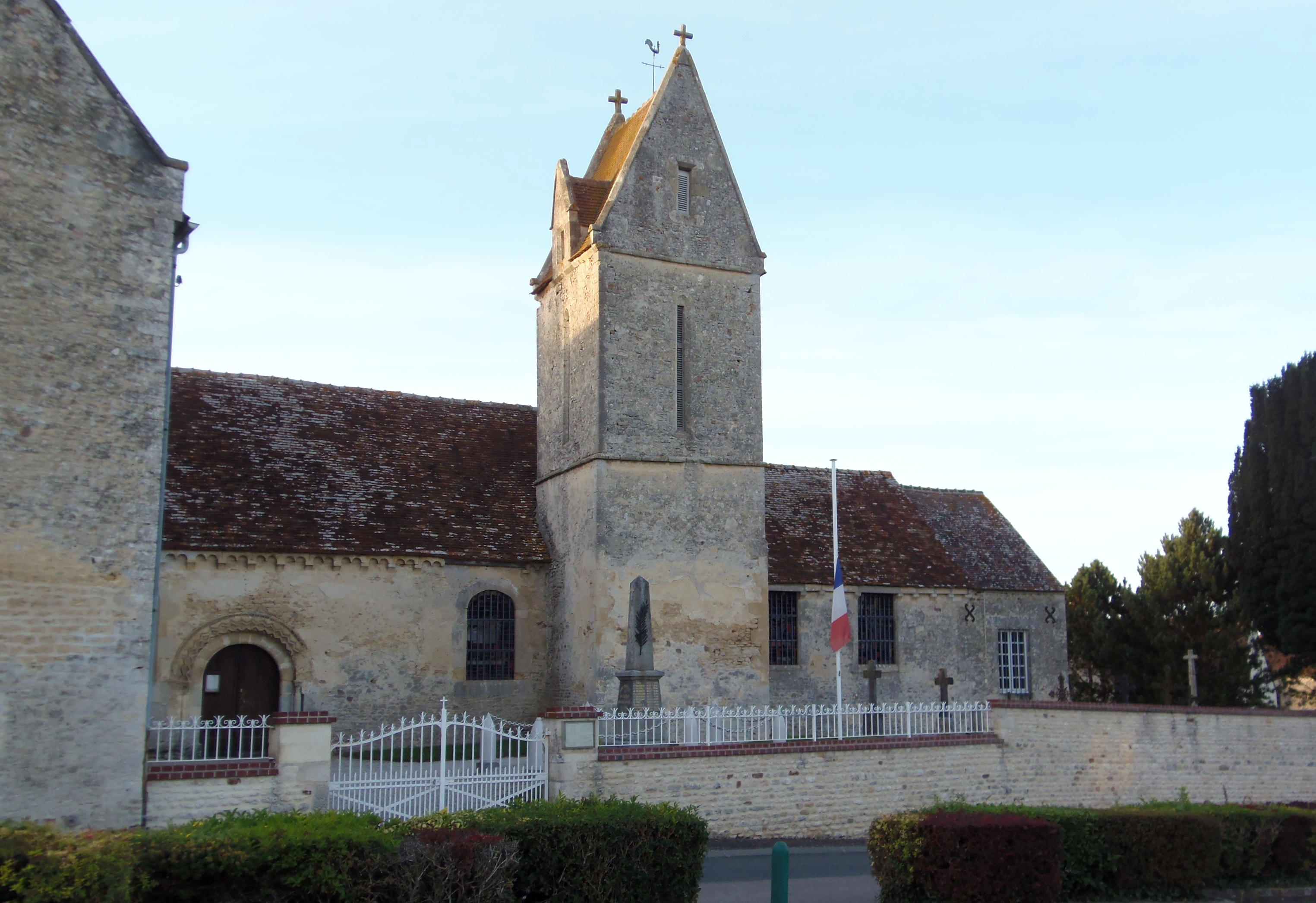
- The church in Saint-Pierre-du-Bû
- Location of Saint-Pierre-du-Bû
- Location within France Location within Normandy
- Coordinates: 48°52′08″N 0°12′57″W
- Country: France
- Region: Normandy
- Department: Calvados
- Arrondissement: Caen
- Canton: Falaise
- Intercommunality: Pays de Falaise

Government
  - Mayor (2020–2026): Jean-Claude Leroux
- Area^{1}: 7.39 km^{2} (2.85 sq mi)
- Elevation: 204 m (669 ft)
- Highest elevation: 236 m (774 ft)
- Lowest elevation: 159 m (522 ft)
- Population (2023): 436
  - Density: 59.0/km^{2} (153/sq mi)
- Time zone: UTC+01:00 (CET)
  - Summer (DST): UTC+02:00 (CEST)
- INSEE/Postal code: 14649 /14700
- ^{1} French Land Register data, which excludes lakes, ponds, glaciers > 1 km^{2} (0.386 sq mi or 247 acres) and river estuaries.

Saint-Pierre-du-Bû (French pronunciation: [sɛ̃ pjɛʁ dy by]) is a commune in the Calvados department in the Normandy region in northwestern France.

== Geography ==
The commune is made up of the following collection of villages and hamlets, Couvrigny, Les Logettes and Saint-Pierre-du-Bû.

The Rivers Trainefeuille and a stream the Gué Pierreux flow through the communes borders.

== Population ==
Historical population
Year	Pop.	±% p.a.
1968	238	—
1975	207	−1.97%
1982	242	+2.26%
1990	335	+4.15%
1999	412	+2.33%
2007	435	+0.68%
2012	489	+2.37%
2017	477	−0.50%
2023	436	−1.49%
Source: INSEE

== See also ==
- Communes of the Calvados department
