= Saint-Pierre-Canivet =

- Commune
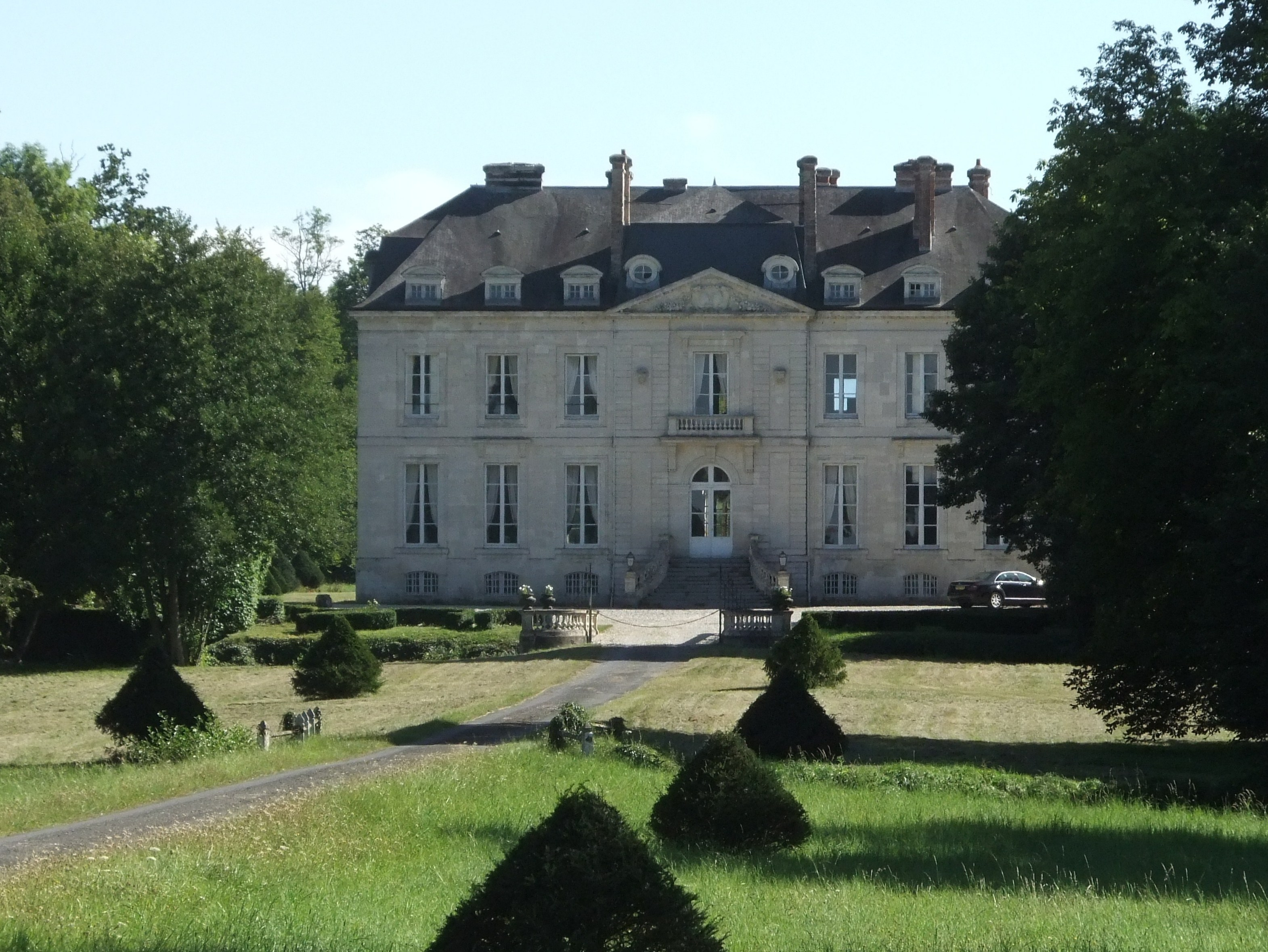
- Chateau of la Tour

- Coat of arms
- Location of Saint-Pierre-Canivet
- Location within France Location within Normandy
- Coordinates: 48°55′53″N 0°13′07″W
- Country: France
- Region: Normandy
- Department: Calvados
- Arrondissement: Caen
- Canton: Falaise
- Intercommunality: Pays de Falaise

Government
  - Mayor (2020–2026): Jean-Pierre Goupil
- Area^{1}: 7.01 km^{2} (2.71 sq mi)
- Elevation: 150 m (490 ft)
- Highest elevation: 231 m (758 ft)
- Lowest elevation: 142 m (466 ft)
- Population (2023): 462
  - Density: 65.9/km^{2} (171/sq mi)
- Time zone: UTC+01:00 (CET)
  - Summer (DST): UTC+02:00 (CEST)
- INSEE/Postal code: 14646 /14700
- ^{1} French Land Register data, which excludes lakes, ponds, glaciers > 1 km^{2} (0.386 sq mi or 247 acres) and river estuaries.

Saint-Pierre-Canivet (French pronunciation: [sɛ̃ pjɛʁ kanivɛ]) is a commune in the Calvados department in the Normandy region in northwestern France.

== Geography ==
The commune is made up of the following collection of villages and hamlets, Les Cesnes, La Jalousie and Saint-Pierre-Canivet.

The commune has three streams flowing through its borders, the Cassis, the Moussaye and the Manque-Souris.

== Population ==
Historical population
Year	Pop.	±% p.a.
1968	334	—
1975	281	−2.44%
1982	338	+2.67%
1990	381	+1.51%
1999	342	−1.19%
2007	359	+0.61%
2012	399	+2.14%
2017	400	+0.05%
2023	462	+2.43%
Source: INSEE

== Points of Interest ==
- Anciennes carrières souterraines de Saint-Pierre-Canivet et d'Aubigny is a Natura 2000 site, shared between Saint-Pierre-Canivet and neighbouring Aubigny. It is a former underground quarry that houses a number of protected species of bats, Geoffroy's bat, Greater mouse-eared bat, Greater horseshoe bat, and the Lesser horseshoe bat. The area is closed to the public.

=== National Heritage sites ===
- Château de la Tour - eighteenth century chateau that was declared a Monument historique in 1967.

== See also ==
- Communes of the Calvados department
