= Les Moutiers-en-Auge =

- Commune
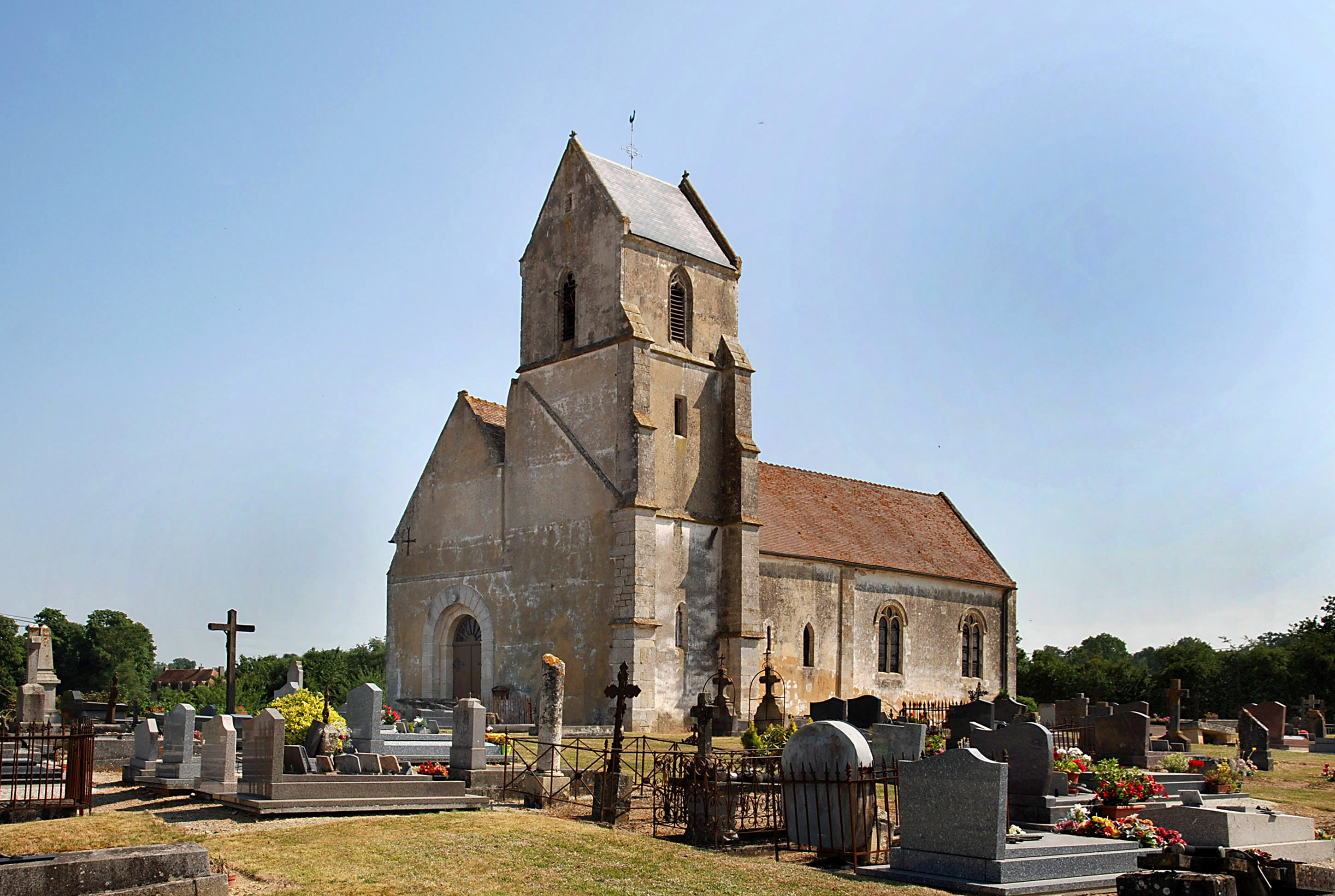
- The church in Les Moutiers-en-Auge
- Location of Les Moutiers-en-Auge
- Location within France Location within Normandy
- Coordinates: 48°53′57″N 0°00′20″W
- Country: France
- Region: Normandy
- Department: Calvados
- Arrondissement: Caen
- Canton: Falaise
- Intercommunality: Pays de Falaise

Government
  - Mayor (2020–2026): Alain Pourrit
- Area^{1}: 10.10 km^{2} (3.90 sq mi)
- Elevation: 130 m (430 ft)
- Highest elevation: 228 m (748 ft)
- Lowest elevation: 71 m (233 ft)
- Population (2023): 130
  - Density: 13/km^{2} (33/sq mi)
- Time zone: UTC+01:00 (CET)
  - Summer (DST): UTC+02:00 (CEST)
- INSEE/Postal code: 14457 /14620
- ^{1} French Land Register data, which excludes lakes, ponds, glaciers > 1 km^{2} (0.386 sq mi or 247 acres) and river estuaries.

Les Moutiers-en-Auge (French pronunciation: [le mutje ɑ̃.n‿oʒ], literally Les Moutiers in Auge) is a commune in the department of Calvados in the Normandy region in northwestern France.

Les Moutiers-en-Auge is located at the junction of the D90 and D249 departmental roads.

== Geography ==
The commune is made up of the following collection of villages and hamlets, Les Grands Moutiers and Les Petits Moutiers.

The Oudon river and the Aneries Stream are the only two watercourses running through the commune.

== Population ==
Historical population
Year	Pop.	±% p.a.
1968	142	—
1975	134	−0.82%
1982	115	−2.16%
1990	126	+1.15%
1999	121	−0.45%
2007	122	+0.10%
2012	114	−1.35%
2017	122	+1.37%
2023	130	+1.06%
Source: INSEE

== See also ==
- Communes of the Calvados department
