= Fresné-la-Mère =

- Commune
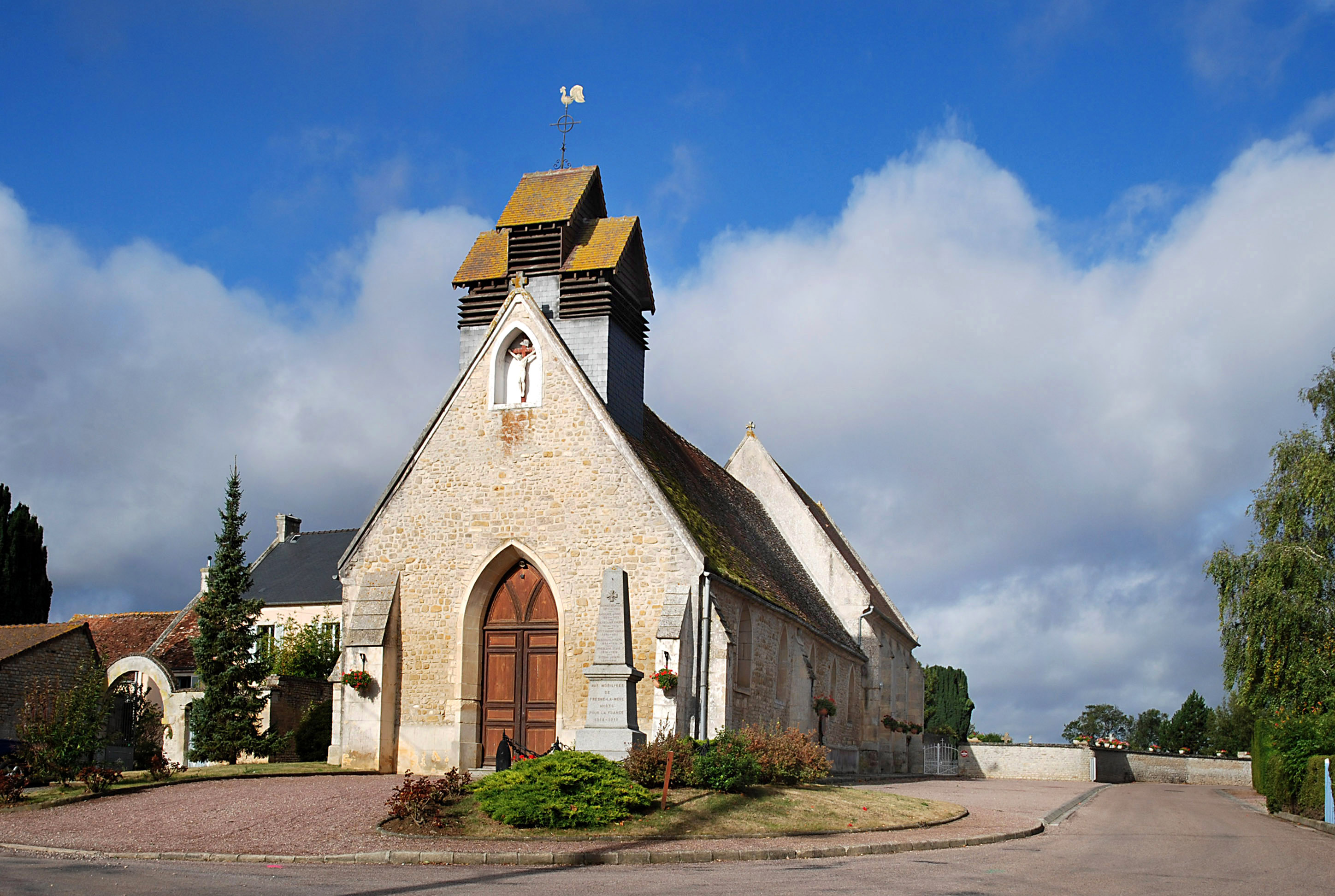
- The church in Fresné-la-Mère

- Coat of arms
- Location of Fresné-la-Mère
- Location within France Location within Normandy
- Coordinates: 48°53′42″N 0°07′14″W
- Country: France
- Region: Normandy
- Department: Calvados
- Arrondissement: Caen
- Canton: Falaise
- Intercommunality: Pays de Falaise

Government
  - Mayor (2020–2026): Maryse Lasne
- Area^{1}: 8.14 km^{2} (3.14 sq mi)
- Elevation: 95 m (312 ft)
- Highest elevation: 159 m (522 ft)
- Lowest elevation: 58 m (190 ft)
- Population (2023): 566
  - Density: 69.5/km^{2} (180/sq mi)
- Time zone: UTC+01:00 (CET)
  - Summer (DST): UTC+02:00 (CEST)
- INSEE/Postal code: 14289 /14700
- ^{1} French Land Register data, which excludes lakes, ponds, glaciers > 1 km^{2} (0.386 sq mi or 247 acres) and river estuaries.

Fresné-la-Mère (French pronunciation: [fʁɛne la mɛʁ]) is a commune in the Calvados department in the Normandy region in northwestern France.

== Geography ==
The commune is made up of the following collection of villages and hamlets, Le Camp, Angloischeville, Les Terres Rouges and Fresné-la-Mère.

Two rivers the Trainefeuille, and the Traine-feuilles runs through the commune.

== Population ==
Historical population
Year	Pop.	±% p.a.
1968	303	—
1975	334	+1.40%
1982	382	+1.94%
1990	425	+1.34%
1999	417	−0.21%
2007	480	+1.77%
2012	590	+4.21%
2017	604	+0.47%
2023	566	−1.08%
Source: INSEE

== See also ==
- Communes of the Calvados department
