= Villy-lez-Falaise =

- Commune
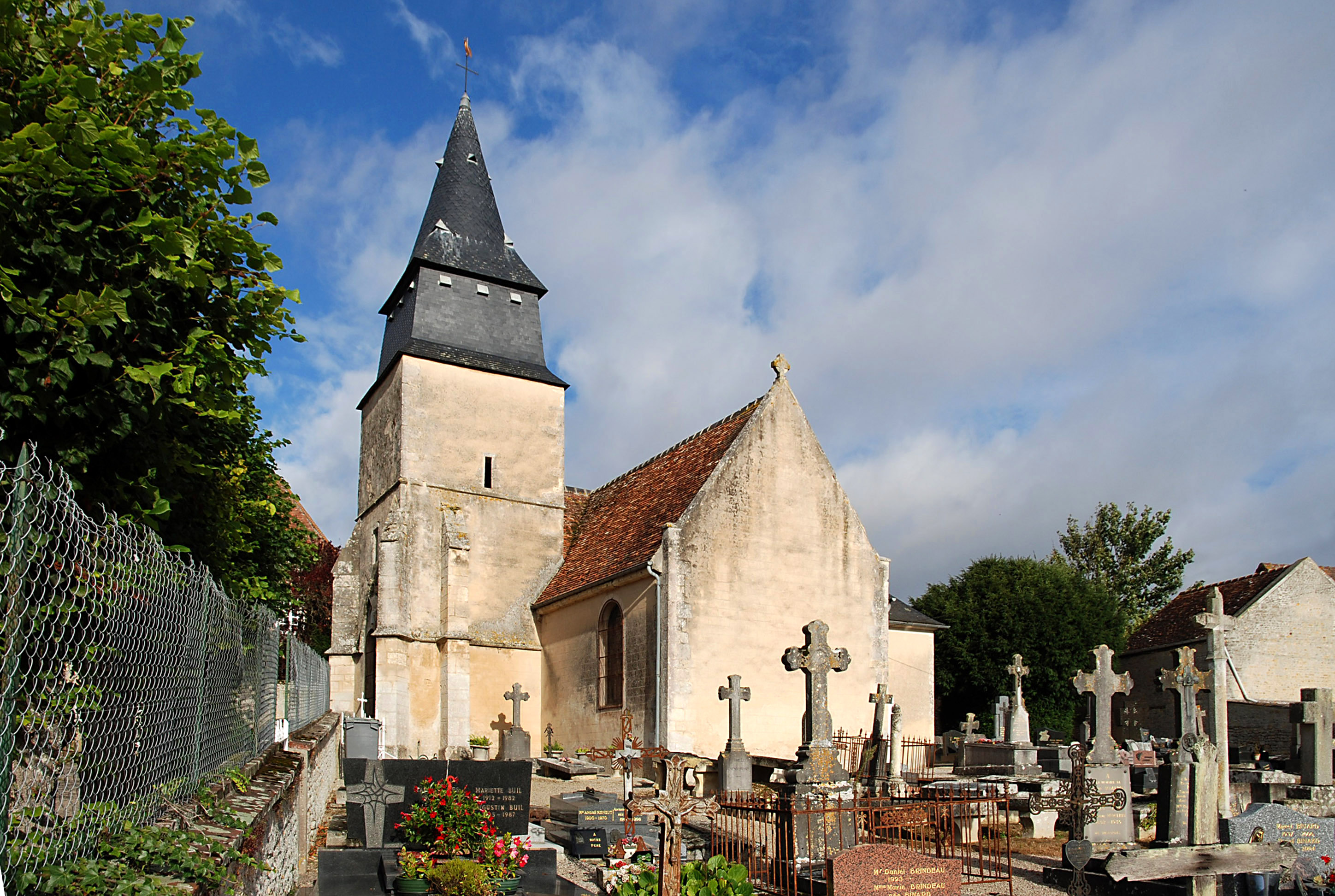
- The church in Villy-lez-Falaise
- Location of Villy-lez-Falaise
- Location within France Location within Normandy
- Coordinates: 48°53′52″N 0°08′06″W
- Country: France
- Region: Normandy
- Department: Calvados
- Arrondissement: Caen
- Canton: Falaise
- Intercommunality: Pays de Falaise

Government
  - Mayor (2020–2026): Franck Nachtergaele
- Area^{1}: 4.95 km^{2} (1.91 sq mi)
- Elevation: 100 m (330 ft)
- Highest elevation: 126 m (413 ft)
- Lowest elevation: 58 m (190 ft)
- Population (2023): 274
  - Density: 55.4/km^{2} (143/sq mi)
- Time zone: UTC+01:00 (CET)
  - Summer (DST): UTC+02:00 (CEST)
- INSEE/Postal code: 14759 /14700
- ^{1} French Land Register data, which excludes lakes, ponds, glaciers > 1 km^{2} (0.386 sq mi or 247 acres) and river estuaries.

Villy-lez-Falaise (French pronunciation: [viji lɛ falɛz], literally Villy near Falaise) is a commune in the Calvados department in the Normandy region in northwestern France.

== Geography ==
The commune is made up of the following collection of villages and hamlets, Le Vey, Le Val, Le Bout de Bas, Le Hameau and Villy-lez-Falaise.

Two rivers the Ante and the Trainefeuille runs through the commune, along with Belle Fontaine stream.

== Population ==
Historical population
Year	Pop.	±% p.a.
1968	215	—
1975	208	−0.47%
1982	190	−1.28%
1990	248	+3.39%
1999	229	−0.88%
2007	245	+0.85%
2012	270	+1.96%
2017	273	+0.22%
2023	274	+0.06%
Source: INSEE

== See also ==
- Communes of the Calvados department
