= Ernes =

- Commune
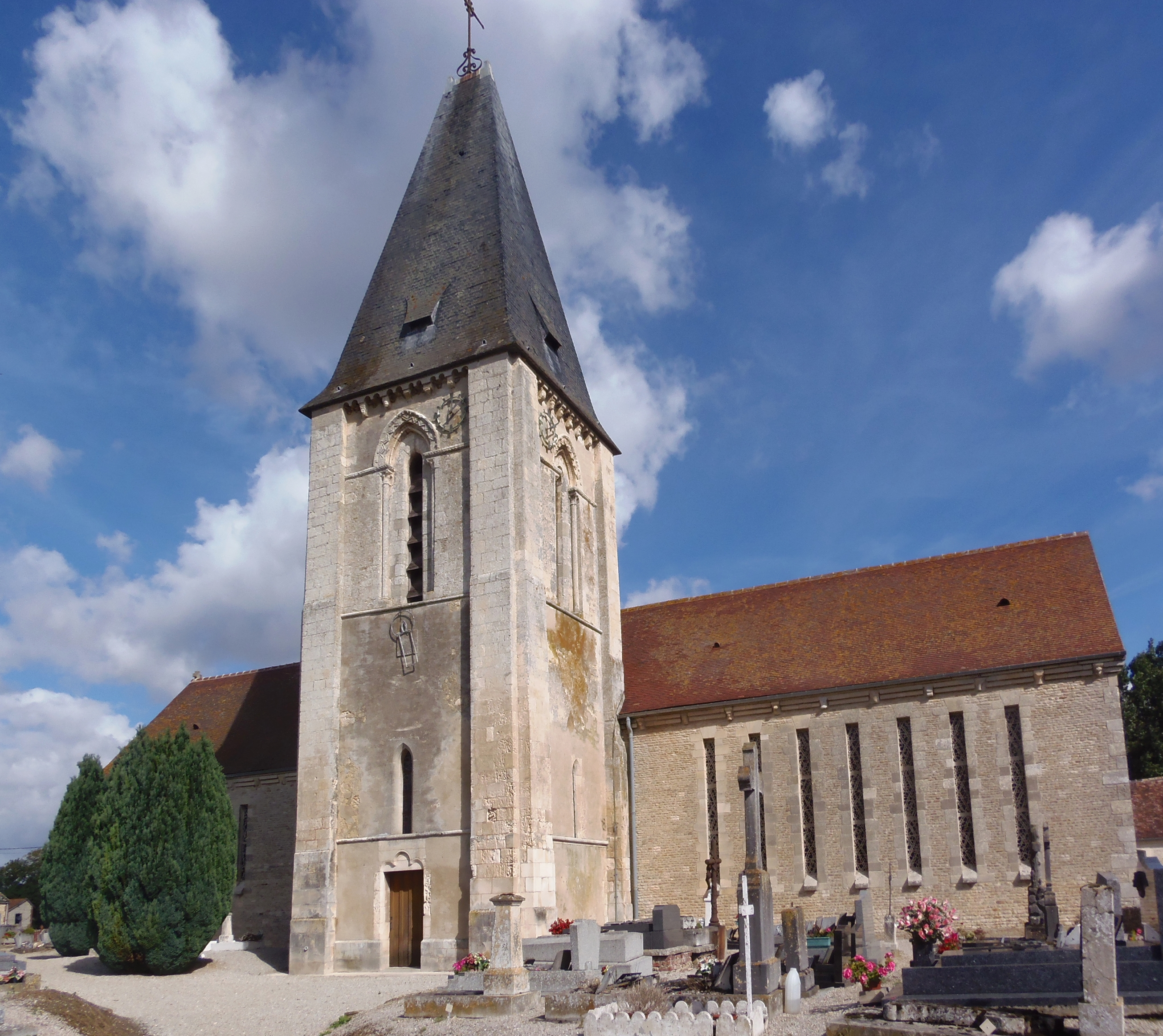
- The church in Ernes
- Location of Ernes
- Location within France Location within Normandy
- Coordinates: 49°01′03″N 0°07′20″W
- Country: France
- Region: Normandy
- Department: Calvados
- Arrondissement: Caen
- Canton: Falaise
- Intercommunality: Pays de Falaise

Government
  - Mayor (2020–2026): Xavier Lamande
- Area^{1}: 8.90 km^{2} (3.44 sq mi)
- Elevation: 50 m (160 ft)
- Highest elevation: 84 m (276 ft)
- Lowest elevation: 35 m (115 ft)
- Population (2023): 327
  - Density: 36.7/km^{2} (95.2/sq mi)
- Time zone: UTC+01:00 (CET)
  - Summer (DST): UTC+02:00 (CEST)
- INSEE/Postal code: 14245 /14270
- ^{1} French Land Register data, which excludes lakes, ponds, glaciers > 1 km^{2} (0.386 sq mi or 247 acres) and river estuaries.

Ernes is a commune in the Calvados department in the Normandy region in northwestern France.

== Geography ==
The commune is made up of the following collection of villages and hamlets, Le Bout d'Ernes and Ernes.

A single watercourse, the river Laizon flows through the commune.

== Population ==
Historical population
Year	Pop.	±% p.a.
1968	395	—
1975	322	−2.88%
1982	311	−0.50%
1990	266	−1.93%
1999	285	+0.77%
2007	296	+0.47%
2012	316	+1.32%
2017	322	+0.38%
2023	327	+0.26%
Source: INSEE

== Points of Interest ==
=== National heritage sites ===
- Église Saint-Paterne - a twelfth century church registered as a Monument historique in 1913.

== See also ==
- Communes of the Calvados department
