= Bonnœil =

Bonnoeil
- Commune
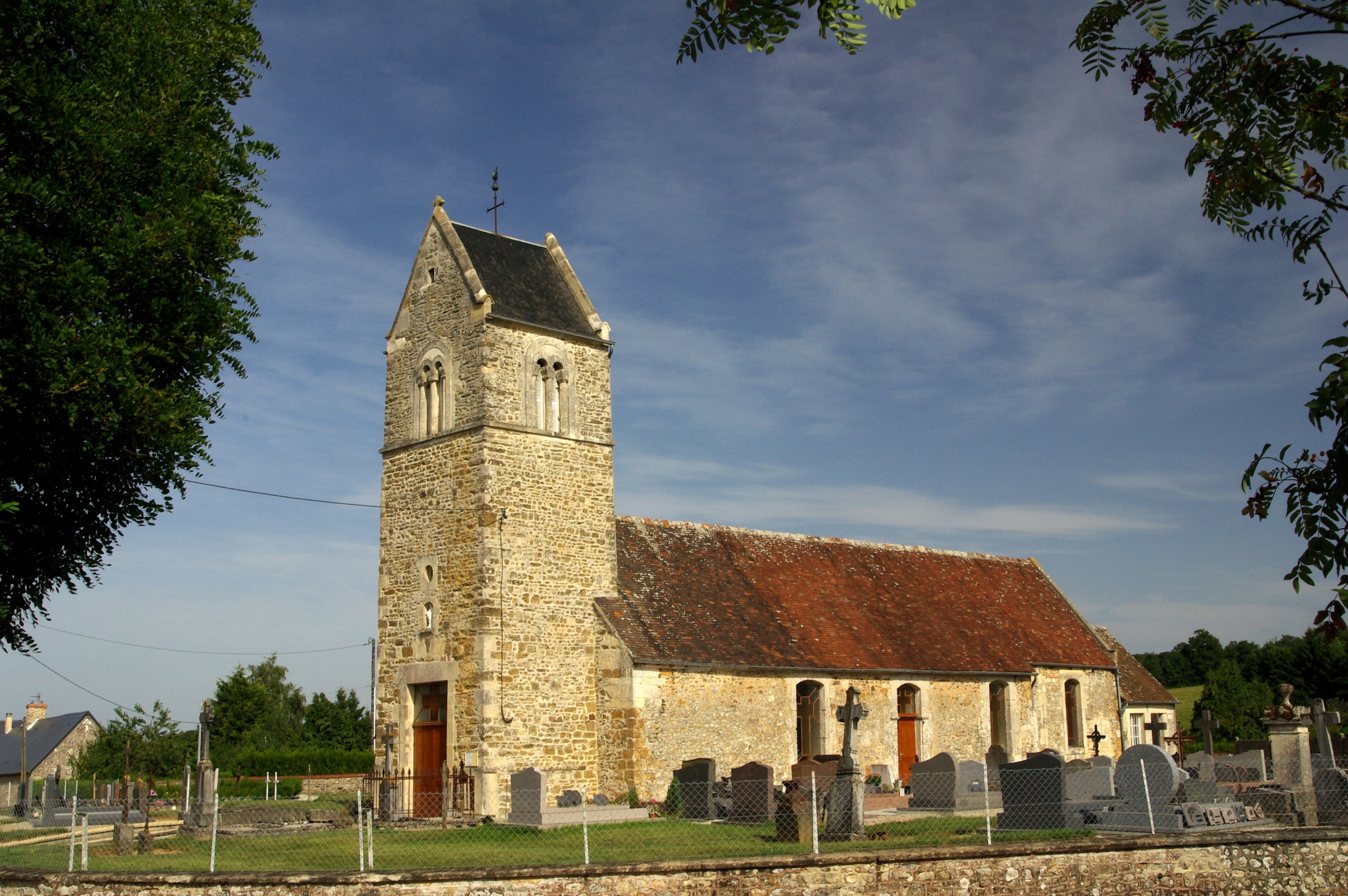
- The church in Bonnœil
- Location of Bonnoeil
- Location within France Location within Normandy
- Coordinates: 48°55′36″N 0°21′51″W
- Country: France
- Region: Normandy
- Department: Calvados
- Arrondissement: Caen
- Canton: Falaise
- Intercommunality: Pays de Falaise

Government
  - Mayor (2020–2026): Edwige Riviere
- Area^{1}: 7.19 km^{2} (2.78 sq mi)
- Elevation: 220 m (720 ft)
- Highest elevation: 293 m (961 ft)
- Lowest elevation: 175 m (574 ft)
- Population (2023): 125
  - Density: 17.4/km^{2} (45.0/sq mi)
- Time zone: UTC+01:00 (CET)
  - Summer (DST): UTC+02:00 (CEST)
- INSEE/Postal code: 14087 /14700
- ^{1} French Land Register data, which excludes lakes, ponds, glaciers > 1 km^{2} (0.386 sq mi or 247 acres) and river estuaries.

Bonnœil (French pronunciation: [bɔnœj]) is a commune in the Calvados department in the Normandy region in northwestern France.

== Geography ==
The commune is part of the area known as Suisse Normande.

The commune is made up of the following collection of villages and hamlets, Le Bas de Bonnœil, La Girardière, La Boulaye, La Mare, La Bosquie and Bonnœil.

The Grand Etang stream and The Langot are the main watercourses running through the commune.

== Population ==
Historical population
Year	Pop.	±% p.a.
1968	114	—
1975	109	−0.64%
1982	120	+1.38%
1990	120	+0.00%
1999	106	−1.37%
2007	117	+1.24%
2012	123	+1.01%
2017	131	+1.27%
2023	125	−0.78%
Source: INSEE

== See also ==
- Communes of the Calvados department
