= Olendon =

- Commune
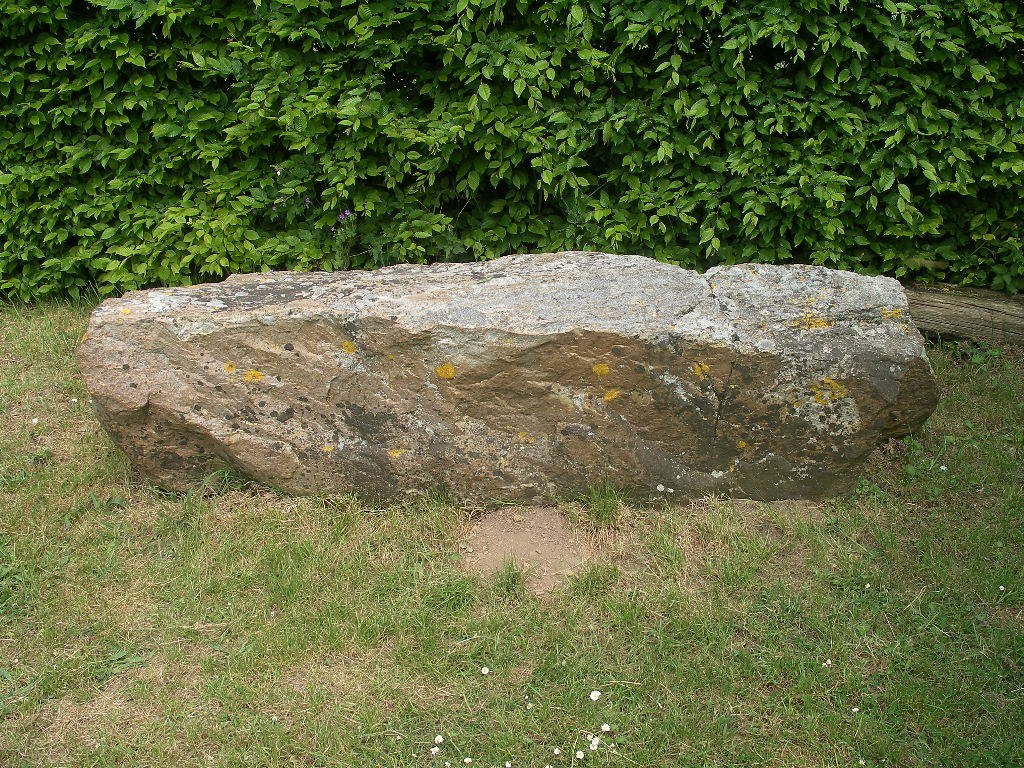
- Fallen menhir

- Coat of arms
- Location of Olendon
- Location within France Location within Normandy
- Coordinates: 48°58′11″N 0°10′12″W
- Country: France
- Region: Normandy
- Department: Calvados
- Arrondissement: Caen
- Canton: Falaise
- Intercommunality: Pays de Falaise

Government
  - Mayor (2020–2026): Norbert Blais
- Area^{1}: 7.45 km^{2} (2.88 sq mi)
- Elevation: 206 m (676 ft)
- Highest elevation: 170 m (560 ft)
- Lowest elevation: 81 m (266 ft)
- Population (2023): 190
  - Density: 26/km^{2} (66/sq mi)
- Time zone: UTC+01:00 (CET)
  - Summer (DST): UTC+02:00 (CEST)
- INSEE/Postal code: 14476 /14170
- ^{1} French Land Register data, which excludes lakes, ponds, glaciers > 1 km^{2} (0.386 sq mi or 247 acres) and river estuaries.

Olendon (French pronunciation: [ɔlɑ̃dɔ̃]) is a commune in the Calvados department in the Normandy region in northwestern France.

== Population ==
Historical population
Year	Pop.	±% p.a.
1968	160	—
1975	147	−1.20%
1982	174	+2.44%
1990	185	+0.77%
1999	168	−1.07%
2007	184	+1.14%
2012	193	+0.96%
2017	184	−0.95%
2023	190	+0.54%
Source: INSEE

== Points of Interest ==
- Le menhir d'Olendon a Neolithic 2.3m Menhir that was discovered by a local farmer and now lies on its side by the village hall.

=== National Heritage sites ===
- Le château d'Olendon is a chateau built in 1614 that was listed as a Monument historique in 1997.

== See also ==
- Communes of the Calvados department
