= Norrey-en-Auge =

- Commune
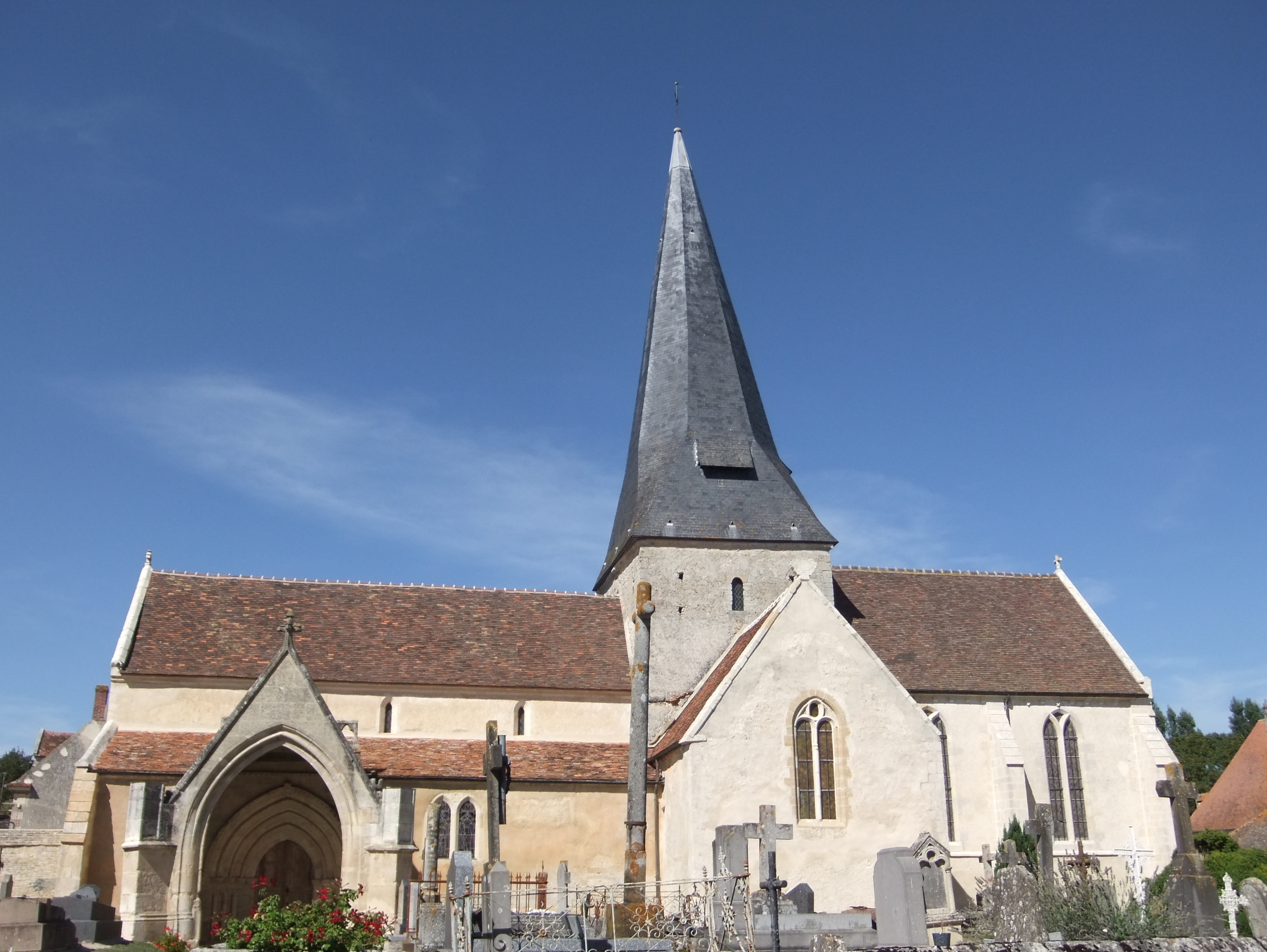
- The church in Norrey-en-Auge
- Location of Norrey-en-Auge
- Location within France Location within Normandy
- Coordinates: 48°54′49″N 0°00′54″W
- Country: France
- Region: Normandy
- Department: Calvados
- Arrondissement: Caen
- Canton: Falaise
- Intercommunality: Pays de Falaise

Government
  - Mayor (2020–2026): Michaël Oriot
- Area^{1}: 8.86 km^{2} (3.42 sq mi)
- Elevation: 65 m (213 ft)
- Highest elevation: 151 m (495 ft)
- Lowest elevation: 60 m (200 ft)
- Population (2023): 93
  - Density: 10/km^{2} (27/sq mi)
- Time zone: UTC+01:00 (CET)
  - Summer (DST): UTC+02:00 (CEST)
- INSEE/Postal code: 14469 /14620
- ^{1} French Land Register data, which excludes lakes, ponds, glaciers > 1 km^{2} (0.386 sq mi or 247 acres) and river estuaries.

Norrey-en-Auge (French pronunciation: [nɔʁɛ ɑ̃.n‿oʒ], literally Norrey in Auge) is a commune in the department of Calvados in the Normandy region in northern France.

== Geography ==
The Ruisseau des Ruaux is the only watercourse running through the commune.

== Population ==
Historical population
Year	Pop.	±% p.a.
1968	115	—
1975	108	−0.89%
1982	88	−2.88%
1990	74	−2.14%
1999	76	+0.30%
2007	99	+3.36%
2012	100	+0.20%
2017	93	−1.44%
2023	93	+0.00%
Source: INSEE

== Points of Interest ==
- Eglise Sainte-Anne - is a church built in the fourteenth century which was listed as a Monument historique in 1930.

== See also ==
- Communes of the Calvados department
