= Saint-Martin-de-Mieux =

- Commune
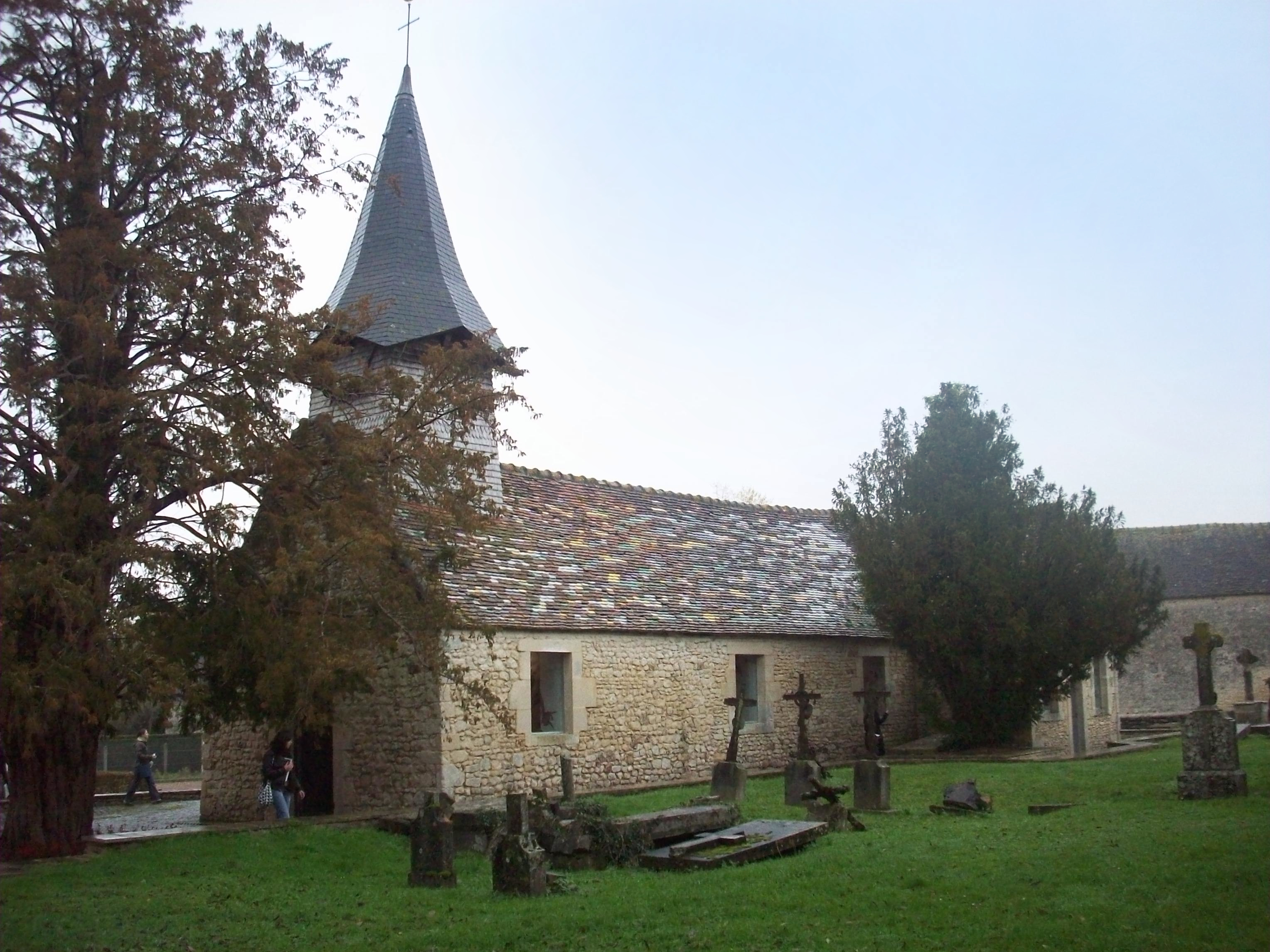
- The chapel in Saint-Martin-de-Mieux
- Location of Saint-Martin-de-Mieux
- Location within France Location within Normandy
- Coordinates: 48°52′19″N 0°13′42″W
- Country: France
- Region: Normandy
- Department: Calvados
- Arrondissement: Caen
- Canton: Falaise
- Intercommunality: Pays de Falaise

Government
  - Mayor (2020–2026): Serge Huet
- Area^{1}: 10.12 km^{2} (3.91 sq mi)
- Elevation: 220 m (720 ft)
- Highest elevation: 241 m (791 ft)
- Lowest elevation: 137 m (449 ft)
- Population (2023): 396
  - Density: 39.1/km^{2} (101/sq mi)
- Time zone: UTC+01:00 (CET)
  - Summer (DST): UTC+02:00 (CEST)
- INSEE/Postal code: 14627 /14700
- ^{1} French Land Register data, which excludes lakes, ponds, glaciers > 1 km^{2} (0.386 sq mi or 247 acres) and river estuaries.

Saint-Martin-de-Mieux (French pronunciation: [sɛ̃ maʁtɛ̃ də mjø]) is a commune in the Calvados department in the Normandy region in northwestern France.

== Geography ==
The commune of Saint-Martin-de-Mieux is part of the area known as Suisse Normande.

The commune is made up of the following collection of villages and hamlets, Saint-Martin-de-Mieux, Vallembras, Bel-air, Le Bas Tertre, La Roche and Le Mesnil Floux.

The commune has two rivers the Baize and the Ante.

== Notable Buildings & places ==
- Saint-Vigor parish church is a 17th-century church within the commune. It is a popular tourist destination as it was rescued from ruin by artist Kyoji Takubo, who renovated it during the 1990s.

== Population ==
Historical population
Year	Pop.	±% p.a.
1968	225	—
1975	238	+0.81%
1982	297	+3.21%
1990	379	+3.09%
1999	356	−0.69%
2007	405	+1.63%
2012	441	+1.72%
2017	423	−0.83%
2023	396	−1.09%
Source: INSEE

== See also ==
- Communes of the Calvados department
