= Tréprel =

- Commune
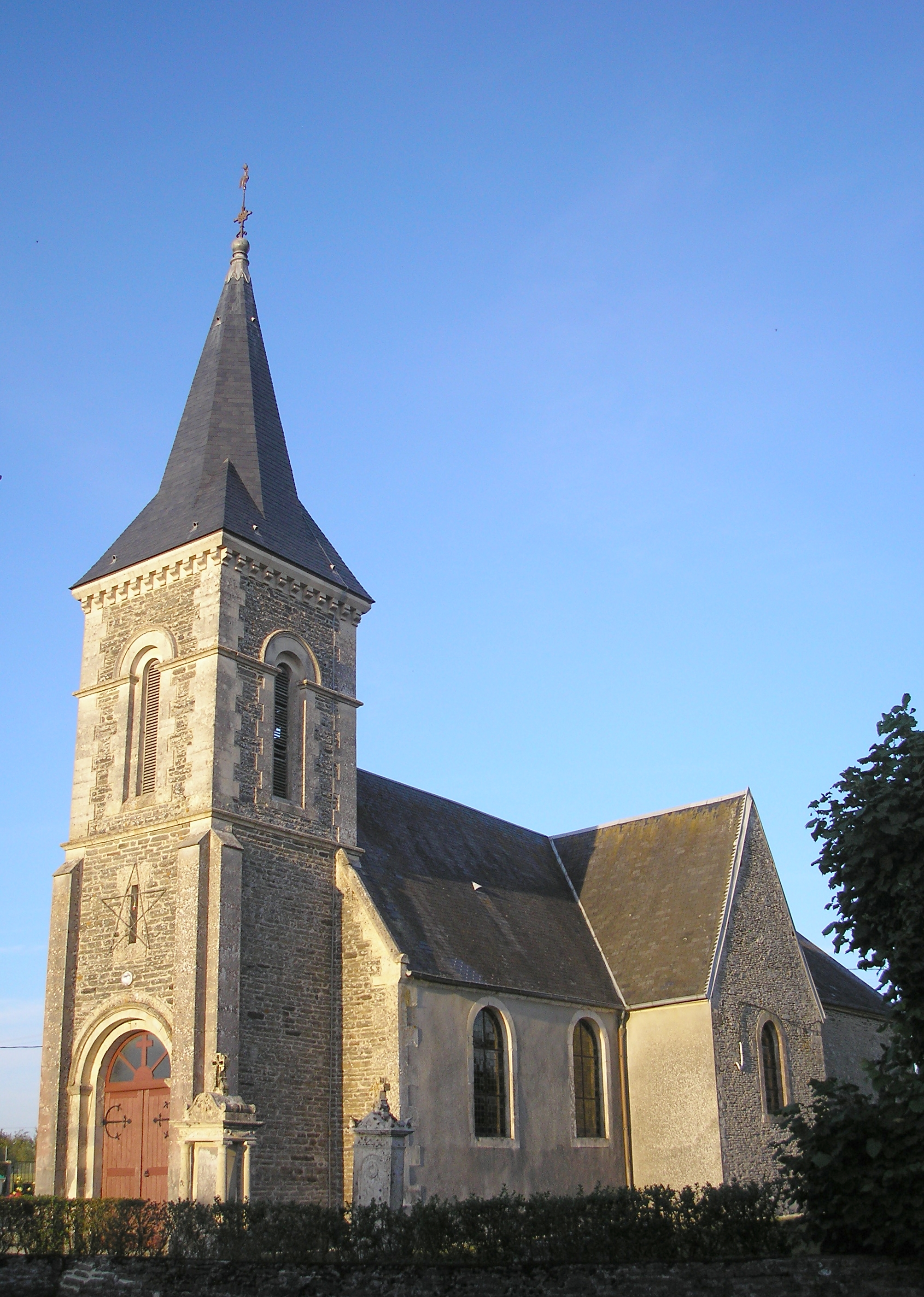
- The church in Tréprel

- Coat of arms
- Location of Tréprel
- Location within France Location within Normandy
- Coordinates: 48°53′54″N 0°20′44″W
- Country: France
- Region: Normandy
- Department: Calvados
- Arrondissement: Caen
- Canton: Falaise
- Intercommunality: Pays de Falaise

Government
  - Mayor (2020–2026): Mauricette Margueritte
- Area^{1}: 5.40 km^{2} (2.08 sq mi)
- Elevation: 244 m (801 ft)
- Highest elevation: 246 m (807 ft)
- Lowest elevation: 130 m (430 ft)
- Population (2023): 112
  - Density: 20.7/km^{2} (53.7/sq mi)
- Time zone: UTC+01:00 (CET)
  - Summer (DST): UTC+02:00 (CEST)
- INSEE/Postal code: 14710 /14690
- ^{1} French Land Register data, which excludes lakes, ponds, glaciers > 1 km^{2} (0.386 sq mi or 247 acres) and river estuaries.

Tréprel (French pronunciation: [tʁepʁɛl]) is a commune in the Calvados department in the Normandy region in northwestern France.

== Geography ==
The commune is part of the area known as Suisse Normande.

The commune is made up of the following collection of villages and hamlets, La Meslière, La Cour, Éraines, Le Hamel and Tréprel.

The commune has six streams running through it The Etre, The Val la Here, La Mesliere, La Rue, The Langot and The Val d'Anis.

== Population ==
Historical population
Year	Pop.	±% p.a.
1968	105	—
1975	92	−1.87%
1982	102	+1.48%
1990	111	+1.06%
1999	108	−0.30%
2007	101	−0.83%
2012	106	+0.97%
2017	108	+0.37%
2023	112	+0.61%
Source: INSEE

== Points of interest ==
=== National heritage sites ===
- Château de la Motte eighteenth century chateau, that was listed as a Monument historique in 2013.

== See also ==
- Communes of the Calvados department
