= Eraines =

- Commune
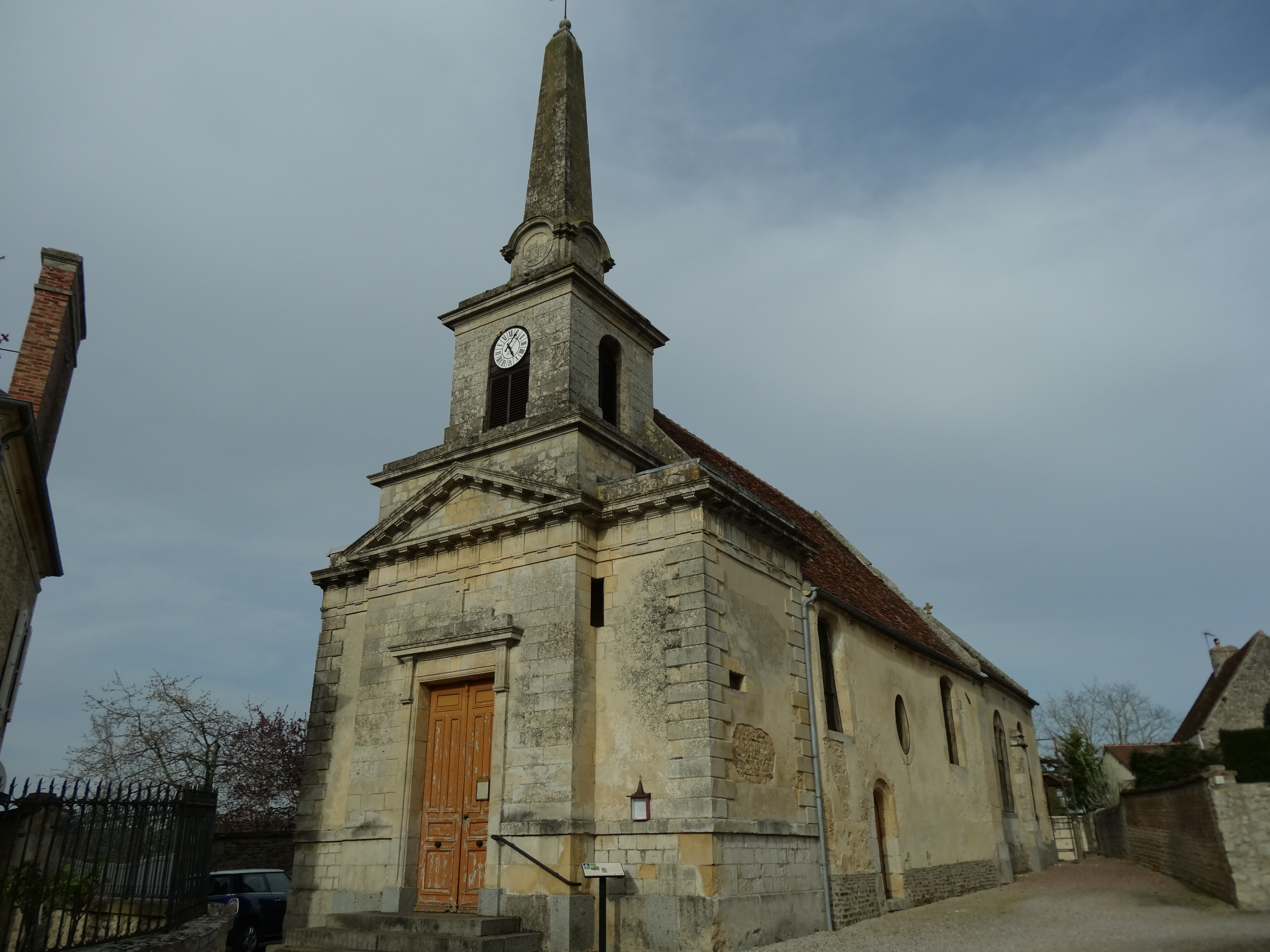
- The church in Eraines
- Location of Eraines
- Location within France Location within Normandy
- Coordinates: 48°54′34″N 0°09′32″W
- Country: France
- Region: Normandy
- Department: Calvados
- Arrondissement: Caen
- Canton: Falaise
- Intercommunality: Pays de Falaise

Government
  - Mayor (2020–2026): Jean-Philippe Mesnil
- Area^{1}: 4.04 km^{2} (1.56 sq mi)
- Elevation: 100 m (330 ft)
- Highest elevation: 148 m (486 ft)
- Lowest elevation: 64 m (210 ft)
- Population (2023): 279
  - Density: 69.1/km^{2} (179/sq mi)
- Time zone: UTC+01:00 (CET)
  - Summer (DST): UTC+02:00 (CEST)
- INSEE/Postal code: 14244 /14700
- ^{1} French Land Register data, which excludes lakes, ponds, glaciers > 1 km^{2} (0.386 sq mi or 247 acres) and river estuaries.

Eraines (French pronunciation: [eʁɛn]) is a commune in the Calvados department in the Normandy region in northwestern France.

== Geography ==
The commune is made up of the following collection of villages and hamlets, Le Courseulle, Hameau de la Vallée and Eraines.

The river Ante and the Belle Fontaine Stream flow through the commune.

== Population ==
Historical population
Year	Pop.	±% p.a.
1968	121	—
1975	142	+2.31%
1982	175	+3.03%
1990	172	−0.22%
1999	228	+3.18%
2007	249	+1.11%
2012	331	+5.86%
2017	349	+1.06%
2023	279	−3.66%
Source: INSEE

== See also ==
- Communes of the Calvados department
