= Ouilly-le-Tesson =

- Commune
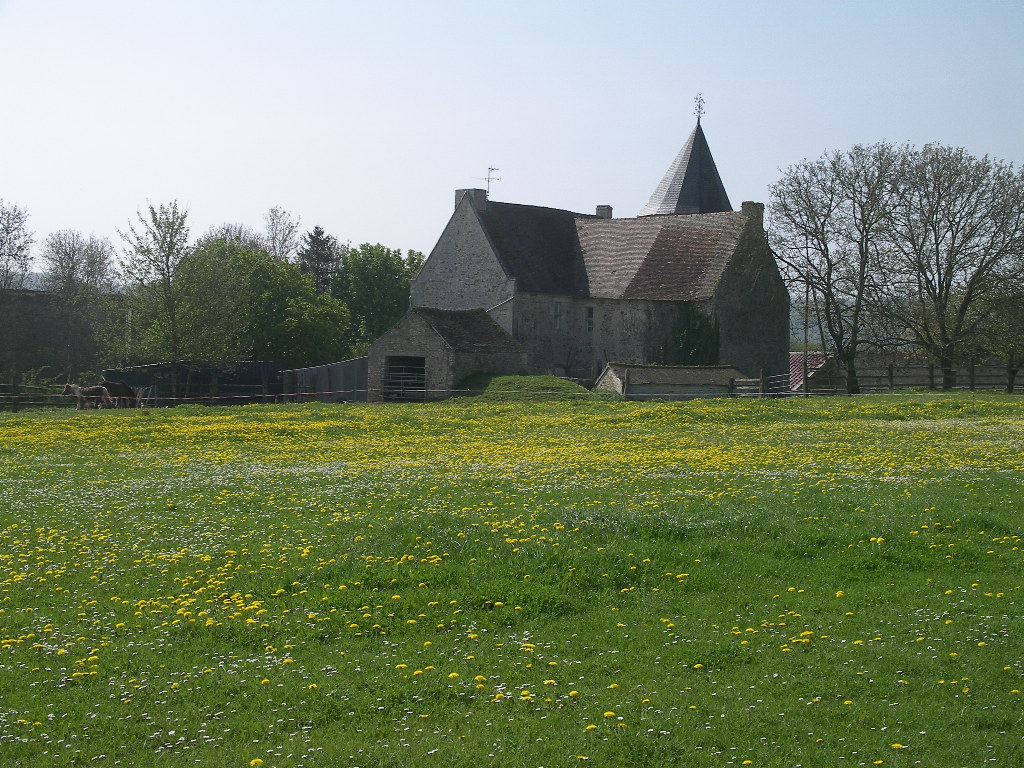
- Manoir
- Location of Ouilly-le-Tesson
- Location within France Location within Normandy
- Coordinates: 48°59′19″N 0°13′13″W
- Country: France
- Region: Normandy
- Department: Calvados
- Arrondissement: Caen
- Canton: Falaise
- Intercommunality: Pays de Falaise

Government
  - Mayor (2020–2026): Jean-Yves Heurtin
- Area^{1}: 12.00 km^{2} (4.63 sq mi)
- Elevation: 160 m (520 ft)
- Highest elevation: 165 m (541 ft)
- Lowest elevation: 67 m (220 ft)
- Population (2023): 571
  - Density: 47.6/km^{2} (123/sq mi)
- Time zone: UTC+01:00 (CET)
  - Summer (DST): UTC+02:00 (CEST)
- INSEE/Postal code: 14486 /14190
- ^{1} French Land Register data, which excludes lakes, ponds, glaciers > 1 km^{2} (0.386 sq mi or 247 acres) and river estuaries.

Ouilly-le-Tesson (French pronunciation: [uji lə tɛsɔ̃]) is a commune in the Calvados department in the Normandy region in northwestern France.

== Geography ==
The commune is made up of the following collection of villages and hamlets, Assy, Montboint, Les Maisons Neuves, Les Hauts Vents, Plaids and Ouilly-le-Tesson.

A single watercourse, the river Laizon flows through the commune.

== Population ==
Historical population
Year	Pop.	±% p.a.
1968	466	—
1975	432	−1.08%
1982	507	+2.31%
1990	523	+0.39%
1999	483	−0.88%
2007	527	+1.10%
2012	551	+0.89%
2017	591	+1.41%
2023	571	−0.57%
Source: INSEE

== Points of Interest ==
=== National heritage sites ===
The commune has two sites listed as a Monument historique.

- Old manor house - a fourteenth century Manor house listed as a monument in 1928.
- Château d'Assy - a sixteenth century Château, it was listed as a monument in 1929.

== See also ==
- Communes of the Calvados department
