= Le Détroit =

- Commune
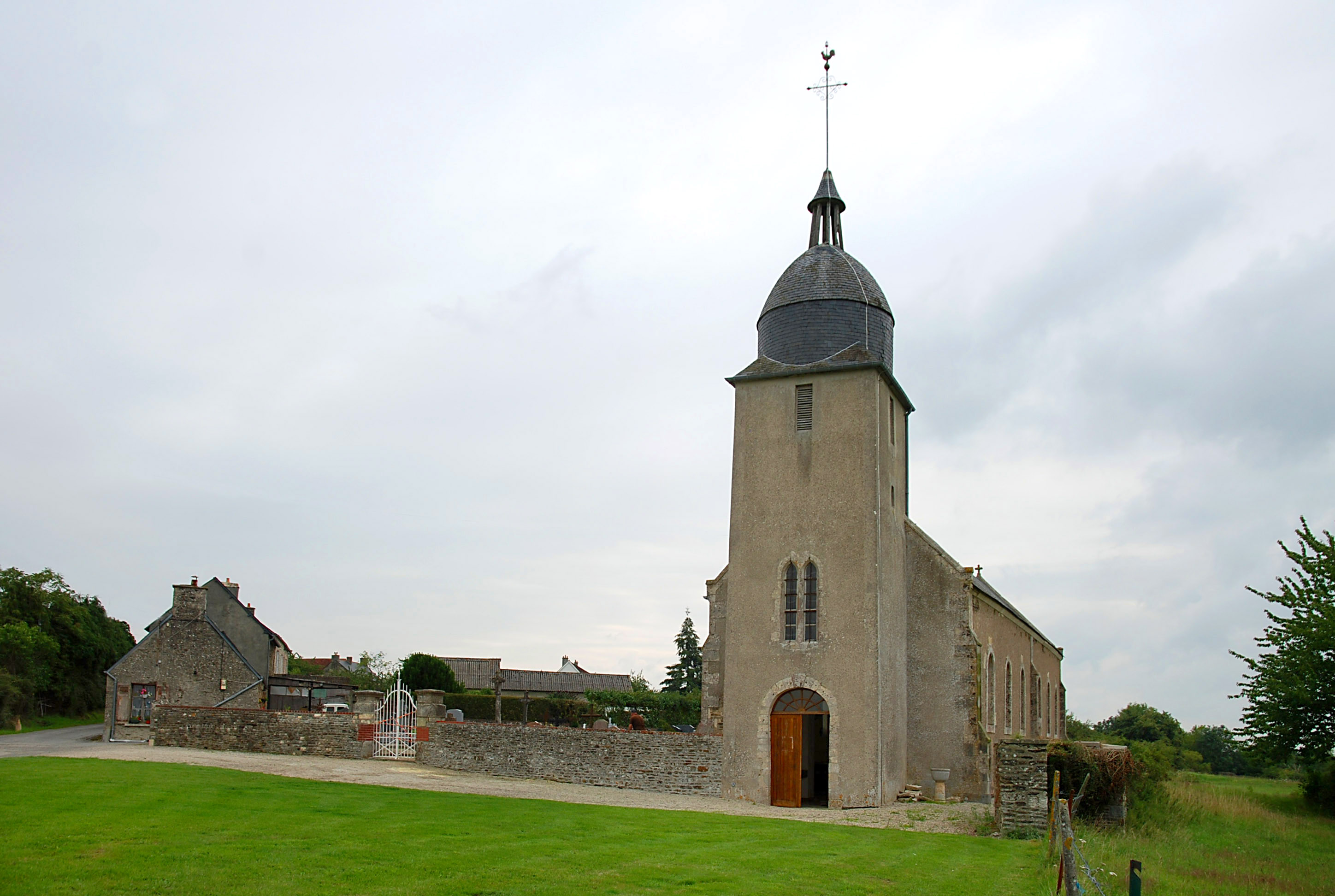
- The church in Le Détroit

- Coat of arms
- Location of Le Détroit
- Location within France Location within Normandy
- Coordinates: 48°52′04″N 0°20′56″W
- Country: France
- Region: Normandy
- Department: Calvados
- Arrondissement: Caen
- Canton: Falaise
- Intercommunality: Pays de Falaise

Government
  - Mayor (2020–2026): Gilbert Dufay
- Area^{1}: 5.52 km^{2} (2.13 sq mi)
- Elevation: 200 m (660 ft)
- Highest elevation: 251 m (823 ft)
- Lowest elevation: 89 m (292 ft)
- Population (2023): 94
  - Density: 17/km^{2} (44/sq mi)
- Time zone: UTC+01:00 (CET)
  - Summer (DST): UTC+02:00 (CEST)
- INSEE/Postal code: 14223 /14690
- ^{1} French Land Register data, which excludes lakes, ponds, glaciers > 1 km^{2} (0.386 sq mi or 247 acres) and river estuaries.

Le Détroit (French pronunciation: [lə detʁwa], literally "The Strait") is a commune in the Calvados department in the Normandy region in northwestern France.

== Geography ==
The commune is part of the area known as Suisse Normande.

The commune is made up of the following collection of villages and hamlets, Le Beau du Douit, Les Noës du Fay and Le Détroit.

The commune has six streams running through it The Val la Here, La Boullonniere, The Val d'Anis and The Val Corbel.

== Population ==
Historical population
Year	Pop.	±% p.a.
1968	99	—
1975	83	−2.49%
1982	76	−1.25%
1990	82	+0.95%
1999	90	+1.04%
2007	87	−0.42%
2012	90	+0.68%
2017	87	−0.68%
2023	94	+1.30%
Source: INSEE

== See also ==
- Detroit, Michigan
- Detroit River
- Communes of the Calvados department
