= Noron-l'Abbaye =

- Commune
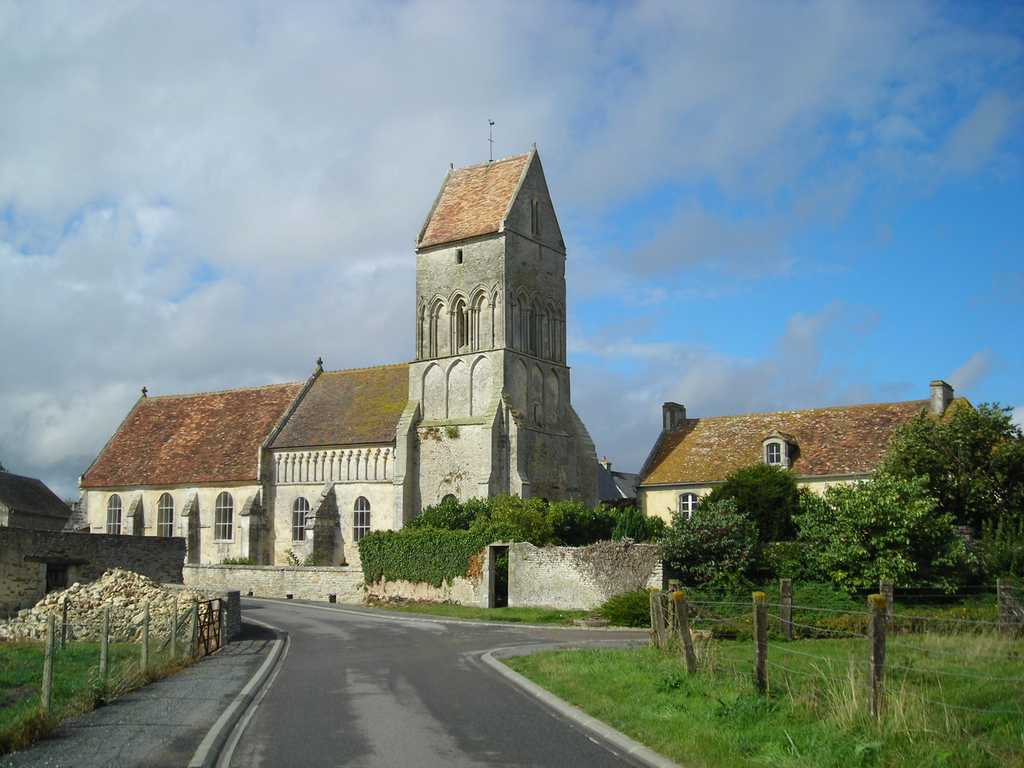
- The church in Noron-l'Abbaye
- Location of Noron-l'Abbaye
- Location within France Location within Normandy
- Coordinates: 48°53′41″N 0°14′41″W
- Country: France
- Region: Normandy
- Department: Calvados
- Arrondissement: Caen
- Canton: Falaise
- Intercommunality: Pays de Falaise

Government
  - Mayor (2020–2026): Jean-René Gieszczyk
- Area^{1}: 7.62 km^{2} (2.94 sq mi)
- Elevation: 180 m (590 ft)
- Highest elevation: 229 m (751 ft)
- Lowest elevation: 154 m (505 ft)
- Population (2023): 327
  - Density: 42.9/km^{2} (111/sq mi)
- Time zone: UTC+01:00 (CET)
  - Summer (DST): UTC+02:00 (CEST)
- INSEE/Postal code: 14467 /14700
- ^{1} French Land Register data, which excludes lakes, ponds, glaciers > 1 km^{2} (0.386 sq mi or 247 acres) and river estuaries.

Noron-l'Abbaye (French pronunciation: [nɔʁɔ̃ labei]) is a commune in the department of Calvados in the Normandy region in northwestern France.

== Geography ==
The commune is part of the area known as Suisse Normande.

The commune is made up of the following collection of villages and hamlets, La Bruyère, Le Jageolet, Le Haut Vallon, Miette and Noron-l'Abbaye.

The river Ante runs through the commune, along with five streams The Manque-Souris, The Noron, The Cassis, The Château de Long Pré and The Frégis.

== Population ==
Historical population
Year	Pop.	±% p.a.
1968	192	—
1975	182	−0.76%
1982	184	+0.16%
1990	211	+1.73%
1999	220	+0.47%
2007	279	+3.01%
2012	329	+3.35%
2017	301	−1.76%
2023	327	+1.39%
Source: INSEE

== Points of interest ==
=== National heritage sites ===
The Commune has two buildings and areas listed as a Monument historique

- Old priory 12th century former priory that was listed as a monument in 1928.
- Church of Saint-Cyr 13th century church listed as a monument in 1928.

== See also ==
- Communes of the Calvados department
