= Vicques, Calvados =

Vicques
- Commune
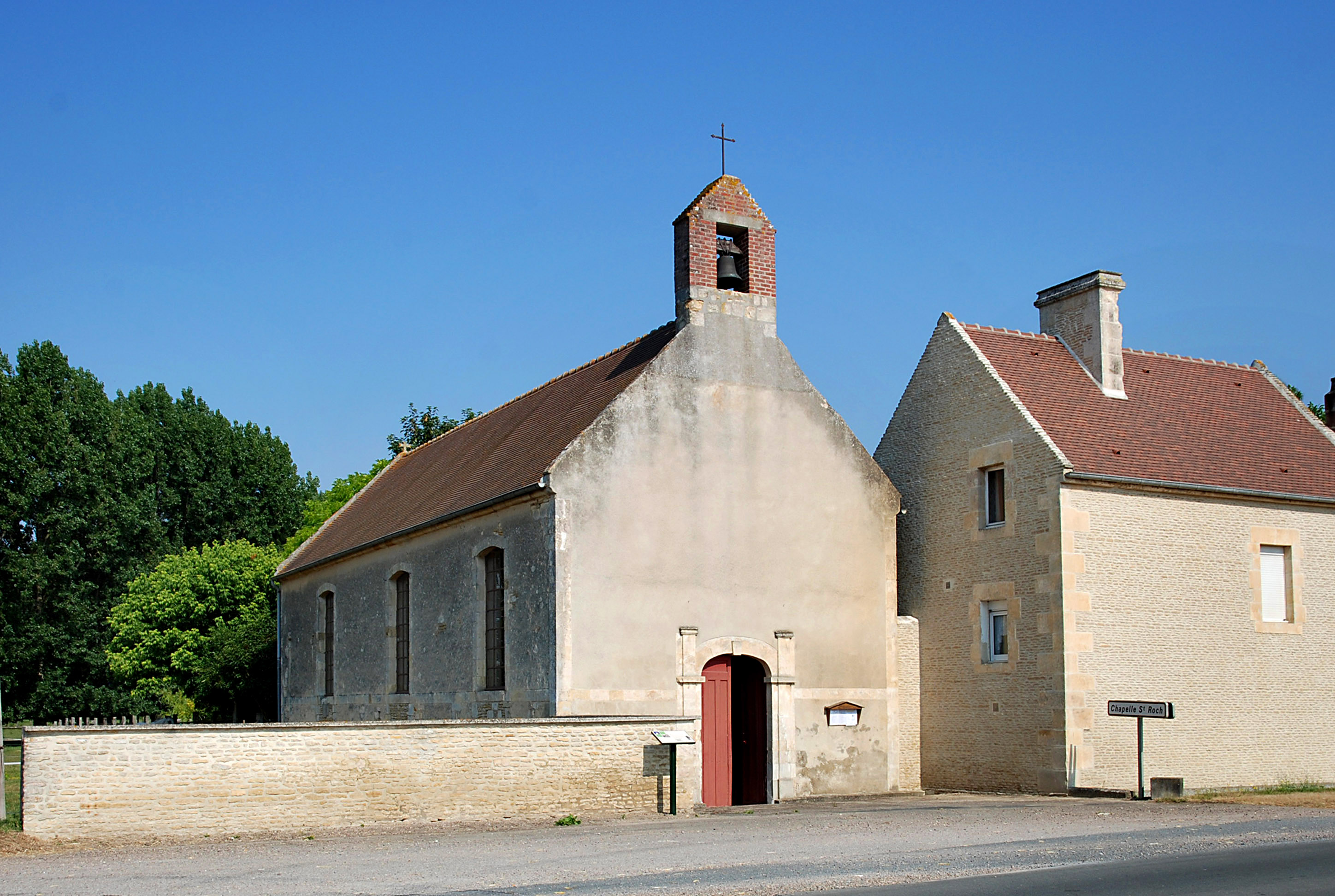
- The church in Vicques
- Location of Vicques
- Location within France Location within Normandy
- Coordinates: 48°56′56″N 0°04′32″W
- Country: France
- Region: Normandy
- Department: Calvados
- Arrondissement: Caen
- Canton: Falaise
- Intercommunality: Pays de Falaise

Government
  - Mayor (2020–2026): Jean-Yves Leboucq
- Area^{1}: 2.66 km^{2} (1.03 sq mi)
- Elevation: 60 m (200 ft)
- Highest elevation: 64 m (210 ft)
- Lowest elevation: 33 m (108 ft)
- Population (2023): 67
  - Density: 25/km^{2} (65/sq mi)
- Time zone: UTC+01:00 (CET)
  - Summer (DST): UTC+02:00 (CEST)
- INSEE/Postal code: 14742 /14170
- ^{1} French Land Register data, which excludes lakes, ponds, glaciers > 1 km^{2} (0.386 sq mi or 247 acres) and river estuaries.

Vicques (French pronunciation: [vik]) is a commune in the Calvados department in the Normandy region in northwestern France.

== Geography ==
The commune is made up of the following collection of villages and hamlets, Vicquette and Vicques.

The Dives is the only river running through the commune.

== Population ==
Historical population
Year	Pop.	±% p.a.
1968	60	—
1975	53	−1.76%
1982	53	+0.00%
1990	63	+2.18%
1999	50	−2.54%
2007	52	+0.49%
2012	65	+4.56%
2017	70	+1.49%
2023	67	−0.73%
Source: INSEE

== Points of Interest ==
- Château à Vicques - a sixteenth century Château built on the site of a twelfth century castle that was listed as a Monument historique in 1975.

== See also ==
- Communes of the Calvados department
