= Arrondissement of Caen =

Coordinates: 49°11′05″N 0°21′55″W

Caen
- Arrondissement
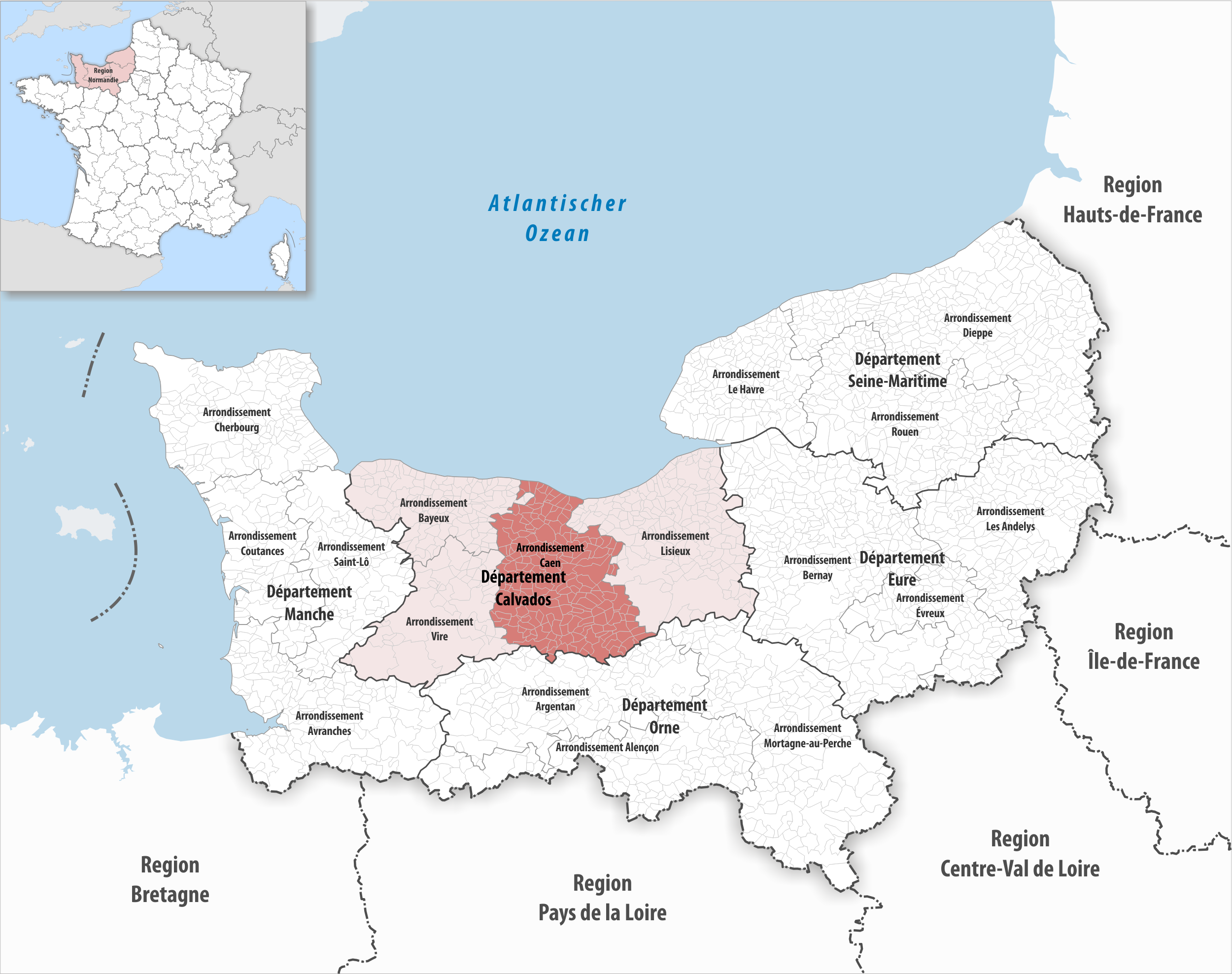
- Location within the region Normandy
- Country: France
- Region: Normandy
- Department: Calvados
- No. of communes: {{{nbcomm}}}
- Area: 1,595.7 km^{2} (616.1 sq mi)
- Population (2023): 403,821
  - Density: 253.07/km^{2} (655.44/sq mi)
- INSEE code: 142

The arrondissement of Caen is an arrondissement of France in the Calvados department in the Normandy region. It has 200 communes. Its population is 395,885 (2021), and its area is 1,595.7 km^{2} (616.1 sq mi).

== Composition ==
The communes of the arrondissement of Caen, and their INSEE codes, are:

1. Amayé-sur-Orne (14006)
2. Anisy (14015)
3. Argences (14020)
4. Aubigny (14025)
5. Authie (14030)
6. Avenay (14034)
7. Banneville-la-Campagne (14036)
8. Barbery (14039)
9. Baron-sur-Odon (14042)
10. Barou-en-Auge (14043)
11. Basly (14044)
12. Beaumais (14053)
13. Bellengreville (14057)
14. Bénouville (14060)
15. Bernières-d'Ailly (14064)
16. Bernières-sur-Mer (14066)
17. Biéville-Beuville (14068)
18. Blainville-sur-Orne (14076)
19. Le Bô (14080)
20. Bonnœil (14087)
21. Bons-Tassilly (14088)
22. Bougy (14089)
23. Boulon (14090)
24. Bourguébus (14092)
25. Bretteville-le-Rabet (14097)
26. Bretteville-sur-Laize (14100)
27. Bretteville-sur-Odon (14101)
28. Le Bû-sur-Rouvres (14116)
29. Caen (14118)
30. Cagny (14119)
31. La Caine (14122)
32. Cairon (14123)
33. Cambes-en-Plaine (14125)
34. Canteloup (14134)
35. Carpiquet (14137)
36. Le Castelet (14554)
37. Castine-en-Plaine (14538)
38. Cauvicourt (14145)
39. Cauville (14146)
40. Cesny-aux-Vignes (14149)
41. Cesny-les-Sources (14150)
42. Cintheaux (14160)
43. Clécy (14162)
44. Cléville (14163)
45. Colleville-Montgomery (14166)
46. Colombelles (14167)
47. Colomby-Anguerny (14014)
48. Combray (14171)
49. Condé-sur-Ifs (14173)
50. Cordey (14180)
51. Cormelles-le-Royal (14181)
52. Cossesseville (14183)
53. Courcy (14190)
54. Courseulles-sur-Mer (14191)
55. Cresserons (14197)
56. Crocy (14206)
57. Croisilles (14207)
58. Culey-le-Patry (14211)
59. Cuverville (14215)
60. Damblainville (14216)
61. Démouville (14221)
62. Le Détroit (14223)
63. Donnay (14226)
64. Douvres-la-Délivrande (14228)
65. Émiéville (14237)
66. Épaney (14240)
67. Épron (14242)
68. Eraines (14244)
69. Ernes (14245)
70. Espins (14248)
71. Esquay-Notre-Dame (14249)
72. Esson (14251)
73. Estrées-la-Campagne (14252)
74. Éterville (14254)
75. Évrecy (14257)
76. Falaise (14258)
77. Feuguerolles-Bully (14266)
78. Fleury-sur-Orne (14271)
79. Fontaine-Étoupefour (14274)
80. Fontaine-le-Pin (14276)
81. Fontenay-le-Marmion (14277)
82. Fourches (14283)
83. Fourneaux-le-Val (14284)
84. Frénouville (14287)
85. Le Fresne-Camilly (14288)
86. Fresné-la-Mère (14289)
87. Fresney-le-Puceux (14290)
88. Fresney-le-Vieux (14291)
89. Gavrus (14297)
90. Giberville (14301)
91. Gouvix (14309)
92. Grainville-Langannerie (14310)
93. Grainville-sur-Odon (14311)
94. Grentheville (14319)
95. Grimbosq (14320)
96. Hermanville-sur-Mer (14325)
97. Hérouville-Saint-Clair (14327)
98. La Hoguette (14332)
99. Ifs (14341)
100. Les Isles-Bardel (14343)
101. Janville (14344)
102. Jort (14345)
103. Laize-Clinchamps (14349)
104. Langrune-sur-Mer (14354)
105. Leffard (14360)
106. Lion-sur-Mer (14365)
107. Les Loges-Saulces (14375)
108. Louvagny (14381)
109. Louvigny (14383)
110. Luc-sur-Mer (14384)
111. Maizet (14393)
112. Maizières (14394)
113. Maltot (14396)
114. Le Marais-la-Chapelle (14402)
115. Martainville (14404)
116. Martigny-sur-l'Ante (14405)
117. Mathieu (14407)
118. Meslay (14411)
119. Le Mesnil-Villement (14427)
120. Mondeville (14437)
121. Mondrainville (14438)
122. Montigny (14446)
123. Montillières-sur-Orne (14713)
124. Morteaux-Coulibœuf (14452)
125. Mouen (14454)
126. Moulines (14455)
127. Moult-Chicheboville (14456)
128. Les Moutiers-en-Auge (14457)
129. Les Moutiers-en-Cinglais (14458)
130. Mutrécy (14461)
131. Noron-l'Abbaye (14467)
132. Norrey-en-Auge (14469)
133. Olendon (14476)
134. Ouézy (14482)
135. Ouffières (14483)
136. Ouilly-le-Tesson (14486)
137. Ouistreham (14488)
138. Périers-sur-le-Dan (14495)
139. Perrières (14497)
140. Pertheville-Ners (14498)
141. Pierrefitte-en-Cinglais (14501)
142. Pierrepont (14502)
143. Plumetot (14509)
144. La Pommeraye (14510)
145. Pont-d'Ouilly (14764)
146. Potigny (14516)
147. Préaux-Bocage (14519)
148. Rapilly (14531)
149. Reviers (14535)
150. Rosel (14542)
151. Rots (14543)
152. Rouvres (14546)
153. Saint-André-sur-Orne (14556)
154. Saint-Aubin-d'Arquenay (14558)
155. Saint-Aubin-sur-Mer (14562)
156. Saint-Contest (14566)
157. Sainte-Honorine-du-Fay (14592)
158. Saint-Germain-la-Blanche-Herbe (14587)
159. Saint-Germain-Langot (14588)
160. Saint-Germain-le-Vasson (14589)
161. Saint-Lambert (14602)
162. Saint-Laurent-de-Condel (14603)
163. Saint-Manvieu-Norrey (14610)
164. Saint-Martin-de-May (14408)
165. Saint-Martin-de-Mieux (14627)
166. Saint-Omer (14635)
167. Saint-Ouen-du-Mesnil-Oger (14637)
168. Saint-Pair (14640)
169. Saint-Pierre-Canivet (14646)
170. Saint-Pierre-du-Bû (14649)
171. Saint-Pierre-du-Jonquet (14651)
172. Saint-Rémy (14656)
173. Saint-Sylvain (14659)
174. Sannerville (14666)
175. Sassy (14669)
176. Soignolles (14674)
177. Soliers (14675)
178. Soulangy (14677)
179. Soumont-Saint-Quentin (14678)
180. Thaon (14685)
181. Thue et Mue (14098)
182. Thury-Harcourt-le-Hom (14689)
183. Tourville-sur-Odon (14707)
184. Tréprel (14710)
185. Troarn (14712)
186. Urville (14719)
187. Ussy (14720)
188. Vacognes-Neuilly (14721)
189. Valambray (14005)
190. Vendeuvre (14735)
191. Versainville (14737)
192. Verson (14738)
193. Le Vey (14741)
194. Vicques (14742)
195. Vieux (14747)
196. Vignats (14751)
197. Villers-Canivet (14753)
198. Villons-les-Buissons (14758)
199. Villy-lez-Falaise (14759)
200. Vimont (14761)

== History ==
The arrondissement of Caen was created in 1800. At the January 2017 reorganisation of the arrondissements of Calvados, it lost 19 communes to the arrondissement of Bayeux, 20 communes to the arrondissement of Vire and 15 communes to the arrondissement of Lisieux.

As a result of the reorganisation of the cantons of France which came into effect in 2015, the borders of the cantons are no longer related to the borders of the arrondissements. The cantons of the arrondissement of Caen were, as of January 2015:

1. Bourguébus
2. Bretteville-sur-Laize
3. Cabourg
4. Caen-1
5. Caen-2
6. Caen-3
7. Caen-4
8. Caen-7
9. Caen-8
10. Caen-9
11. Caen-10
12. Caen-Hérouville (Caen-6)
13. Creully
14. Douvres-la-Délivrande
15. Évrecy
16. Falaise-Nord
17. Falaise-Sud
18. Hérouville-Saint-Clair (Caen-5)
19. Morteaux-Couliboeuf
20. Ouistreham
21. Thury-Harcourt
22. Tilly-sur-Seulles
23. Troarn
24. Villers-Bocage
