= Ouffières =

- Commune
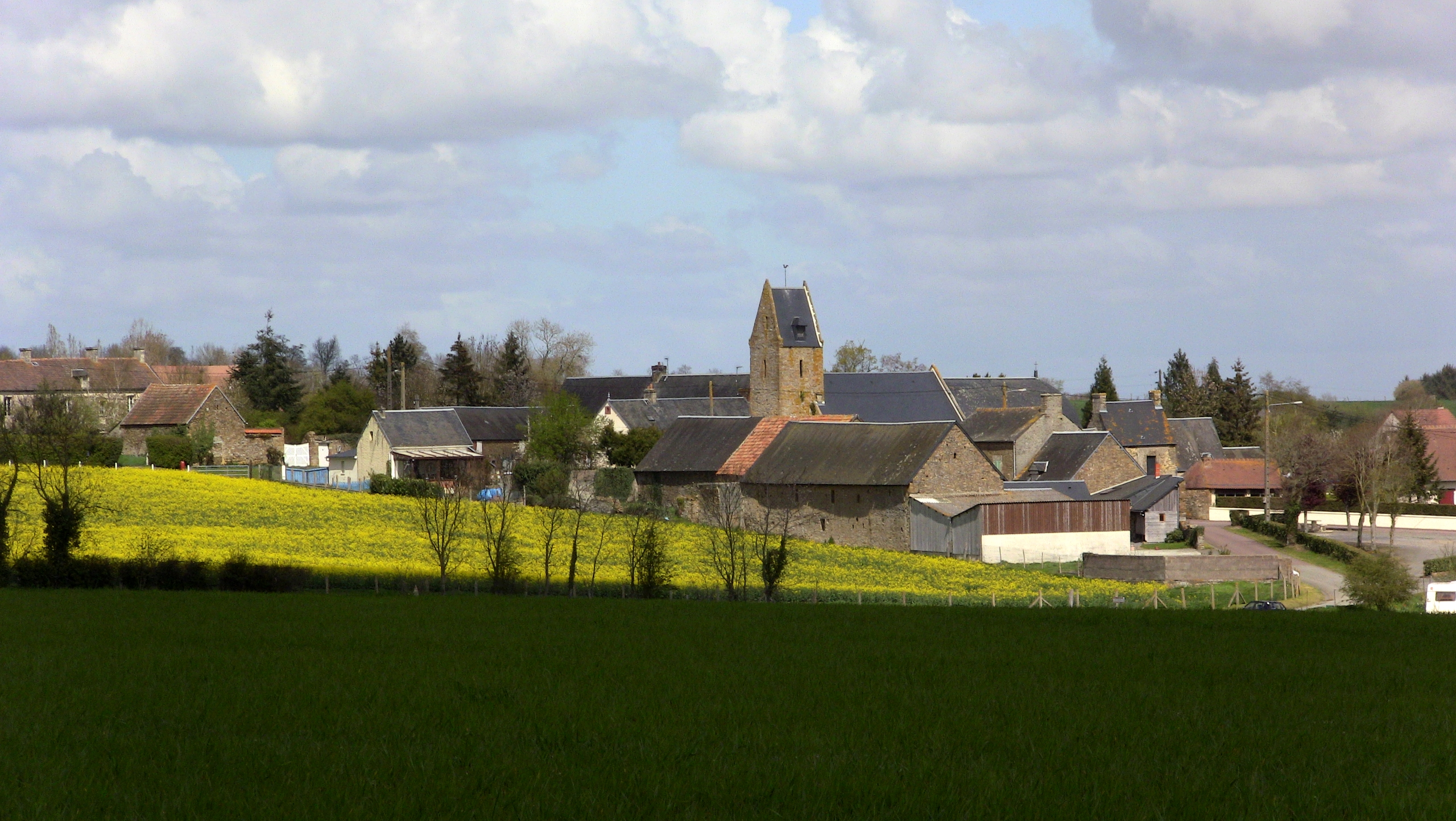
- A general view of Ouffières
- Location of Ouffières
- Location within France Location within Normandy
- Coordinates: 49°01′28″N 0°29′24″W
- Country: France
- Region: Normandy
- Department: Calvados
- Arrondissement: Caen
- Canton: Le Hom
- Intercommunality: Cingal-Suisse Normande

Government
  - Mayor (2020–2026): Benoît Chedeville
- Area^{1}: 4.21 km^{2} (1.63 sq mi)
- Elevation: 19 m (62 ft)
- Highest elevation: 182 m (597 ft)
- Lowest elevation: 15 m (49 ft)
- Population (2023): 200
  - Density: 48/km^{2} (120/sq mi)
- Time zone: UTC+01:00 (CET)
  - Summer (DST): UTC+02:00 (CEST)
- INSEE/Postal code: 14483 /14220
- ^{1} French Land Register data, which excludes lakes, ponds, glaciers > 1 km^{2} (0.386 sq mi or 247 acres) and river estuaries.

Ouffières (French pronunciation: [ufjɛʁ]) is a commune in the Calvados department in the Normandy region in northwestern France.

== Geography ==
The commune is part of the area known as Suisse Normande.

The commune is made up of the following collection of villages and hamlets, Neumer and Ouffières.

The river Orne plus six streams The Neumer, The Flagy, The Aunay Douffieres, The Trois Cours, The Pisseux and The Val de Cropton are the seven watercourses running through the commune.

== Population ==
Historical population
Year	Pop.	±% p.a.
1968	118	—
1975	109	−1.13%
1982	135	+3.10%
1990	161	+2.23%
1999	158	−0.21%
2007	181	+1.71%
2012	190	+0.98%
2017	189	−0.11%
2023	200	+0.95%
Source: INSEE

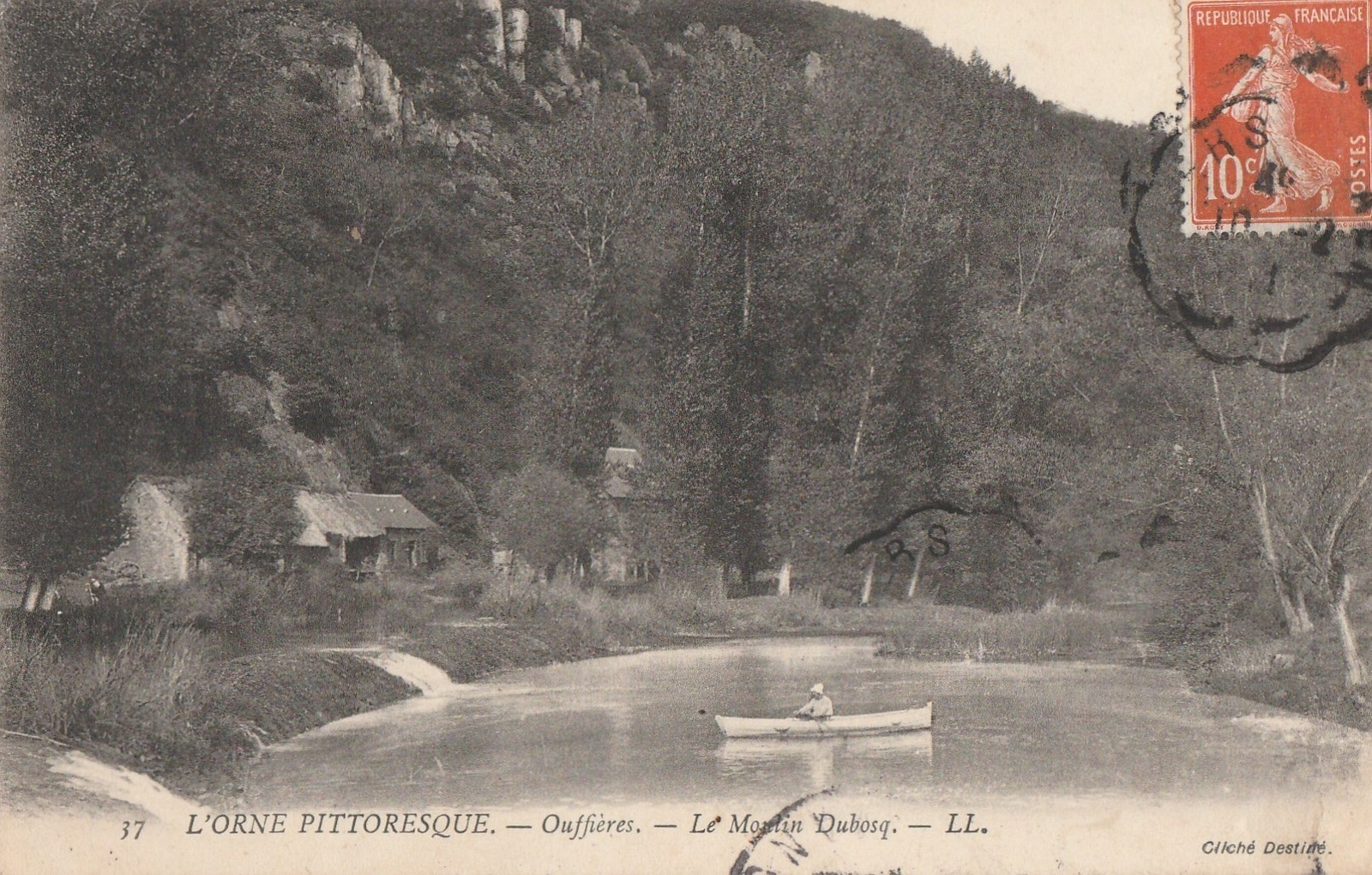
Old postcard of Ouffières

== See also ==
- Communes of the Calvados department
