= Soignolles =

- Commune
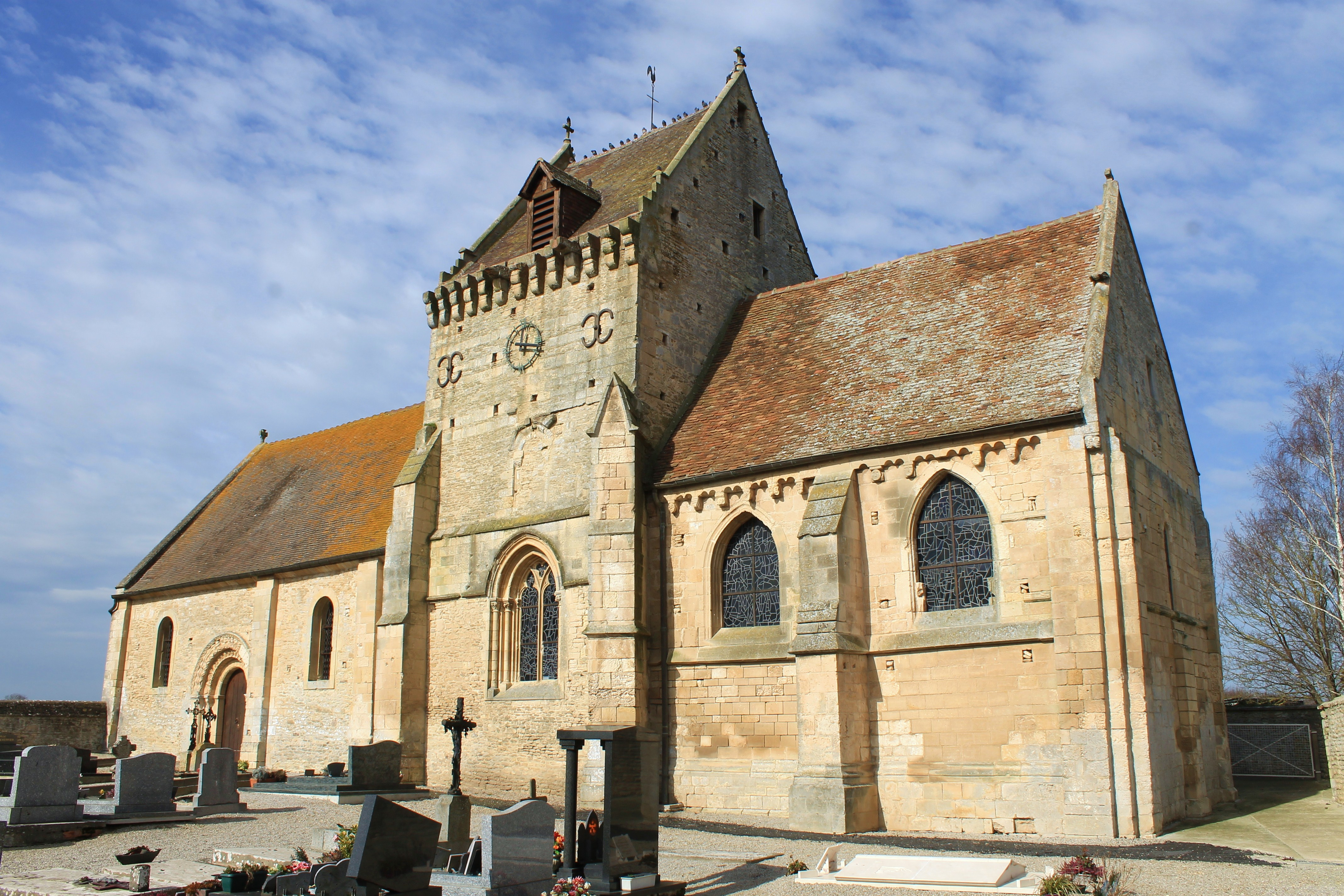
- The church in Soignolles

- Coat of arms
- Location of Soignolles
- Location within France Location within Normandy
- Coordinates: 49°01′48″N 0°12′32″W
- Country: France
- Region: Normandy
- Department: Calvados
- Arrondissement: Caen
- Canton: Le Hom
- Intercommunality: Cingal-Suisse Normande

Government
  - Mayor (2020–2026): Patricia Fieffe
- Area^{1}: 5.77 km^{2} (2.23 sq mi)
- Elevation: 77 m (253 ft)
- Highest elevation: 104 m (341 ft)
- Lowest elevation: 60 m (200 ft)
- Population (2023): 115
  - Density: 19.9/km^{2} (51.6/sq mi)
- Time zone: UTC+01:00 (CET)
  - Summer (DST): UTC+02:00 (CEST)
- INSEE/Postal code: 14674 /14190
- ^{1} French Land Register data, which excludes lakes, ponds, glaciers > 1 km^{2} (0.386 sq mi or 247 acres) and river estuaries.

Soignolles (French pronunciation: [swaɲɔl]) is a commune in the Calvados department in the Normandy region in northwestern France.

== Population ==
Historical population
Year	Pop.	±% p.a.
1968	89	—
1975	69	−3.57%
1982	74	+1.00%
1990	81	+1.14%
1999	71	−1.45%
2007	83	+1.97%
2012	122	+8.01%
2017	123	+0.16%
2023	115	−1.11%
Source: INSEE

== Points of Interest ==
=== National heritage sites ===
- Eglise Saint-Denis - a twelfth century church listed as a monument in 1928.

== See also ==
- Communes of the Calvados department
