= Fresney-le-Vieux =

- Commune
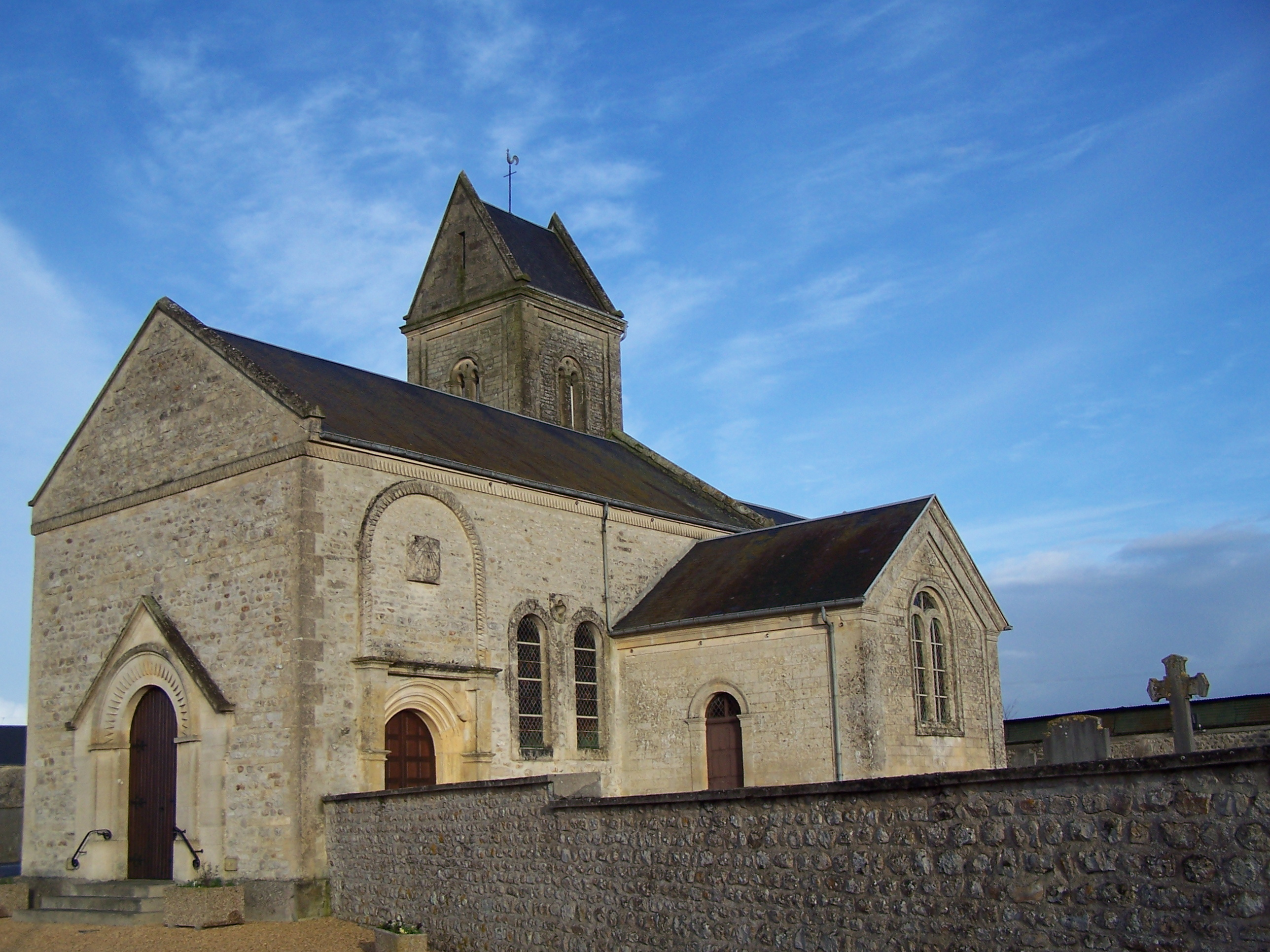
- The church in Fresney-le-Vieux
- Location of Fresney-le-Vieux
- Location within France Location within Normandy
- Coordinates: 49°00′19″N 0°23′11″W
- Country: France
- Region: Normandy
- Department: Calvados
- Arrondissement: Caen
- Canton: Le Hom
- Intercommunality: Cingal-Suisse Normande

Government
  - Mayor (2020–2026): Gilles de Col
- Area^{1}: 2.48 km^{2} (0.96 sq mi)
- Elevation: 175 m (574 ft)
- Highest elevation: 191 m (627 ft)
- Lowest elevation: 167 m (548 ft)
- Population (2023): 331
  - Density: 133/km^{2} (346/sq mi)
- Time zone: UTC+01:00 (CET)
  - Summer (DST): UTC+02:00 (CEST)
- INSEE/Postal code: 14291 /14220
- ^{1} French Land Register data, which excludes lakes, ponds, glaciers > 1 km^{2} (0.386 sq mi or 247 acres) and river estuaries.

Fresney-le-Vieux (French pronunciation: [fʁɛnɛ lə vjø]) is a commune in the Calvados department in the Normandy region in northwestern France.

== Geography ==
The commune is made up of the following collection of villages and hamlets, Le Mesnil Saulce and Fresney-le-Vieux.

The commune borders the area known as Suisse Normande.

Climate data for Fresney le Vieu (1991-2020 averages)
Month	Jan	Feb	Mar	Apr	May	Jun	Jul	Aug	Sep	Oct	Nov	Dec	Year
Record high °C (°F)	15.4 (59.7)	21.1 (70.0)	22.3 (72.1)	26.9 (80.4)	29.8 (85.6)	34.8 (94.6)	38.5 (101.3)	37.9 (100.2)	32.4 (90.3)	28.0 (82.4)	21.7 (71.1)	16.2 (61.2)	38.5 (101.3)
Mean daily maximum °C (°F)	7.5 (45.5)	8.4 (47.1)	11.3 (52.3)	14.2 (57.6)	17.4 (63.3)	20.5 (68.9)	22.8 (73.0)	22.9 (73.2)	20.0 (68.0)	15.5 (59.9)	11.0 (51.8)	8.1 (46.6)	15.0 (59.0)
Daily mean °C (°F)	4.8 (40.6)	5.1 (41.2)	7.3 (45.1)	9.4 (48.9)	12.5 (54.5)	15.4 (59.7)	17.5 (63.5)	17.6 (63.7)	14.9 (58.8)	11.7 (53.1)	7.9 (46.2)	5.3 (41.5)	10.8 (51.4)
Mean daily minimum °C (°F)	2.1 (35.8)	1.9 (35.4)	3.4 (38.1)	4.6 (40.3)	7.7 (45.9)	10.4 (50.7)	12.2 (54.0)	12.3 (54.1)	9.9 (49.8)	7.9 (46.2)	4.8 (40.6)	2.6 (36.7)	6.7 (44.1)
Record low °C (°F)	−13.5 (7.7)	−13.0 (8.6)	−9.0 (15.8)	−4.6 (23.7)	−1.0 (30.2)	1.4 (34.5)	5.0 (41.0)	4.5 (40.1)	1.0 (33.8)	−5.5 (22.1)	−7.1 (19.2)	−10.2 (13.6)	−13.5 (7.7)
Average precipitation mm (inches)	75.3 (2.96)	56.9 (2.24)	56.1 (2.21)	58.2 (2.29)	67.6 (2.66)	59.1 (2.33)	53.4 (2.10)	66.1 (2.60)	64.6 (2.54)	87.9 (3.46)	85.1 (3.35)	96.0 (3.78)	826.3 (32.53)
Average precipitation days (≥ 1.0 mm)	13.4	12.1	10.3	10.3	10.1	8.6	8.6	9.2	9.5	12.9	14.0	14.7	133.6
Source: Meteociel

== Population ==
Historical population
Year	Pop.	±% p.a.
1968	174	—
1975	175	+0.08%
1982	242	+4.74%
1990	210	−1.76%
1999	209	−0.05%
2007	271	+3.30%
2012	278	+0.51%
2017	272	−0.44%
2023	331	+3.33%
Source: INSEE

== See also ==
- Communes of the Calvados department
