= Martainville, Calvados =

Martainville
- Commune
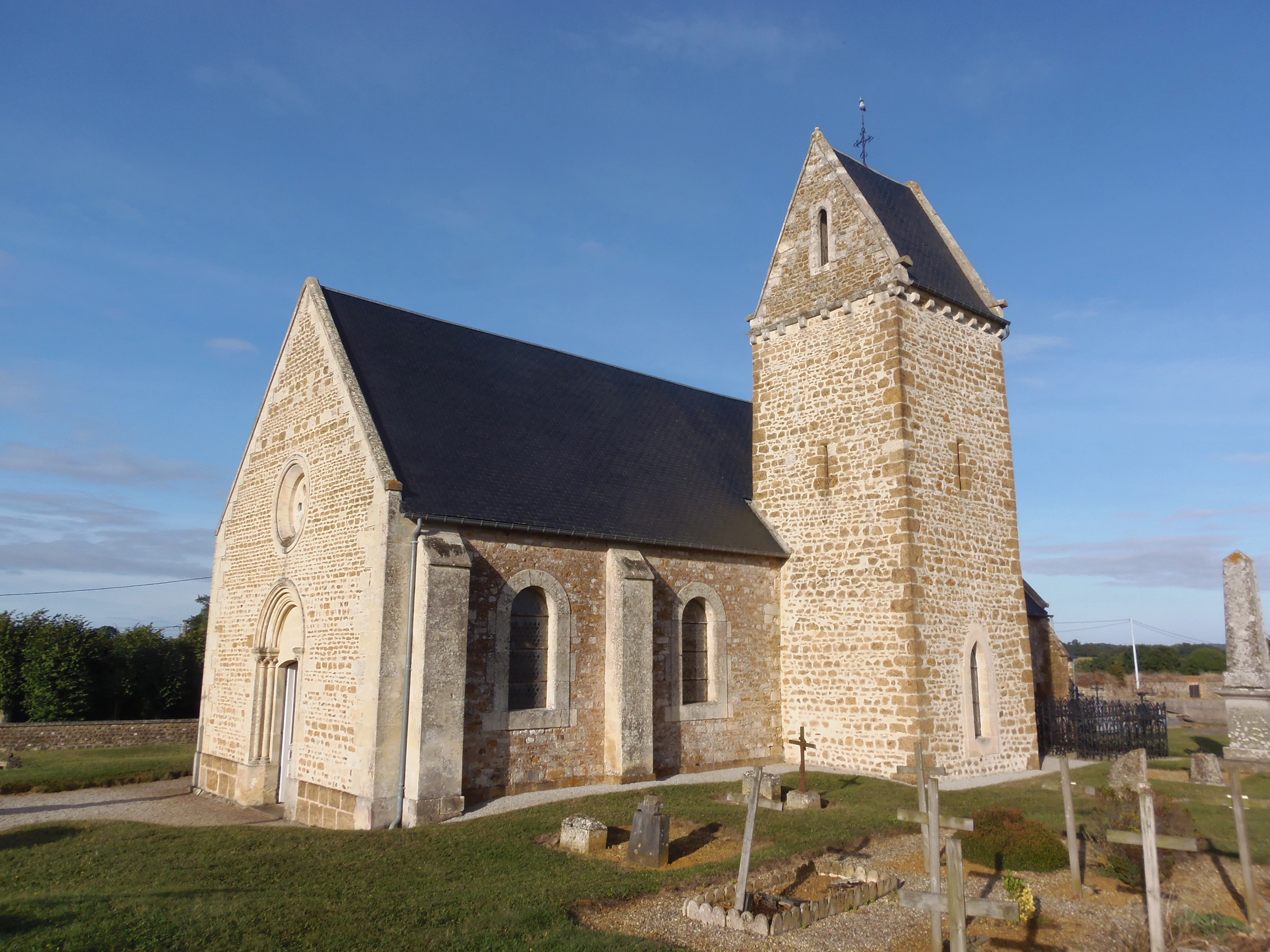
- The church in Martainville

- Coat of arms
- Location of Martainville
- Location within France Location within Normandy
- Coordinates: 48°57′12″N 0°21′18″W
- Country: France
- Region: Normandy
- Department: Calvados
- Arrondissement: Caen
- Canton: Le Hom
- Intercommunality: Cingal-Suisse Normande

Government
  - Mayor (2020–2026): Guy Anne
- Area^{1}: 5.84 km^{2} (2.25 sq mi)
- Elevation: 210 m (690 ft)
- Highest elevation: 227 m (745 ft)
- Lowest elevation: 144 m (472 ft)
- Population (2023): 116
  - Density: 19.9/km^{2} (51.4/sq mi)
- Time zone: UTC+01:00 (CET)
  - Summer (DST): UTC+02:00 (CEST)
- INSEE/Postal code: 14404 /14220
- ^{1} French Land Register data, which excludes lakes, ponds, glaciers > 1 km^{2} (0.386 sq mi or 247 acres) and river estuaries.

Martainville is a commune in the Calvados department in the Normandy region in northwestern France.

== Geography ==
The commune is part of the area known as Suisse Normande.

The commune is made up of the following collection of villages and hamlets, Le Haut de Martainville, L'Église, La Rabotière and Martainville.

Three streams The Martainville, The Trois Minettes, and The Grand Etang are the three watercourses running through the commune.

== Population ==
Historical population
Year	Pop.	±% p.a.
1968	94	—
1975	89	−0.78%
1982	78	−1.87%
1990	96	+2.63%
1999	96	+0.00%
2007	98	+0.26%
2012	108	+1.96%
2017	119	+1.96%
2023	116	−0.42%
Source: INSEE

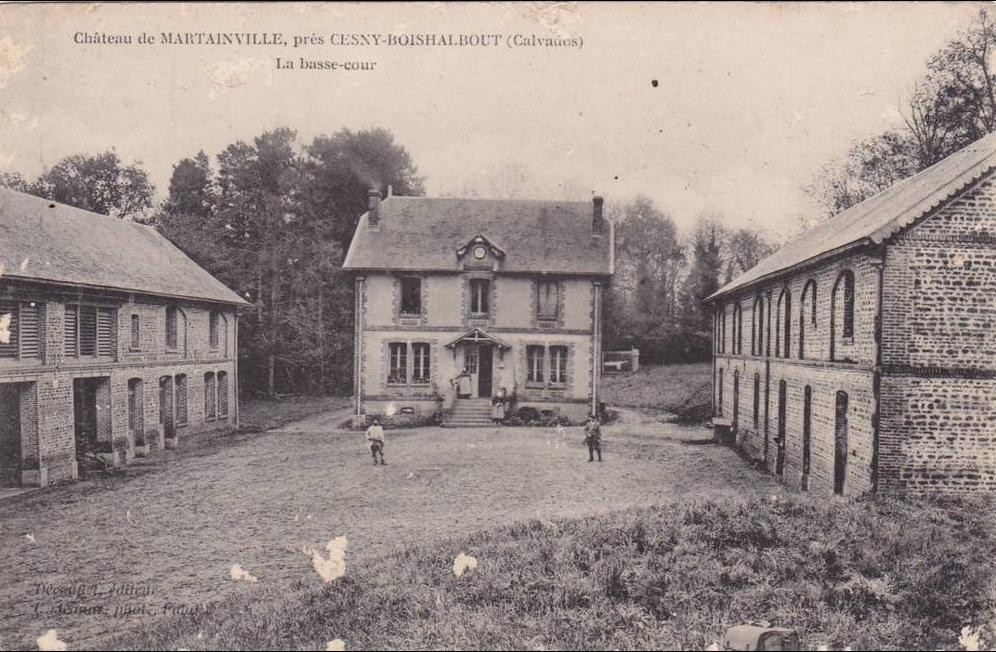
Chateau de Martianville by Cessny-Boishalbout - old postcard

== See also ==
- Communes of the Calvados department
