= Saint-Germain-le-Vasson =

- Commune
- Town hall
- Location of Saint-Germain-le-Vasson
- Location within France Location within Normandy
- Coordinates: 49°00′13″N 0°17′58″W
- Country: France
- Region: Normandy
- Department: Calvados
- Arrondissement: Caen
- Canton: Le Hom
- Intercommunality: Cingal-Suisse Normande

Government
  - Mayor (2024–2026): Julien Lemoux
- Area^{1}: 9.41 km^{2} (3.63 sq mi)
- Elevation: 163 m (535 ft)
- Highest elevation: 192 m (630 ft)
- Lowest elevation: 75 m (246 ft)
- Population (2023): 966
  - Density: 103/km^{2} (266/sq mi)
- Time zone: UTC+01:00 (CET)
  - Summer (DST): UTC+02:00 (CEST)
- INSEE/Postal code: 14589 /14190
- ^{1} French Land Register data, which excludes lakes, ponds, glaciers > 1 km^{2} (0.386 sq mi or 247 acres) and river estuaries.

Saint-Germain-le-Vasson (French pronunciation: [sɛ̃ ʒɛʁmɛ̃ lə vasɔ̃]) is a commune in the Calvados department in the Normandy region in northwestern France.

== Geography ==
The commune is made up of the following collection of villages and hamlets, Cité du Livet, La Londe, Roussin, La Fontaine and Saint-Germain.

The river Laize, a tributary to the Orne, flows through the commune.

== Population ==
Historical population
Year	Pop.	±% p.a.
1968	818	—
1975	839	+0.36%
1982	796	−0.75%
1990	880	+1.26%
1999	935	+0.68%
2007	901	−0.46%
2012	971	+1.51%
2017	937	−0.71%
2023	966	+0.51%
Source: INSEE

== Points of Interest ==
=== Museums ===
- Musée de la mine de fer livet a museum dedicated to showcasing the last Iron ore mine in Western France, that operated here until 1989. The museum has been opened since 1998.

=== National Heritage sites ===
The Commune has two buildings and areas listed as a Monument historique

- Église Saint-Germain fourteenth century church listed as a monument in 1928.
- Roche Piquée a Neolithic Menhir listed as a monument in 1951.

== See also ==
- Communes of the Calvados department
