= Espins =

- Commune
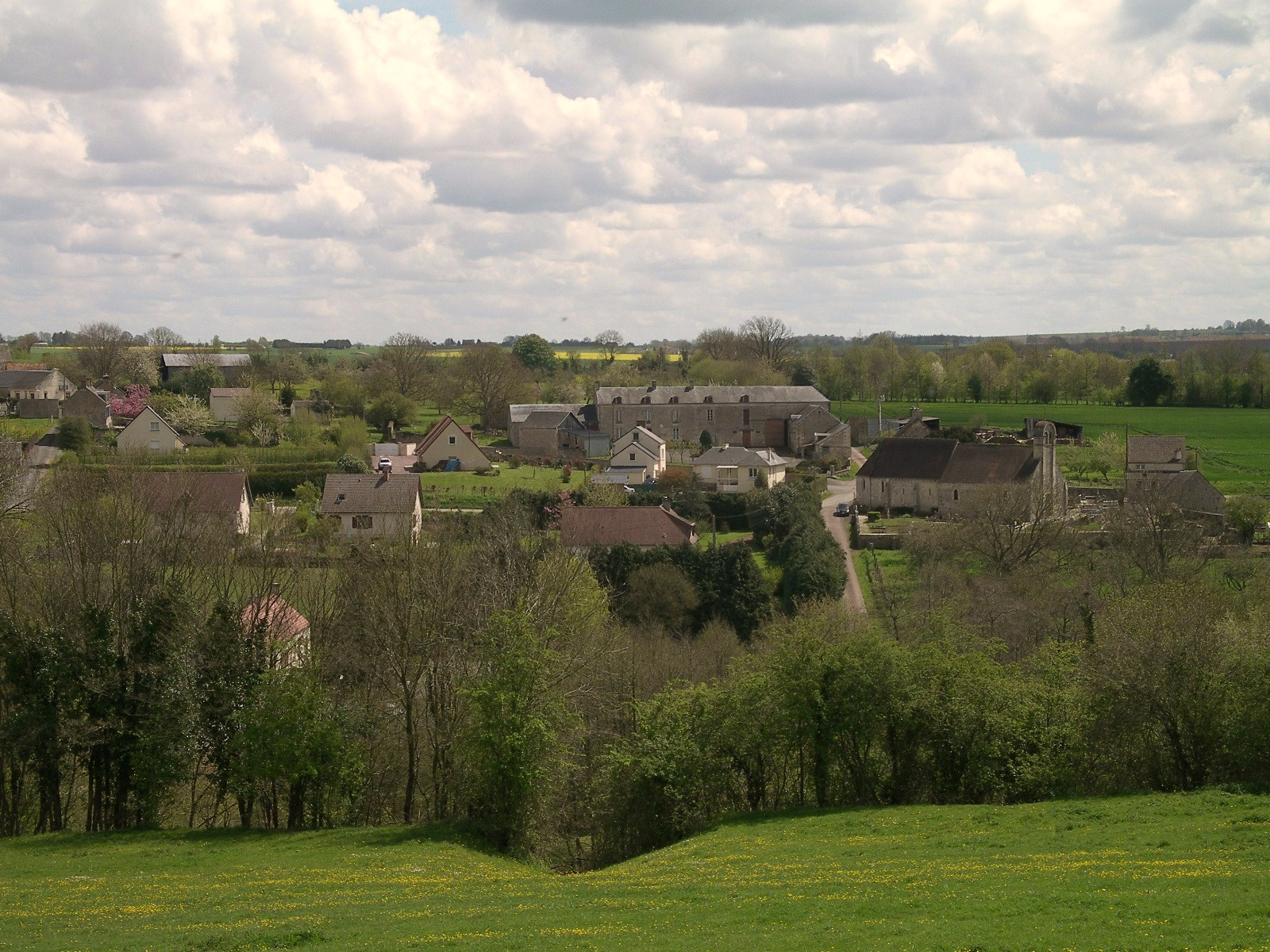
- A general view of Espins

- Coat of arms
- Location of Espins
- Location within France Location within Normandy
- Coordinates: 49°00′06″N 0°24′40″W
- Country: France
- Region: Normandy
- Department: Calvados
- Arrondissement: Caen
- Canton: Le Hom
- Intercommunality: Cingal-Suisse Normande

Government
  - Mayor (2020–2026): Françoise Haugou
- Area^{1}: 4.58 km^{2} (1.77 sq mi)
- Elevation: 150 m (490 ft)
- Highest elevation: 186 m (610 ft)
- Lowest elevation: 90 m (300 ft)
- Population (2023): 244
  - Density: 53.3/km^{2} (138/sq mi)
- Time zone: UTC+01:00 (CET)
  - Summer (DST): UTC+02:00 (CEST)
- INSEE/Postal code: 14248 /14220
- ^{1} French Land Register data, which excludes lakes, ponds, glaciers > 1 km^{2} (0.386 sq mi or 247 acres) and river estuaries.

Espins (French pronunciation: [epɛ̃]) is a commune in the Calvados department in the Normandy region in northwestern France.

== Geography ==
The commune is part of the area known as Suisse Normande.

The commune is made up of the following collection of villages and hamlets, Le Bas d'Espins, Le Moncel and Espins.

The Traspy stream is the only watercourse running through the commune.

== Demography ==
Historical population
Year	Pop.	±% p.a.
1968	158	—
1975	119	−3.97%
1982	175	+5.66%
1990	199	+1.62%
1999	229	+1.57%
2007	229	+0.00%
2012	217	−1.07%
2017	245	+2.46%
2023	244	−0.07%
Source: INSEE

== Points of interest ==
=== National heritage sites ===
- Ferme de Foudenpant is the former manor of the Val Richer abbey, built in the fourteenth century it was listed as a monument in 1995.

== See also ==
- Communes of the Calvados department
