= Grimbosq =

- Commune
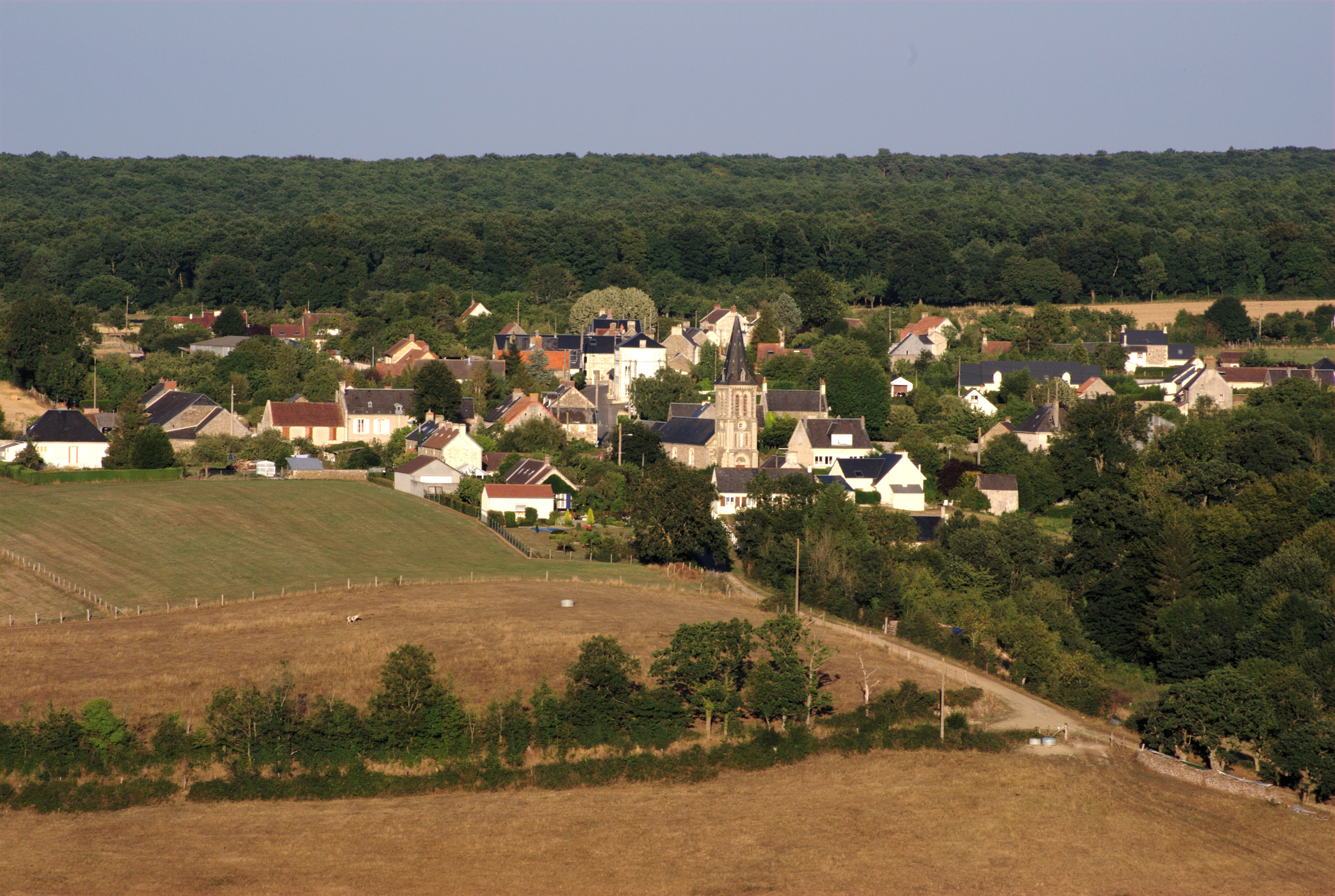
- A general view of Grimbosq

- Coat of arms
- Location of Grimbosq
- Location within France Location within Normandy
- Coordinates: 49°02′40″N 0°27′02″W
- Country: France
- Region: Normandy
- Department: Calvados
- Arrondissement: Caen
- Canton: Le Hom
- Intercommunality: Cingal-Suisse Normande

Government
  - Mayor (2020–2026): Gilles Bunel
- Area^{1}: 8.63 km^{2} (3.33 sq mi)
- Elevation: 57 m (187 ft)
- Highest elevation: 142 m (466 ft)
- Lowest elevation: 8 m (26 ft)
- Population (2023): 286
  - Density: 33.1/km^{2} (85.8/sq mi)
- Time zone: UTC+01:00 (CET)
  - Summer (DST): UTC+02:00 (CEST)
- INSEE/Postal code: 14320 /14220
- ^{1} French Land Register data, which excludes lakes, ponds, glaciers > 1 km^{2} (0.386 sq mi or 247 acres) and river estuaries.

Grimbosq (French pronunciation: [ɡʁɛ̃bo]) is a commune in the Calvados department in the Normandy region in northwestern France.

== Geography ==
The commune is part of the area known as Suisse Normande.

The commune is made up of the following collection of villages and hamlets, Le Vieux Grimbosq, and Grimbosq.

The river Orne plus six streams The Coupe-Gorge, la Petite Vallee, La Planquette, The Flagy, La Vallee Fermante and La Grande Vallee are the four watercourses running through the commune.

== Population ==
Historical population
Year	Pop.	±% p.a.
1968	193	—
1975	184	−0.68%
1982	283	+6.34%
1990	285	+0.09%
1999	302	+0.65%
2007	280	−0.94%
2012	283	+0.21%
2017	287	+0.28%
2023	286	−0.06%
Source: INSEE

== Points of interest ==
- Grimbosq Woods is 482 hectare site featuring two Arboretums and an 8.5 hectare animal park, featuring several species of deer and Wild boar.

=== National heritage sites ===
- Château d'Olivet is the remains of an eleventh century feudal mound which was listed as a Monument historique in 1988.

== See also ==
- Communes of the Calvados department
