= Cauvicourt =

- Commune
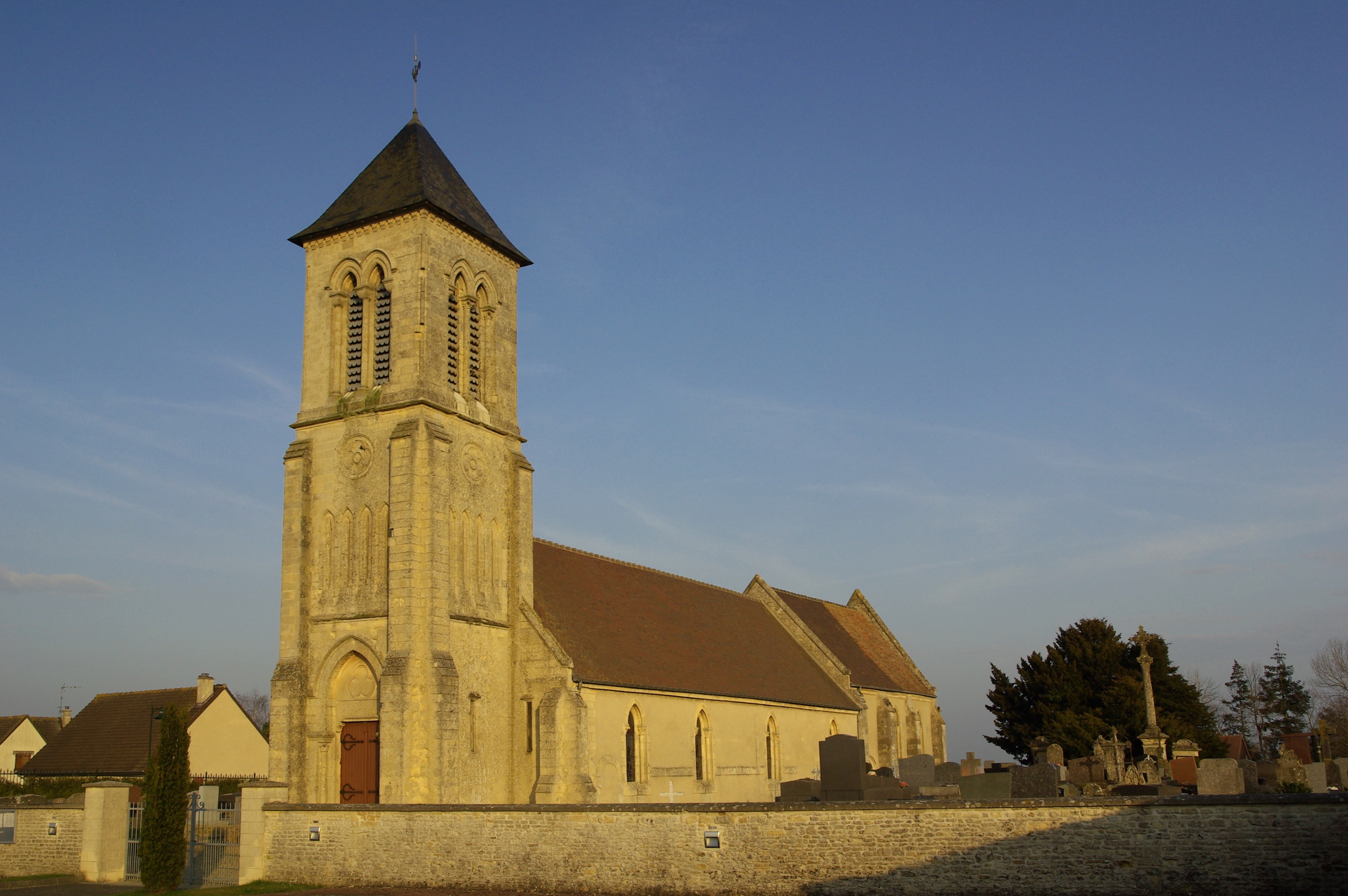
- The church in Cauvicourt
- Location of Cauvicourt
- Location within France Location within Normandy
- Coordinates: 49°02′51″N 0°15′45″W
- Country: France
- Region: Normandy
- Department: Calvados
- Arrondissement: Caen
- Canton: Le Hom
- Intercommunality: Cingal-Suisse Normande

Government
  - Mayor (2020–2026): Vanessa Dupuy
- Area^{1}: 9.62 km^{2} (3.71 sq mi)
- Elevation: 100 m (330 ft)
- Highest elevation: 133 m (436 ft)
- Lowest elevation: 55 m (180 ft)
- Population (2023): 564
  - Density: 58.6/km^{2} (152/sq mi)
- Time zone: UTC+01:00 (CET)
  - Summer (DST): UTC+02:00 (CEST)
- INSEE/Postal code: 14145 /14190
- ^{1} French Land Register data, which excludes lakes, ponds, glaciers > 1 km^{2} (0.386 sq mi or 247 acres) and river estuaries.

Cauvicourt (French pronunciation: [kovikuʁ]) is a commune in the Calvados department and Normandy region of north-western France.

== Geography ==
The commune is made up of the following collection of villages and hamlets, Haut Mesnil and Cauvicourt.

== Population ==
Historical population
Year	Pop.	±% p.a.
1968	263	—
1975	302	+1.99%
1982	312	+0.47%
1990	373	+2.26%
1999	367	−0.18%
2007	420	+1.70%
2012	453	+1.52%
2017	507	+2.28%
2023	564	+1.79%
Source: INSEE

== Points of Interest ==
=== National Heritage sites ===
- Eglise Saint-Germain thirteenth century church listed as a Monument historique in 1927.

== See also ==
- Communes of the Calvados department
