= Meslay, Calvados =

Meslay
- Commune
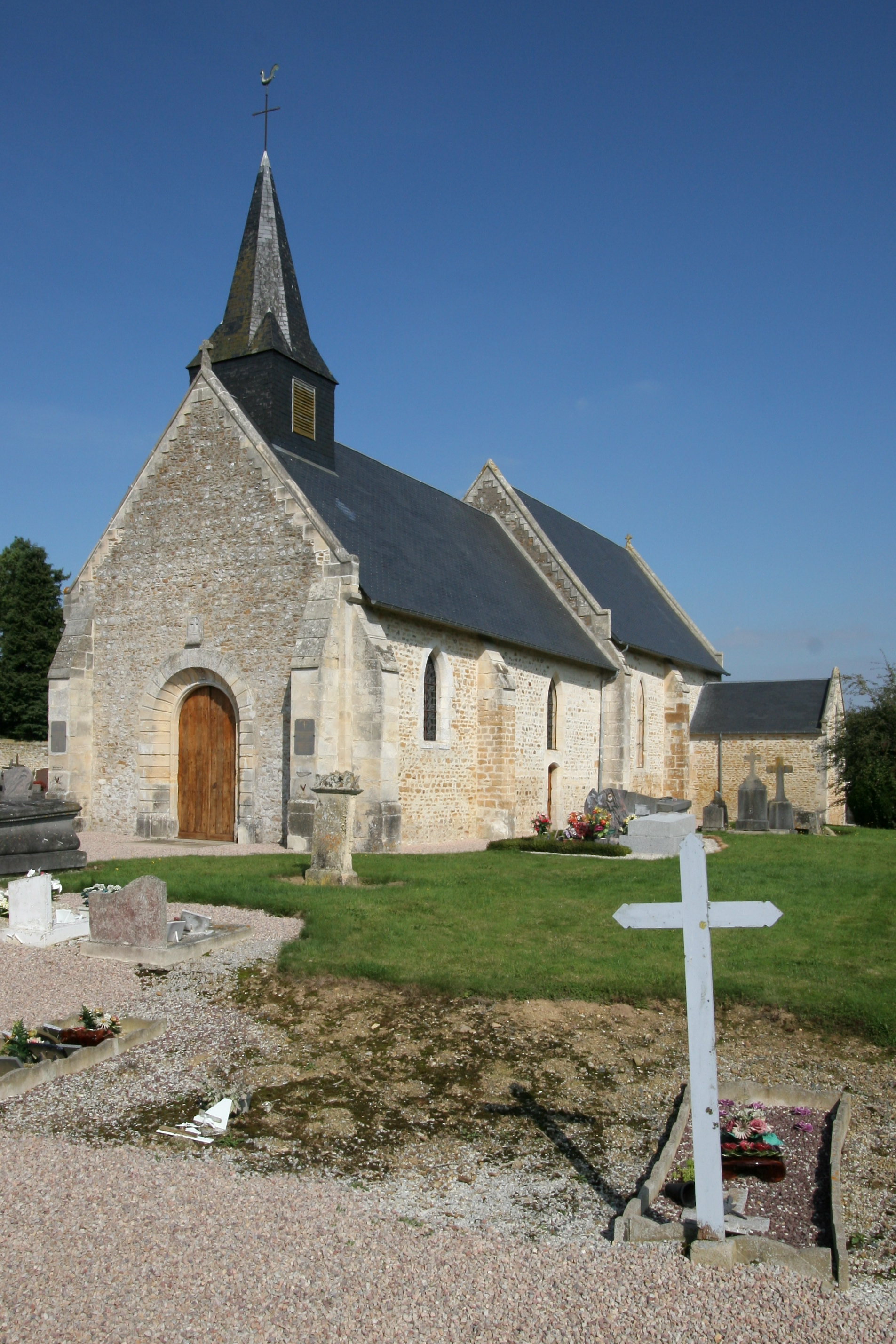
- The church in Meslay
- Location of Meslay
- Location within France Location within Normandy
- Coordinates: 48°57′24″N 0°23′43″W
- Country: France
- Region: Normandy
- Department: Calvados
- Arrondissement: Caen
- Canton: Le Hom
- Intercommunality: Cingal-Suisse Normande

Government
  - Mayor (2020–2026): Christian de Courseulles
- Area^{1}: 5.69 km^{2} (2.20 sq mi)
- Elevation: 180 m (590 ft)
- Highest elevation: 240 m (790 ft)
- Lowest elevation: 155 m (509 ft)
- Population (2023): 338
  - Density: 59.4/km^{2} (154/sq mi)
- Time zone: UTC+01:00 (CET)
  - Summer (DST): UTC+02:00 (CEST)
- INSEE/Postal code: 14411 /14220
- ^{1} French Land Register data, which excludes lakes, ponds, glaciers > 1 km^{2} (0.386 sq mi or 247 acres) and river estuaries.

Meslay (French pronunciation: [mɛlɛ]) is a commune in the Calvados department in the Normandy region in northwestern France.

== Geography ==
The commune is part of the area known as Suisse Normande.

The commune is made up of the following collection of villages and hamlets, Le Buisson, La Vallée, L'Aître Cher, Les Brosses and Meslay.

Three streams The Bactot, The Trois Monts, and La Vieille Maison are the three watercourses running through the commune.

== Population ==
Historical population
Year	Pop.	±% p.a.
1968	196	—
1975	187	−0.67%
1982	193	+0.45%
1990	208	+0.94%
1999	195	−0.71%
2007	229	+2.03%
2012	231	+0.17%
2017	292	+4.80%
2023	338	+2.47%
Source: INSEE

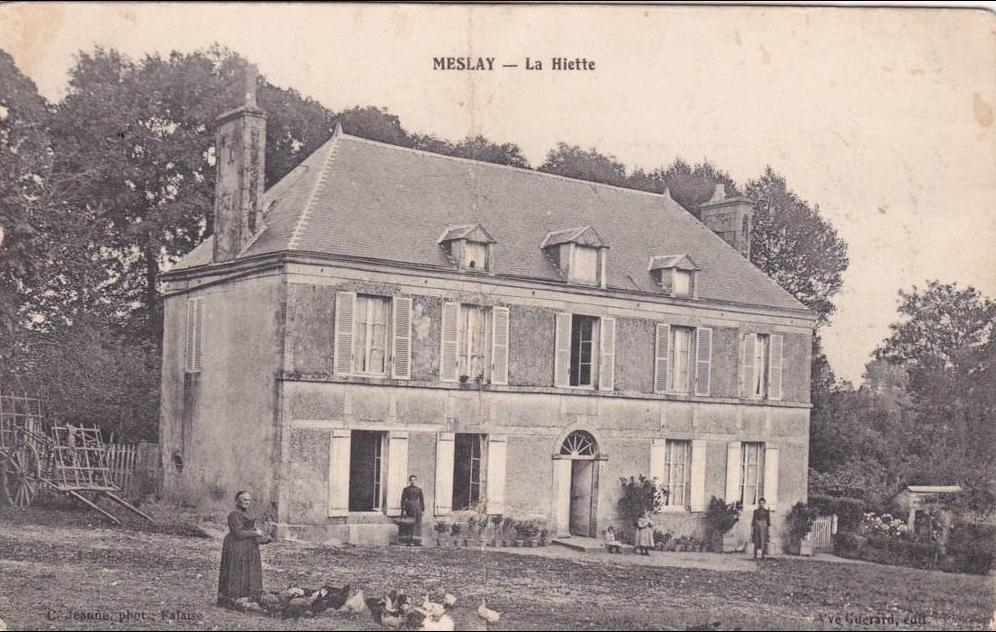
Old Postcard from Meslay Calvados

== See also ==
- Communes of the Calvados department
