= Culey-le-Patry =

- Commune
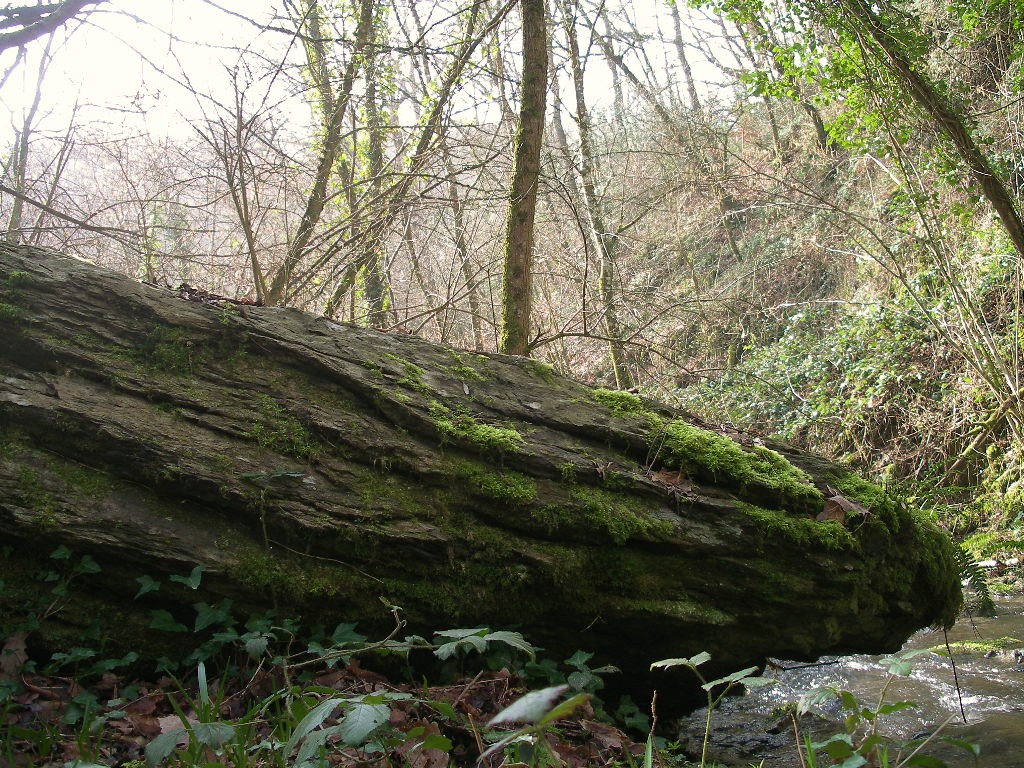
- La Belle Roche menhir

- Coat of arms
- Location of Culey-le-Patry
- Location within France Location within Normandy
- Coordinates: 48°57′07″N 0°31′46″W
- Country: France
- Region: Normandy
- Department: Calvados
- Arrondissement: Caen
- Canton: Le Hom
- Intercommunality: Cingal-Suisse Normande

Government
  - Mayor (2020–2026): Marie-Christine Danlos
- Area^{1}: 7.81 km^{2} (3.02 sq mi)
- Elevation: 250 m (820 ft)
- Highest elevation: 277 m (909 ft)
- Lowest elevation: 27 m (89 ft)
- Population (2023): 384
  - Density: 49.2/km^{2} (127/sq mi)
- Time zone: UTC+01:00 (CET)
  - Summer (DST): UTC+02:00 (CEST)
- INSEE/Postal code: 14211 /14220
- ^{1} French Land Register data, which excludes lakes, ponds, glaciers > 1 km^{2} (0.386 sq mi or 247 acres) and river estuaries.

Culey-le-Patry (French pronunciation: [kylɛ lə patʁi]) is a commune in the Calvados department in the Normandy region in northwestern France.

== Geography ==
The commune is part of the area known as Suisse Normande.

The commune is made up of the following collection of villages and hamlets, La Tuaudière, Mélogis, Meslier, La Vigne, Carcanet, La Trufaudière, La Cour, Le Pont, Les Caumettes and Culey-le-Patry.

The river Orne plus two streams La Vignonniere and The Herbion are the three watercourses that flow through the commune.

== Population ==
Historical population
Year	Pop.	±% p.a.
1968	313	—
1975	293	−0.94%
1982	314	+0.99%
1990	300	−0.57%
1999	319	+0.68%
2007	335	+0.61%
2012	349	+0.82%
2017	357	+0.45%
2023	384	+1.22%
Source: INSEE

== Points of interest ==
=== National heritage sites ===
- La Belle Roche a Neolithic Menhir registered as a Monument historique in 1954.

== See also ==
- Communes of the Calvados department
