= Le Bû-sur-Rouvres =

- Commune
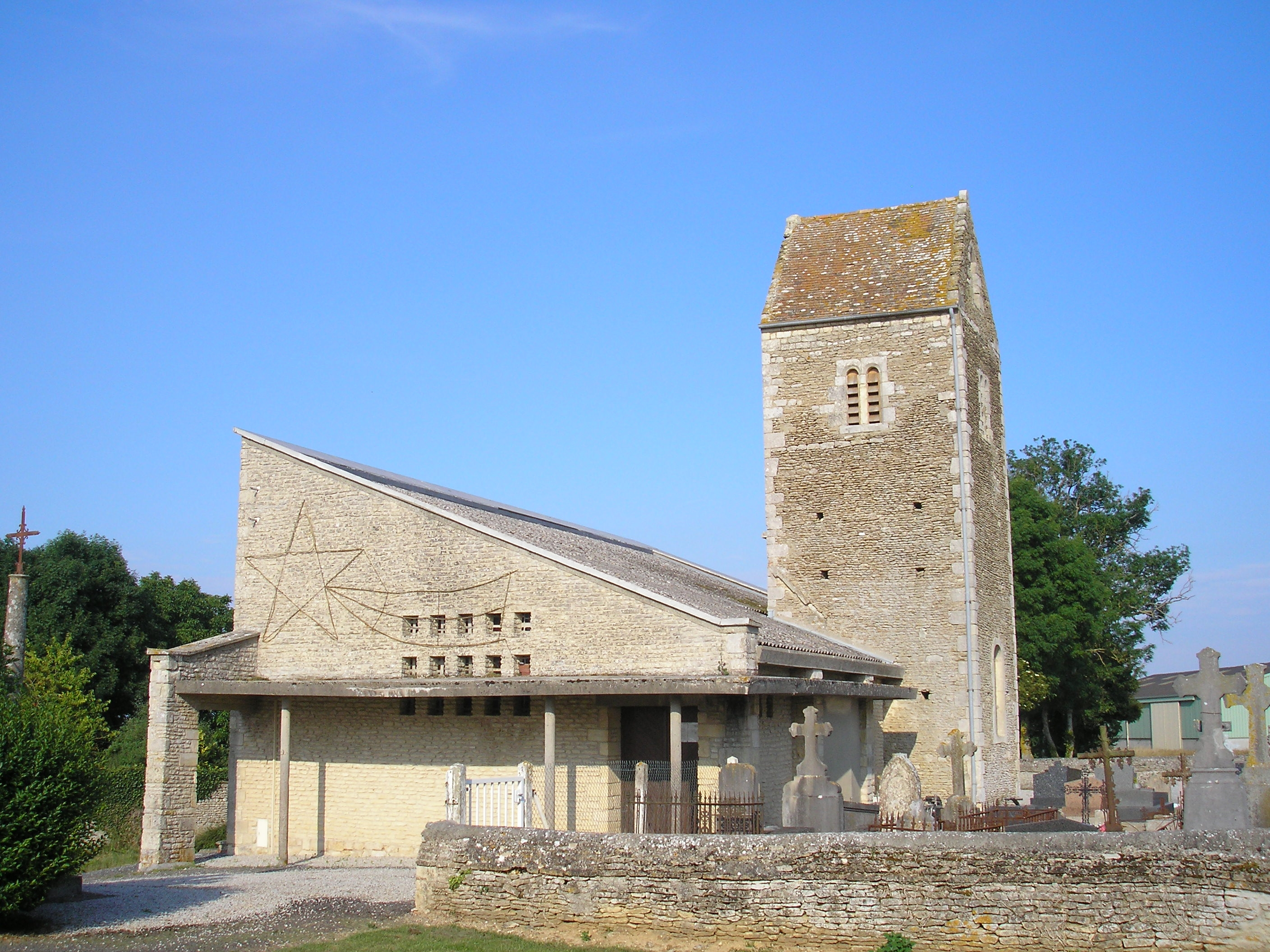
- The church in Le Bû-sur-Rouvres
- Location of Le Bû-sur-Rouvres
- Location within France Location within Normandy
- Coordinates: 49°02′03″N 0°10′44″W
- Country: France
- Region: Normandy
- Department: Calvados
- Arrondissement: Caen
- Canton: Le Hom
- Intercommunality: Cingal-Suisse Normande

Government
  - Mayor (2020–2026): Yves Ledent
- Area^{1}: 2.83 km^{2} (1.09 sq mi)
- Elevation: 80 m (260 ft)
- Highest elevation: 94 m (308 ft)
- Lowest elevation: 71 m (233 ft)
- Population (2023): 119
  - Density: 42.0/km^{2} (109/sq mi)
- Time zone: UTC+01:00 (CET)
  - Summer (DST): UTC+02:00 (CEST)
- INSEE/Postal code: 14116 /14190
- ^{1} French Land Register data, which excludes lakes, ponds, glaciers > 1 km^{2} (0.386 sq mi or 247 acres) and river estuaries.

Le Bû-sur-Rouvres (French pronunciation: [lə by syʁ ʁuvʁ], literally Le Bû on Rouvres) is a commune in the Calvados department in the Normandy region in northwestern France.

== Population ==
Historical population
Year	Pop.	±% p.a.
1968	100	—
1975	90	−1.49%
1982	87	−0.48%
1990	85	−0.29%
1999	81	−0.53%
2007	100	+2.67%
2012	120	+3.71%
2017	100	−3.58%
2023	119	+2.94%
Source: INSEE

== See also ==
- Communes of the Calvados department
