= La Pommeraye, Calvados =

La Pommeraye
- Commune
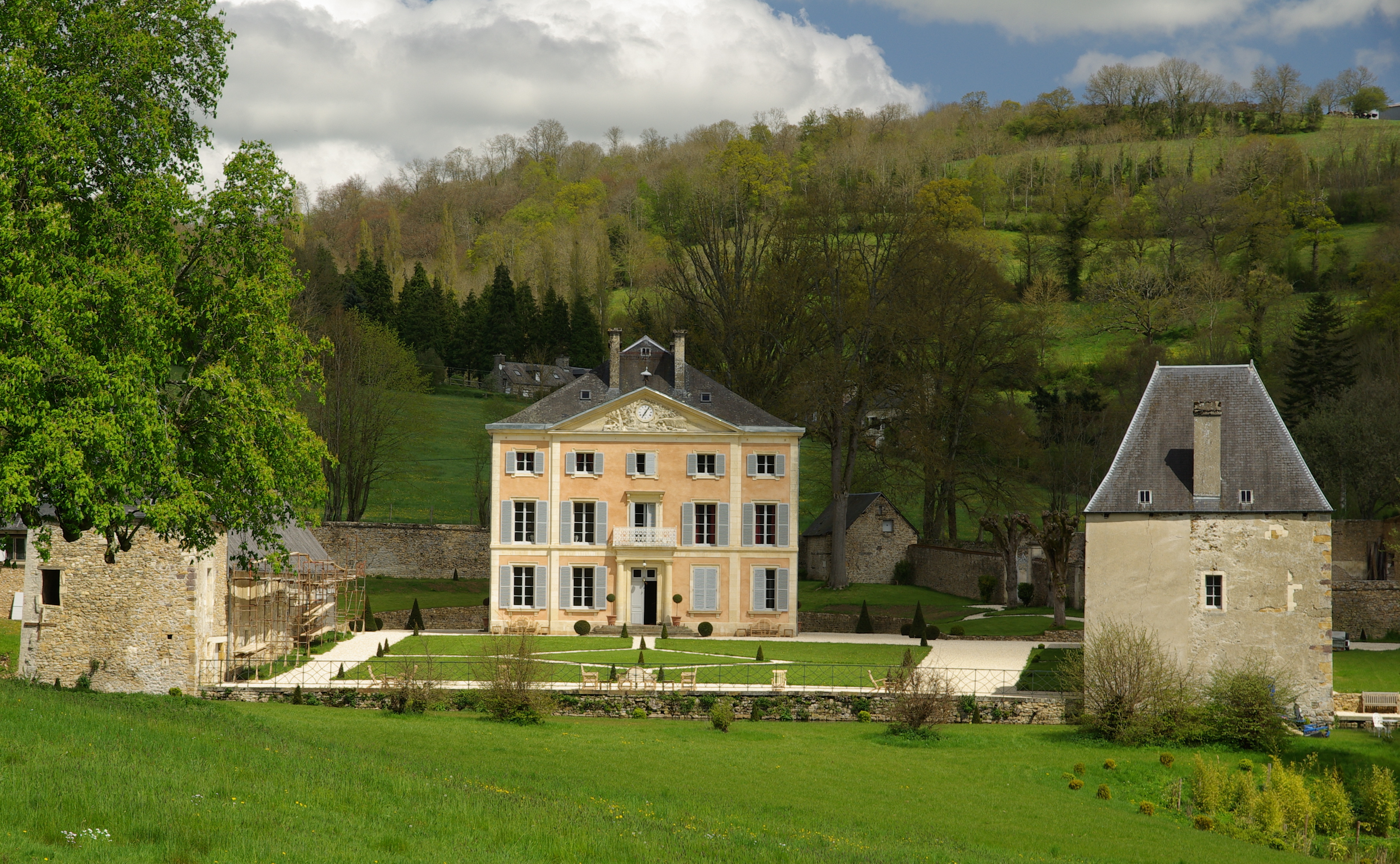
- Chateau
- Location of La Pommeraye
- Location within France Location within Normandy
- Coordinates: 48°54′33″N 0°25′13″W
- Country: France
- Region: Normandy
- Department: Calvados
- Arrondissement: Caen
- Canton: Le Hom
- Intercommunality: Cingal-Suisse Normande

Government
  - Mayor (2020–2026): Clémentine Mouchel
- Area^{1}: 2.80 km^{2} (1.08 sq mi)
- Elevation: 306 m (1,004 ft)
- Highest elevation: 294 m (965 ft)
- Lowest elevation: 117 m (384 ft)
- Population (2023): 66
  - Density: 24/km^{2} (61/sq mi)
- Time zone: UTC+01:00 (CET)
  - Summer (DST): UTC+02:00 (CEST)
- INSEE/Postal code: 14510 /14690
- ^{1} French Land Register data, which excludes lakes, ponds, glaciers > 1 km^{2} (0.386 sq mi or 247 acres) and river estuaries.

La Pommeraye (French pronunciation: [la pɔmʁɛ]) is a commune in the Calvados department in the Normandy region in northwestern France.

== Geography ==
The commune is part of the area known as Suisse Normande.

The commune is made up of the following collection of villages and hamlets, La Guérardière and La Pommeraye.

The commune has a single watercourse running through its borders, The Orival stream.

== Population ==
Historical population
Year	Pop.	±% p.a.
1968	74	—
1975	57	−3.66%
1982	56	−0.25%
1990	49	−1.66%
1999	51	+0.45%
2007	38	−3.61%
2012	50	+5.64%
2017	56	+2.29%
2023	66	+2.78%
Source: INSEE

== Points of interest ==
- Théâtre équestre de la Pommeraye is a theatre that has been open since 2018 which is dedicated to mixing performing arts with equestrian arts.

=== National heritage sites ===
- Château Ganne is the remains of an eleventh century castle, that was listed as a Monument historique in 2000.

== See also ==
- Communes of the Calvados department
