= Donnay, Calvados =

Donnay
- Commune
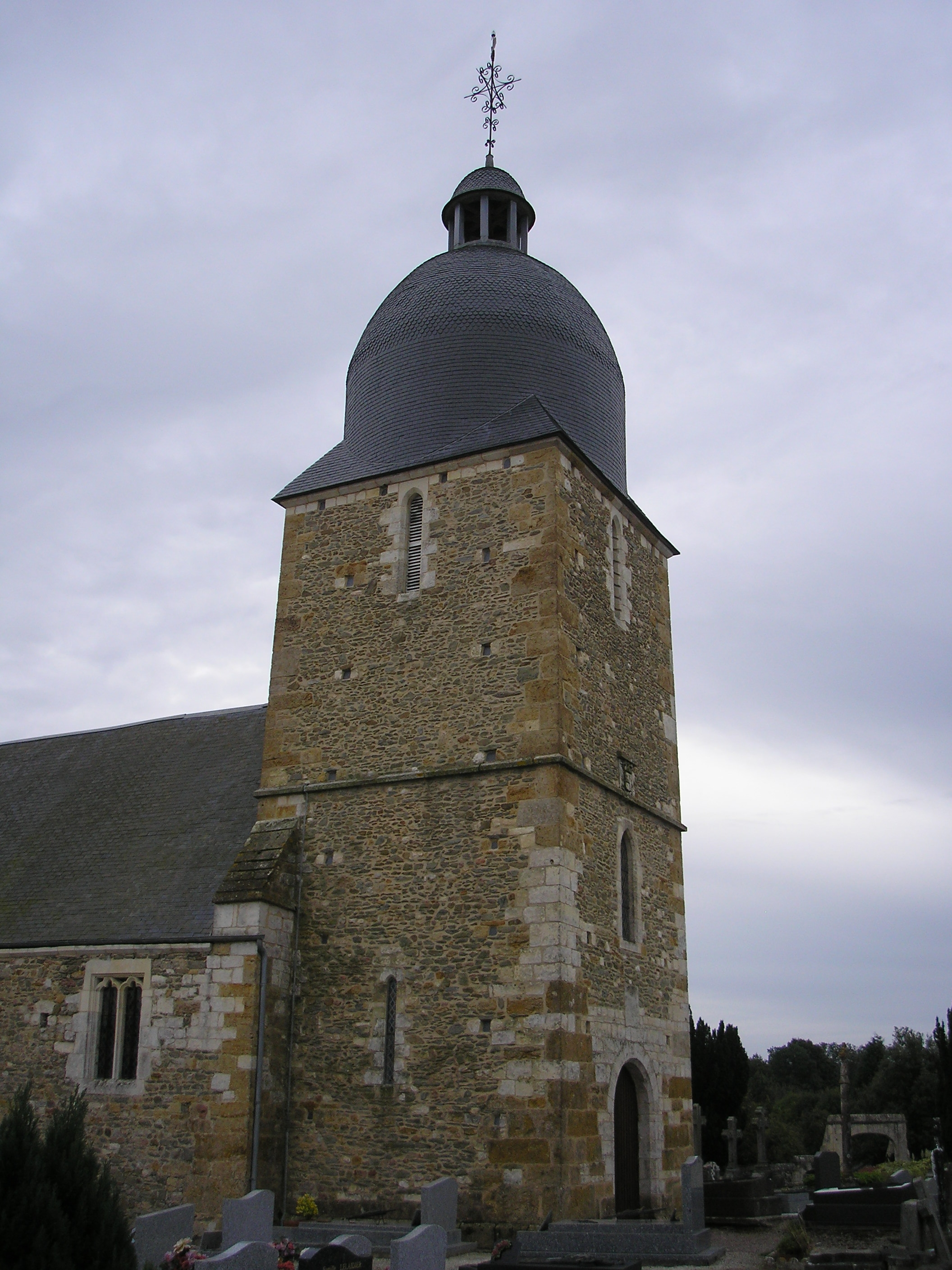
- The church in Donnay
- Location of Donnay
- Location within France Location within Normandy
- Coordinates: 48°57′15″N 0°24′57″W
- Country: France
- Region: Normandy
- Department: Calvados
- Arrondissement: Caen
- Canton: Le Hom
- Intercommunality: Cingal-Suisse Normande

Government
  - Mayor (2020–2026): Théophile Lecerf
- Area^{1}: 11.19 km^{2} (4.32 sq mi)
- Elevation: 250 m (820 ft)
- Highest elevation: 297 m (974 ft)
- Lowest elevation: 110 m (360 ft)
- Population (2023): 330
  - Density: 29/km^{2} (76/sq mi)
- Time zone: UTC+01:00 (CET)
  - Summer (DST): UTC+02:00 (CEST)
- INSEE/Postal code: 14226 /14220
- ^{1} French Land Register data, which excludes lakes, ponds, glaciers > 1 km^{2} (0.386 sq mi or 247 acres) and river estuaries.

Donnay (French pronunciation: [dɔnɛ]) is a commune in the Calvados department and Normandy region of north-western France.

== Geography ==
The commune is part of the area known as Suisse Normande.

=== Villages and hamlets ===
The commune is made up of the following collection of villages and hamlets, Villers and Donnay.

=== Streams ===
The commune has six streams running through its borders, The Trois Monts, The Bactot, The Grand Etang, La Vallee des Vaux, The Pont de Combray and La Vieille Maison.

== Population ==
Historical population
Year	Pop.	±% p.a.
1968	200	—
1975	169	−2.38%
1982	172	+0.25%
1990	177	+0.36%
1999	190	+0.79%
2007	187	−0.20%
2012	222	+3.49%
2017	279	+4.68%
2023	330	+2.84%
Source: INSEE

== See also ==
- Communes of the Calvados department
