= Communauté de communes Cingal-Suisse Normande =

Federation of municipalities in Lower Normandy, France

Cingal-Suisse Normande
- Communauté de communes
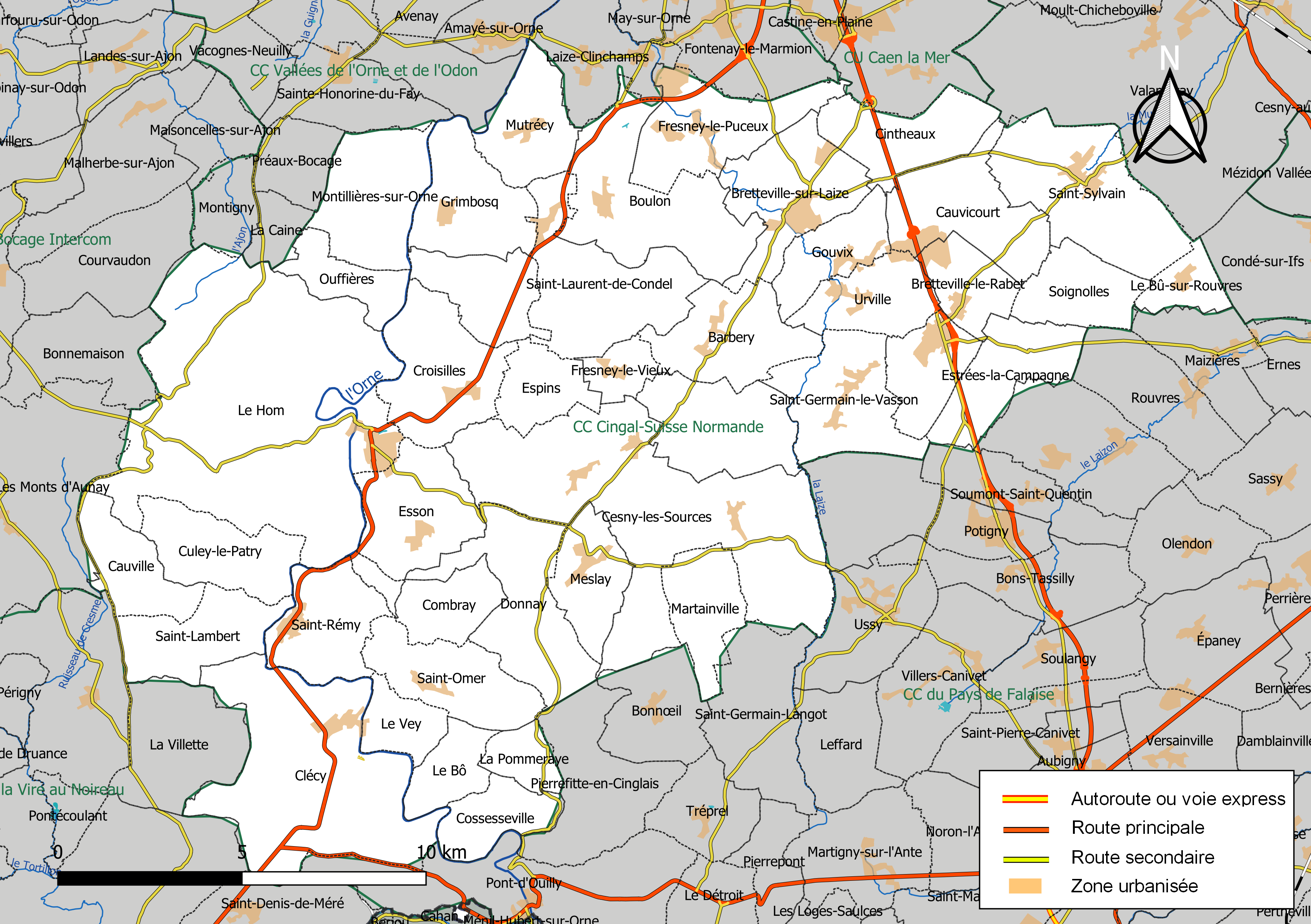
- Map of the commune
- Country: France
- Region: Normandy
- Department: Calvados
- No. of communes: {{{nbcomm}}}
- Established: January 2017

Government
  - President: Jacky Lehugeur
- Area: 373.9 km^{2} (144.4 sq mi)
- Population (2019): 24,516
  - Density: 65.57/km^{2} (169.8/sq mi)
- Website: www.suisse-normande.com

The Communauté de communes Cingal-Suisse Normande is a federation of municipalities (communauté de communes) in the Calvados département and in the Normandy région of France. Its seat is Thury-Harcourt-le-Hom. Its area is 373.9 km^{2}, and its population in 2019 was 24,516. It covers some of the Communes that make up the area known as Suisse Normande.

== History ==
The Communauté de communes Cingal-Suisse Normande was formed on the 1st January 2017, when the communauté de communes du Cingal merged with the communauté de communes de la Suisse normande.

== Composition ==
The communauté de communes consists of the following 41 communes:

1. Barbery
2. Le Bô
3. Boulon
4. Bretteville-le-Rabet
5. Bretteville-sur-Laize
6. Le Bû-sur-Rouvres
7. Cauvicourt
8. Cauville
9. Cesny-les-Sources
10. Cintheaux
11. Clécy
12. Combray
13. Cossesseville
14. Croisilles
15. Culey-le-Patry
16. Donnay
17. Espins
18. Esson
19. Estrées-la-Campagne
20. Fresney-le-Puceux
21. Fresney-le-Vieux
22. Grainville-Langannerie
23. Gouvix
24. Grimbosq
25. Martainville
26. Meslay
27. Montillières-sur-Orne
28. Moulines
29. Les Moutiers-en-Cinglais
30. Mutrécy
31. Ouffières
32. La Pommeraye
33. Saint-Germain-le-Vasson
34. Saint-Lambert
35. Saint-Laurent-de-Condel
36. Saint-Omer
37. Saint-Rémy
38. Soignolles
39. Thury-Harcourt-le-Hom
40. Urville
41. Le Vey
