= Combray =

- Commune
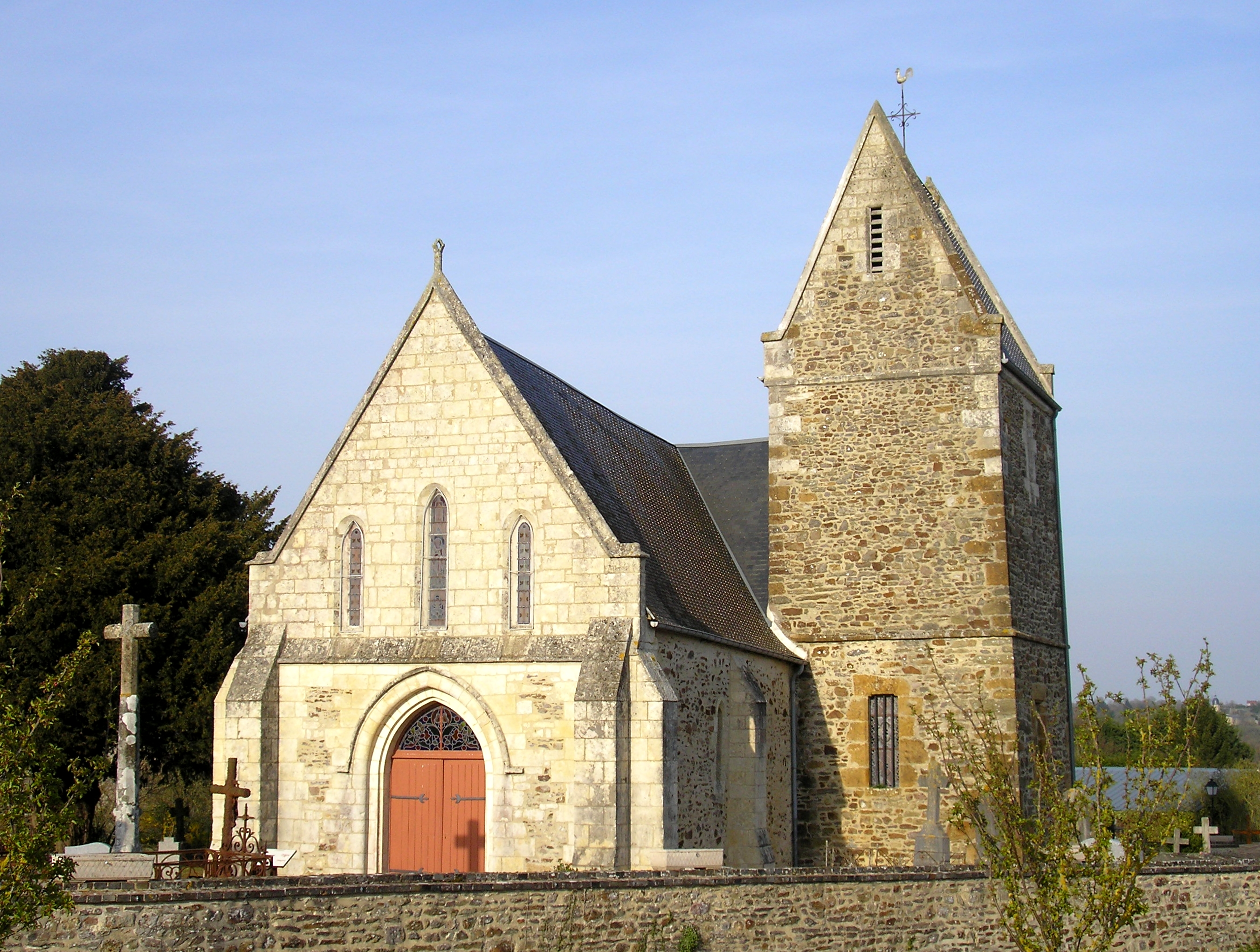
- The church in Combray
- Location of Combray
- Location within France Location within Normandy
- Coordinates: 48°57′00″N 0°26′17″W
- Country: France
- Region: Normandy
- Department: Calvados
- Arrondissement: Caen
- Canton: Le Hom
- Intercommunality: Cingal-Suisse Normande

Government
  - Mayor (2020–2026): Roger Havas
- Area^{1}: 4.51 km^{2} (1.74 sq mi)
- Elevation: 187 m (614 ft)
- Highest elevation: 230 m (750 ft)
- Lowest elevation: 88 m (289 ft)
- Population (2023): 153
  - Density: 33.9/km^{2} (87.9/sq mi)
- Time zone: UTC+01:00 (CET)
  - Summer (DST): UTC+02:00 (CEST)
- INSEE/Postal code: 14171 /14220
- ^{1} French Land Register data, which excludes lakes, ponds, glaciers > 1 km^{2} (0.386 sq mi or 247 acres) and river estuaries.

Combray (French pronunciation: [kɔ̃bʁɛ]) is a commune in the Calvados department in Normandy in north-western France. The commune is part of the area known as Suisse Normande.

Combray is also an imagined village in Marcel Proust's À la recherche du temps perdu (In Search of Lost Time), a book which was strongly inspired by the village of his childhood, Illiers, which has now been renamed Illiers-Combray in his honor. Combray is the title of the first part of the first volume of À la recherche du temps perdu, titled Du côté de chez Swann (Swann's Way).

There is a medieval motte-and-bailey castle.

== Geography ==
The commune is part of the area known as Suisse Normande.

The commune is made up of the following collection of villages and hamlets, Les Gosselins, Les Soyers, Le Hamel, Le Bas de la Courrière and Combray.

The commune has 2 watercourses running through it The Pont de Combray stream and La Vallee des Vaux stream.

== Population ==
Historical population
Year	Pop.	±% p.a.
1968	123	—
1975	95	−3.62%
1982	100	+0.74%
1990	98	−0.25%
1999	130	+3.19%
2007	124	−0.59%
2012	143	+2.89%
2017	148	+0.69%
2023	153	+0.56%
Source: INSEE
