= Cossesseville =

- Commune
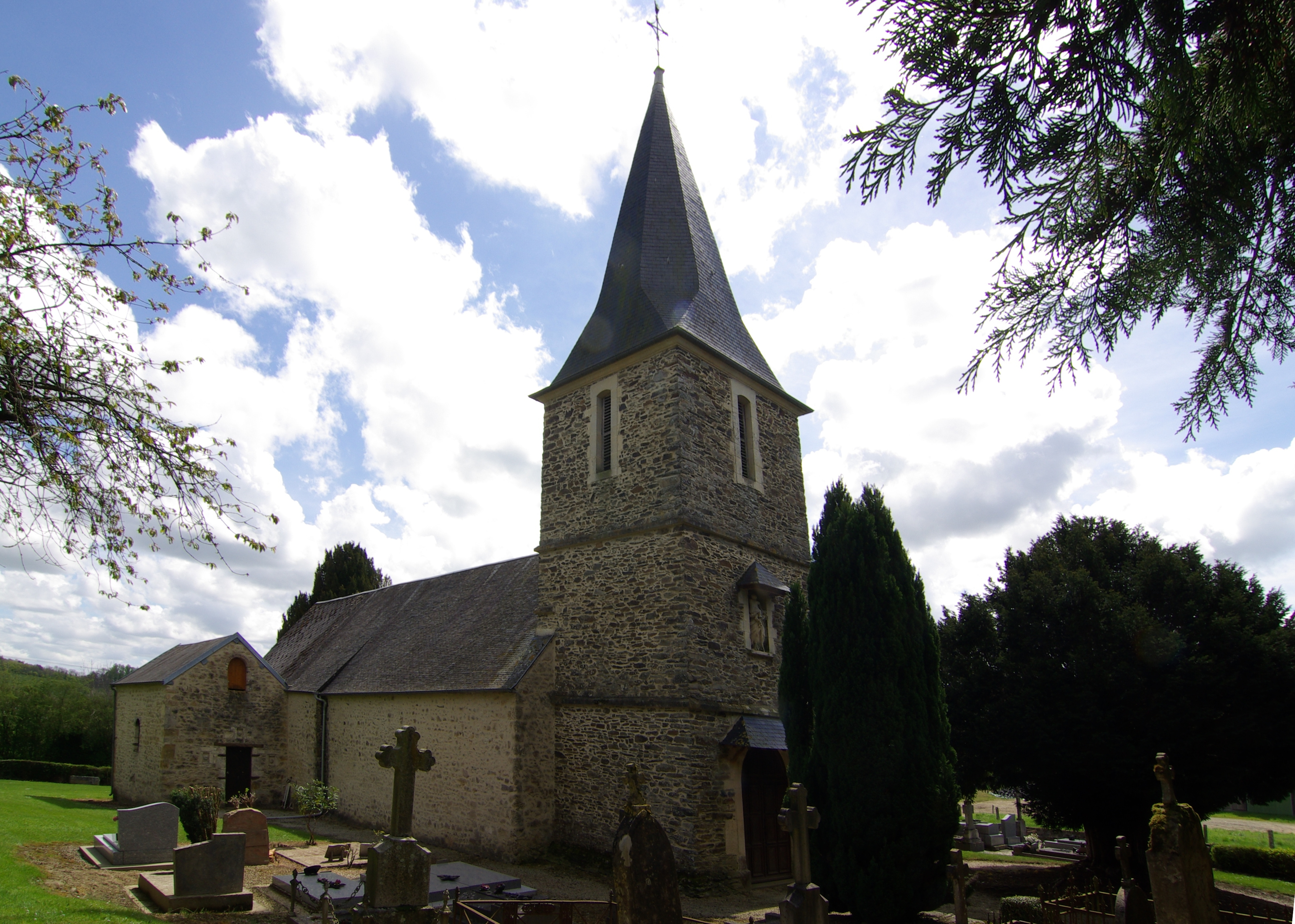
- The church in Cossesseville
- Location of Cossesseville
- Location within France Location within Normandy
- Coordinates: 48°53′47″N 0°25′06″W
- Country: France
- Region: Normandy
- Department: Calvados
- Arrondissement: Caen
- Canton: Le Hom
- Intercommunality: Cingal-Suisse Normande

Government
  - Mayor (2020–2026): Laurence Serrurier
- Area^{1}: 4.74 km^{2} (1.83 sq mi)
- Elevation: 150 m (490 ft)
- Highest elevation: 201 m (659 ft)
- Lowest elevation: 38 m (125 ft)
- Population (2023): 103
  - Density: 21.7/km^{2} (56.3/sq mi)
- Time zone: UTC+01:00 (CET)
  - Summer (DST): UTC+02:00 (CEST)
- INSEE/Postal code: 14183 /14690
- ^{1} French Land Register data, which excludes lakes, ponds, glaciers > 1 km^{2} (0.386 sq mi or 247 acres) and river estuaries.

Cossesseville (French pronunciation: [kɔsɛsvil]) is a commune in the Calvados department in the Normandy region in northwestern France.

== Geography ==
The commune is part of the area known as Suisse Normande.

The commune is made up of the following collection of villages and hamlets, La Sauvagère, Le Jardin, Le Fouc, Le Bout Dessous and Cossesseville.

The Commune with another 20 communes shares part of a 2,115 hectare, Natura 2000 conservation area, called the Vallée de l'Orne et ses affluents.

The river Orne plus two streams Orival and Val la Here are the three watercourses that flow through the commune.

== Population ==
Historical population
Year	Pop.	±% p.a.
1968	125	—
1975	99	−3.28%
1982	83	−2.49%
1990	90	+1.02%
1999	88	−0.25%
2007	108	+2.59%
2012	101	−1.33%
2017	95	−1.22%
2023	103	+1.36%
Source: INSEE

== See also ==
- Communes of the Calvados department
