= Estrées-la-Campagne =

- Commune
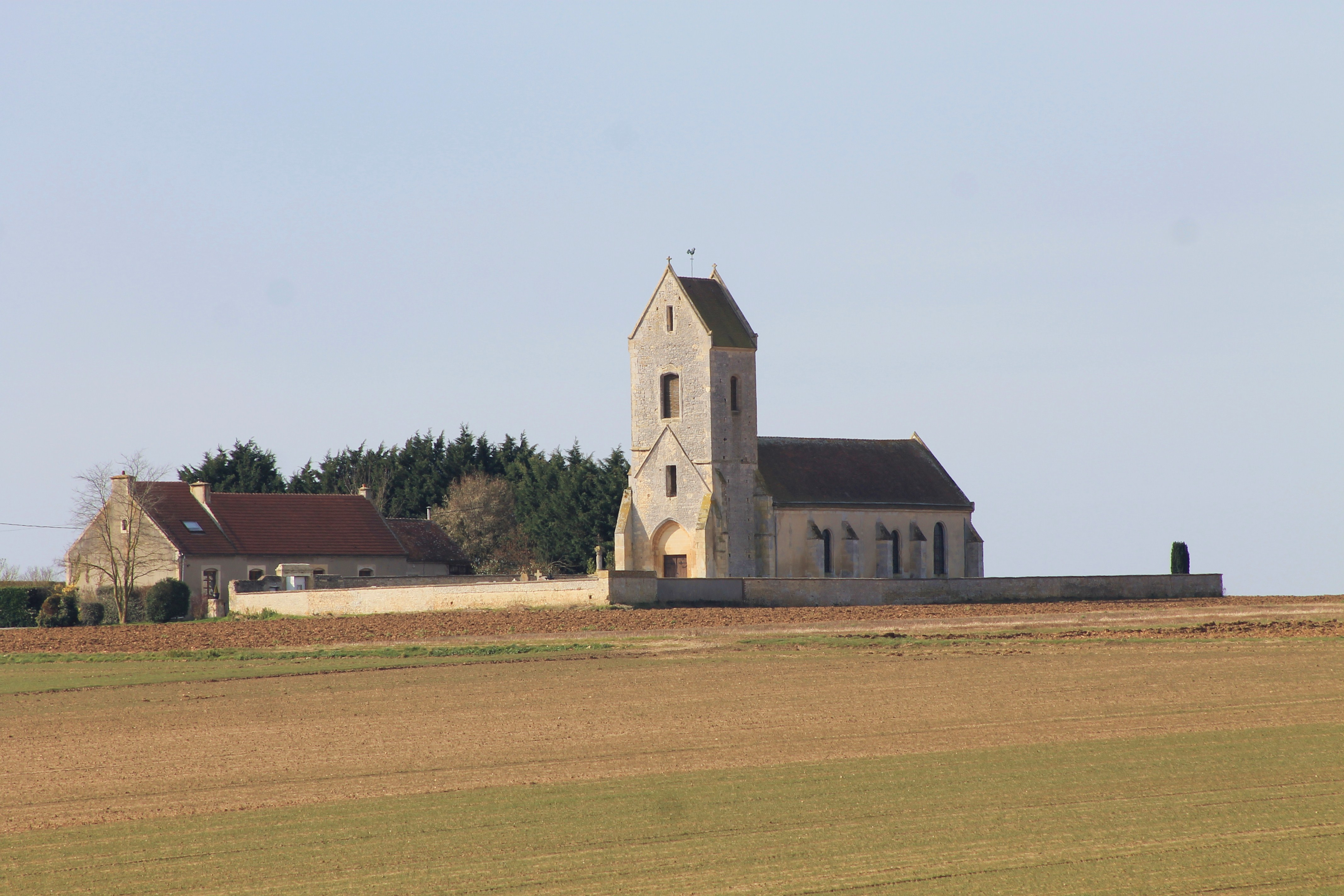
- The church in Estrées-la-Campagne
- Location of Estrées-la-Campagne
- Location within France Location within Normandy
- Coordinates: 49°00′52″N 0°13′59″W
- Country: France
- Region: Normandy
- Department: Calvados
- Arrondissement: Caen
- Canton: Le Hom
- Intercommunality: Cingal-Suisse Normande

Government
  - Mayor (2020–2026): Alain Leprince
- Area^{1}: 7.45 km^{2} (2.88 sq mi)
- Elevation: 100 m (330 ft)
- Highest elevation: 179 m (587 ft)
- Lowest elevation: 82 m (269 ft)
- Population (2023): 245
  - Density: 32.9/km^{2} (85.2/sq mi)
- Time zone: UTC+01:00 (CET)
  - Summer (DST): UTC+02:00 (CEST)
- INSEE/Postal code: 14252 /14190
- ^{1} French Land Register data, which excludes lakes, ponds, glaciers > 1 km^{2} (0.386 sq mi or 247 acres) and river estuaries.

Estrées-la-Campagne (French pronunciation: [ɛtʁe la kɑ̃paɲ]) is a commune in the Calvados department in the Normandy region in northwestern France.

It is one of many villages in the north of France bearing the name Estrées. The etymology of the name is from strata (cognate of English "street"), the word for the stone-layered Roman roads in the area (some of which turned into modern highways). Hence Estreti, village on the road which developed into Estrées.

== Geography ==
The commune is made up of the following collection of villages and hamlets, La Croix, Quesnay and Estrées-la-Campagne.

== Population ==
Historical population
Year	Pop.	±% p.a.
1968	170	—
1975	172	+0.17%
1982	168	−0.34%
1990	158	−0.76%
1999	176	+1.21%
2007	205	+1.92%
2012	236	+2.86%
2017	248	+1.00%
2023	245	−0.20%
Source: INSEE

== Points of Interest ==
- Eglise Notre-Dame du Quesnay - is a church built in the thirteenth century which was listed as a Monument historique in 1964.

== See also ==
- Communes of the Calvados department
