= Mutrécy =

- Commune
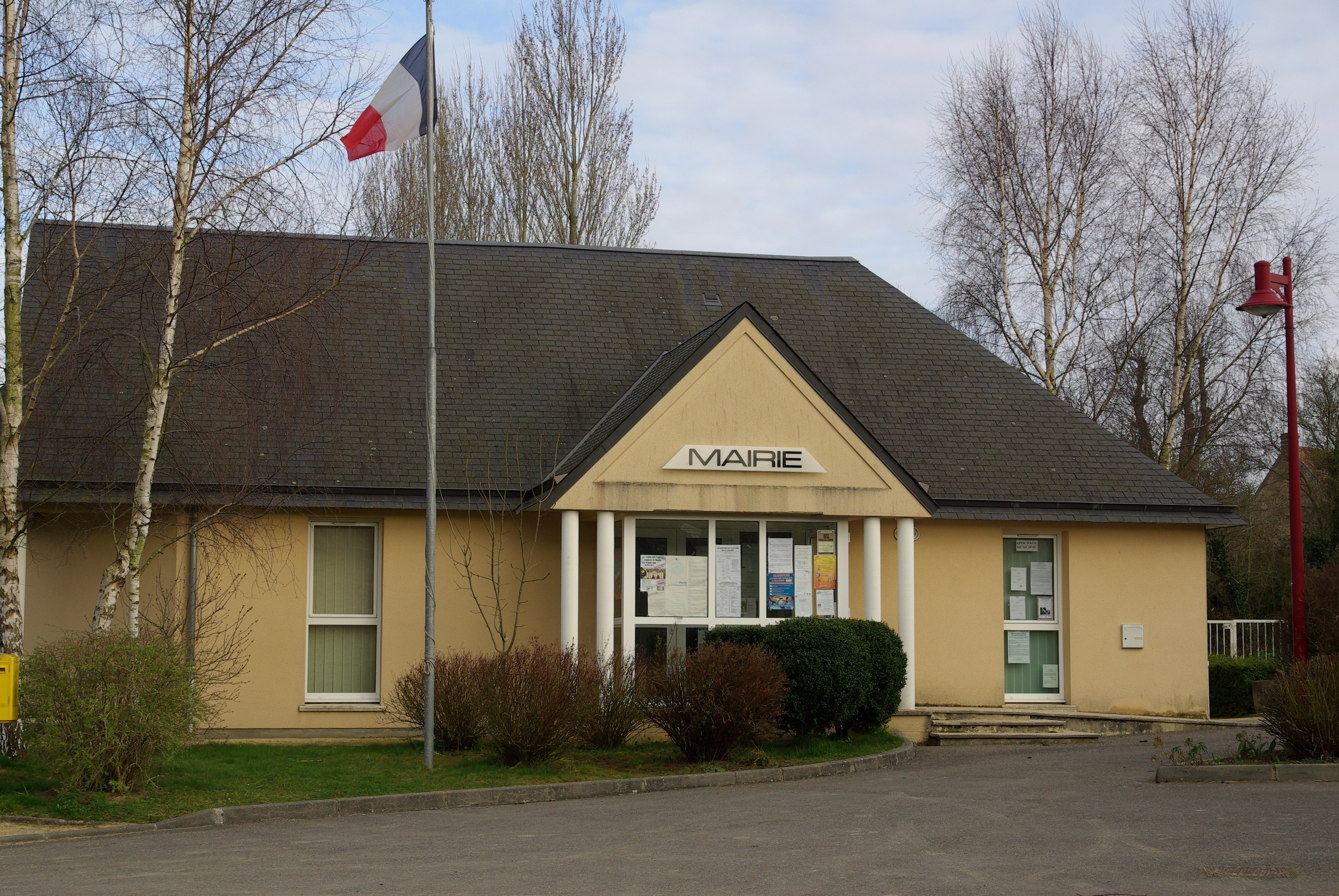
- Town hall
- Location of Mutrécy
- Location within France Location within Normandy
- Coordinates: 49°03′51″N 0°25′15″W
- Country: France
- Region: Normandy
- Department: Calvados
- Arrondissement: Caen
- Canton: Le Hom
- Intercommunality: Cingal-Suisse Normande

Government
  - Mayor (2020–2026): Gérard Valentin
- Area^{1}: 6.71 km^{2} (2.59 sq mi)
- Elevation: 85 m (279 ft)
- Highest elevation: 104 m (341 ft)
- Lowest elevation: 7 m (23 ft)
- Population (2023): 593
  - Density: 88.4/km^{2} (229/sq mi)
- Time zone: UTC+01:00 (CET)
  - Summer (DST): UTC+02:00 (CEST)
- INSEE/Postal code: 14461 /14220
- ^{1} French Land Register data, which excludes lakes, ponds, glaciers > 1 km^{2} (0.386 sq mi or 247 acres) and river estuaries.

Mutrécy (French pronunciation: [mytʁesi]) is a commune in the Calvados department in the Normandy region in northwestern France.

== Geography ==
The commune is part of the area known as Suisse Normande.

The commune is made up of the following collection of villages and hamlets, La Butte, Le Drollet and Mutrécy.

The river Orne plus three streams The Coupe-Gorge, la Petite Vallee and La Grande Vallee are the four watercourses running through the commune.

== Population ==
Historical population
| Year | Pop. | ±% p.a. |
|---|---|---|
| 1968 | 189 | — |
| 1975 | 207 | +1.31% |
| 1982 | 216 | +0.61% |
| 1990 | 219 | +0.17% |
| 1999 | 266 | +2.18% |
| 2007 | 323 | +2.46% |
| 2012 | 366 | +2.53% |
| 2017 | 359 | −0.39% |
| 2023 | 593 | +8.72% |
Source: INSEE

== Points of interest ==
=== National heritage sites ===
- Saint-Clair Church is an eleventh century church which was listed as a monument in 1913.

== See also ==
- Communes of the Calvados department

== Gallery ==
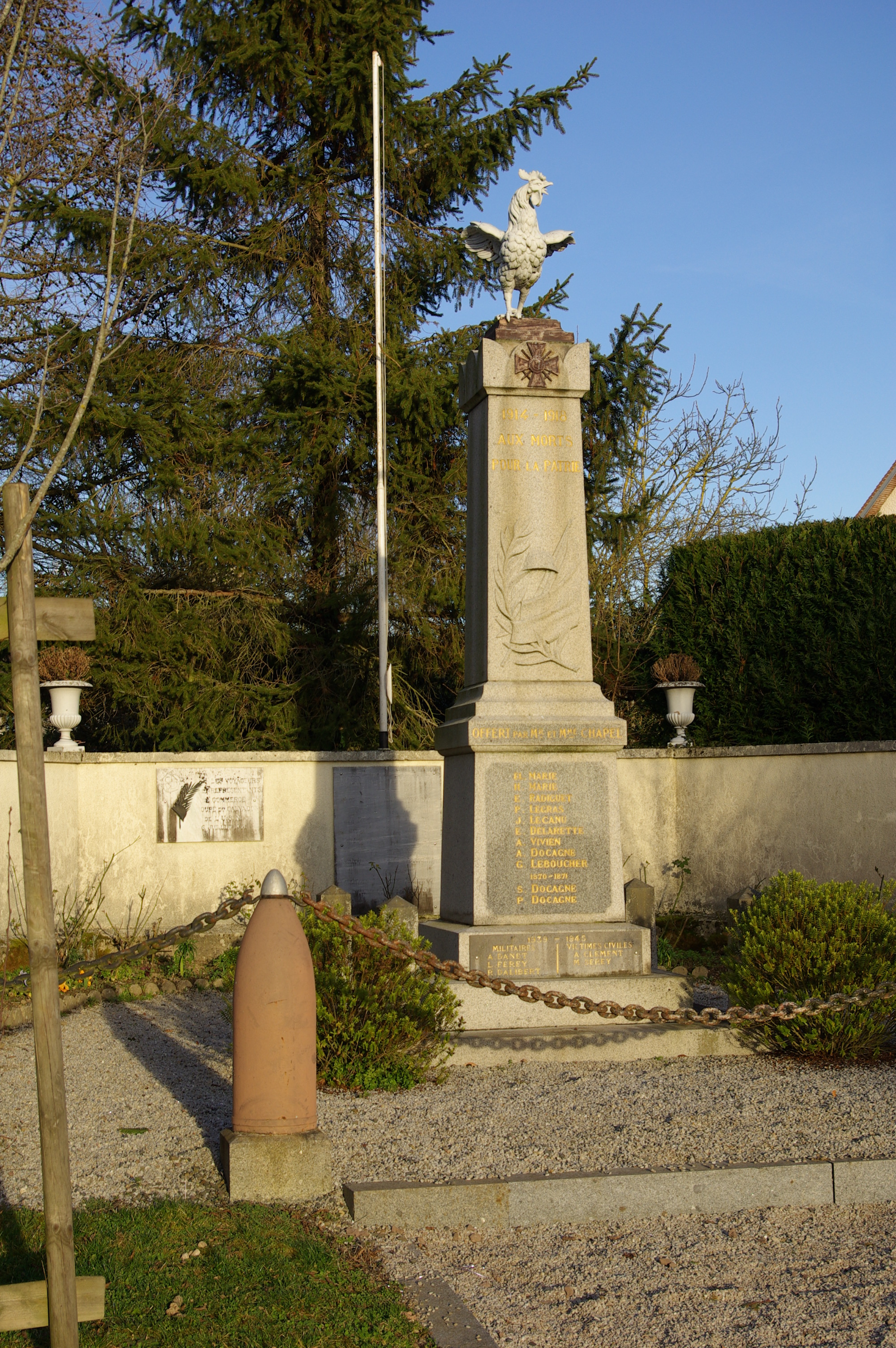
War memorial

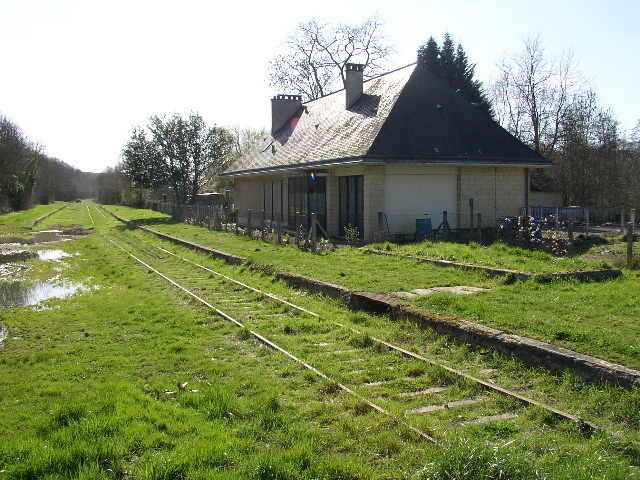
Station platforms

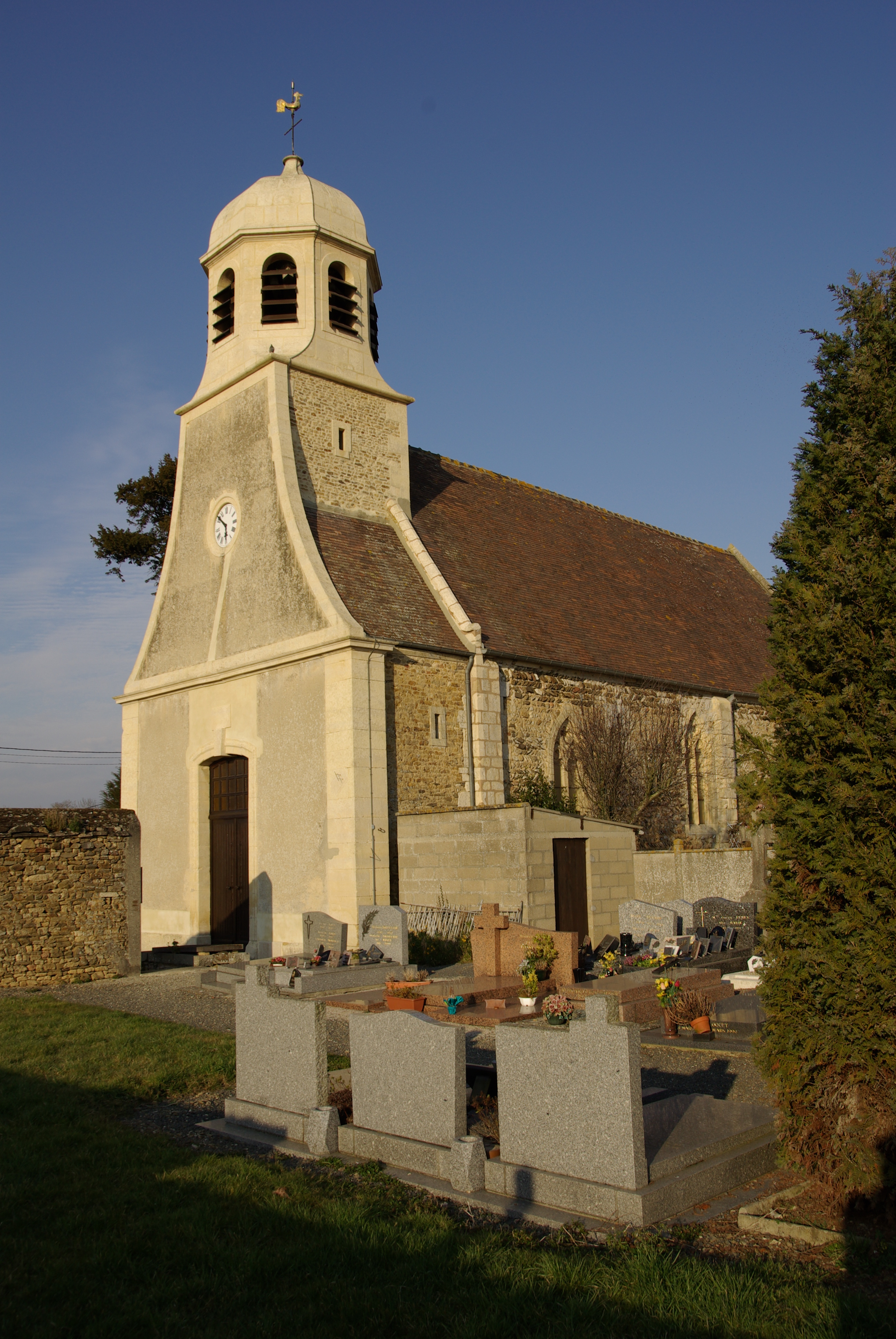
11th century church of Saint-Clair

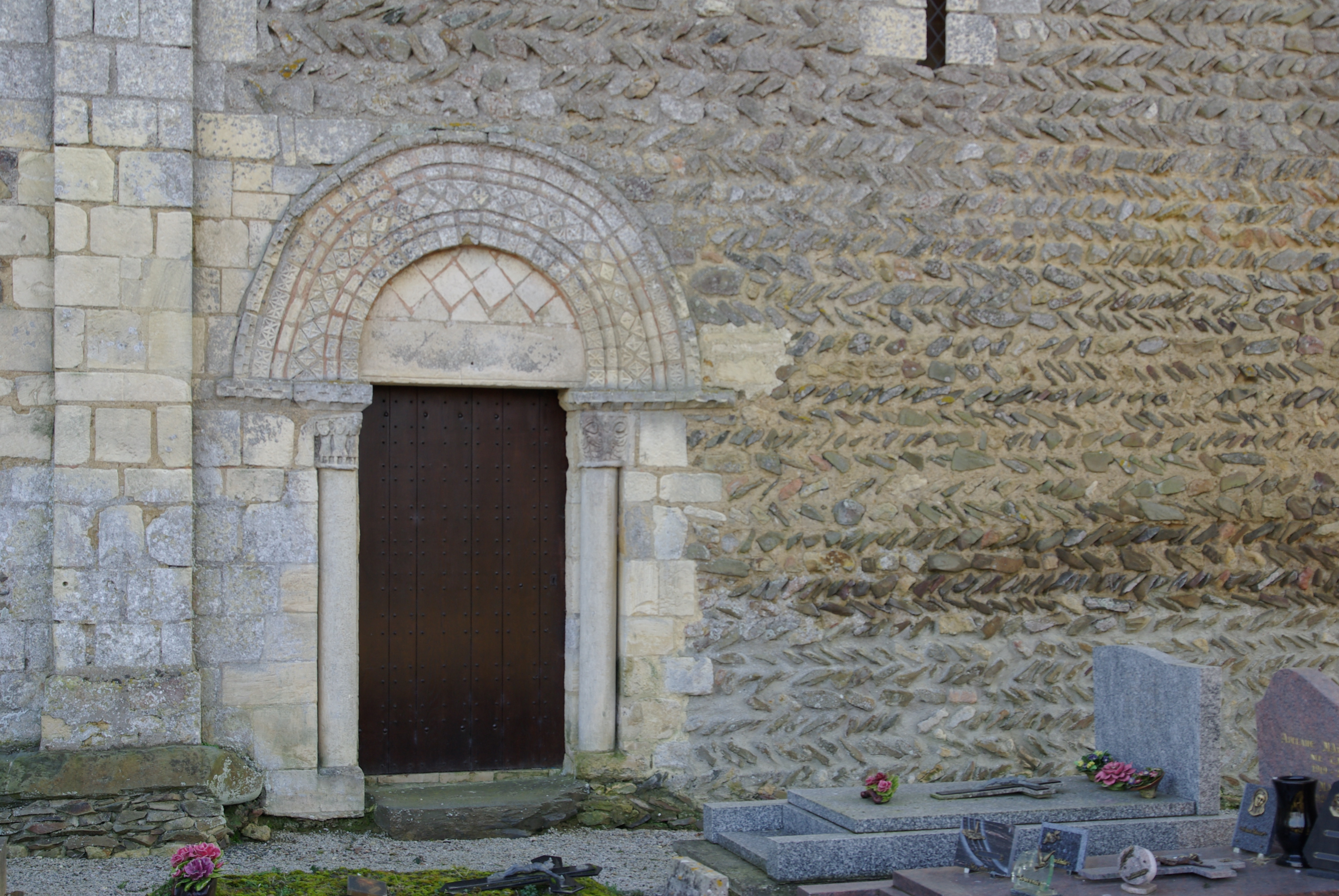
Side door of church
