= Esson, Calvados =

Esson
- Commune
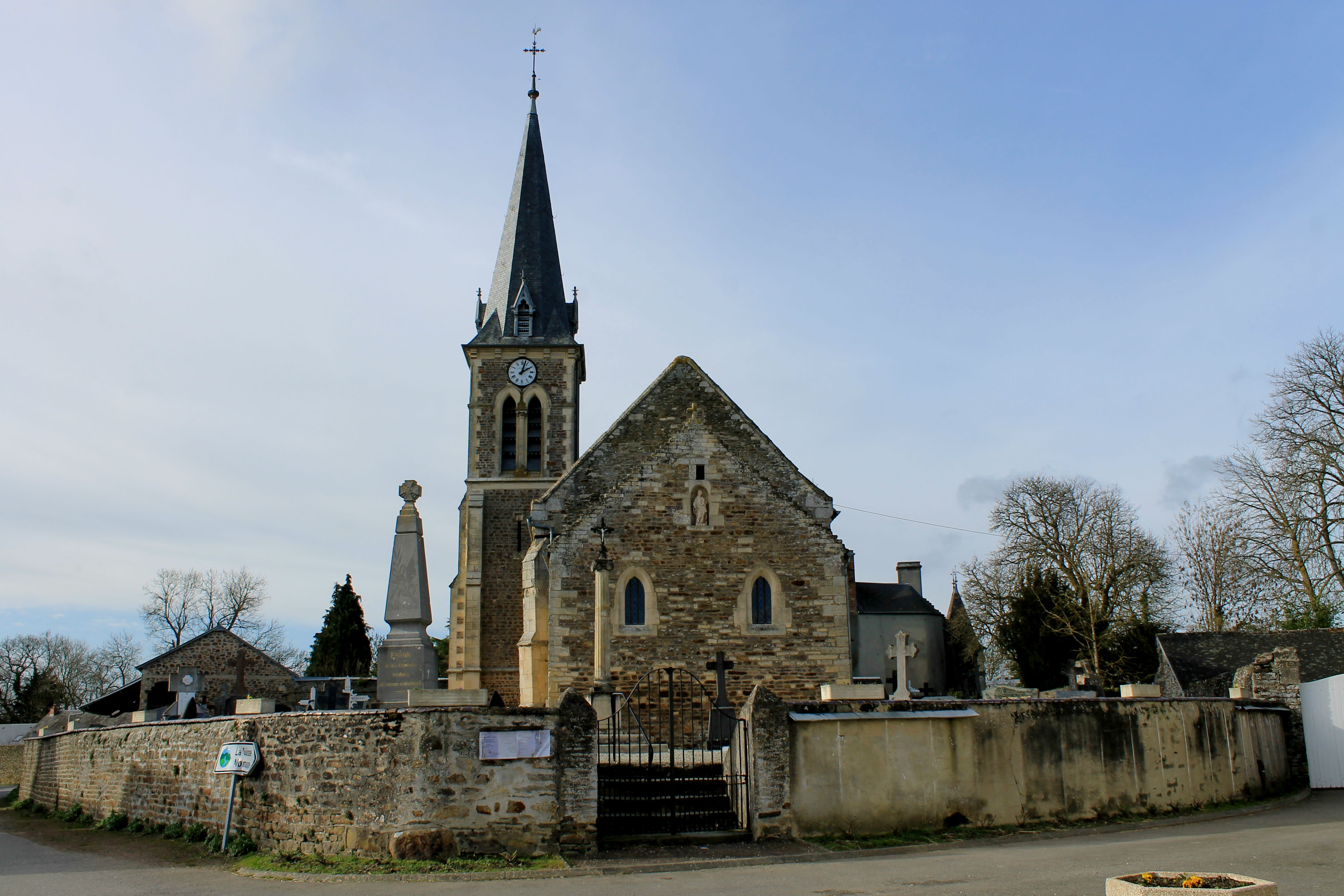
- The church in Esson
- Location of Esson
- Location within France Location within Normandy
- Coordinates: 48°57′54″N 0°27′13″W
- Country: France
- Region: Normandy
- Department: Calvados
- Arrondissement: Caen
- Canton: Le Hom
- Intercommunality: Cingal-Suisse Normande

Government
  - Mayor (2020–2026): Gilles Pitel
- Area^{1}: 8.86 km^{2} (3.42 sq mi)
- Elevation: 168 m (551 ft)
- Highest elevation: 187 m (614 ft)
- Lowest elevation: 24 m (79 ft)
- Population (2023): 576
  - Density: 65.0/km^{2} (168/sq mi)
- Time zone: UTC+01:00 (CET)
  - Summer (DST): UTC+02:00 (CEST)
- INSEE/Postal code: 14251 /14220
- ^{1} French Land Register data, which excludes lakes, ponds, glaciers > 1 km^{2} (0.386 sq mi or 247 acres) and river estuaries.

Esson (French pronunciation: [ɛsɔ̃]) is a commune in the Calvados department in the Normandy region in northwestern France.

== Geography ==
The commune is part of the area known as Suisse Normande.

The commune is made up of the following collection of villages and hamlets, Le Haut Breuil and Esson.

The river Orne plus three streams, La Vallee des Vaux, The Pont de Combray and The Traspy, flow through the commune.

== Population ==
Historical population
Year	Pop.	±% p.a.
1968	304	—
1975	275	−1.42%
1982	263	−0.64%
1990	297	+1.53%
1999	335	+1.35%
2007	381	+1.62%
2012	497	+5.46%
2017	516	+0.75%
2023	576	+1.85%
Source: INSEE

== See also ==
- Communes of the Calvados department
