= Canton of Le Hom =

Coordinates: 48.99°N 0.48°W

Le Hom
- Canton
- Interactive map of Le Hom
- Country: France
- Region: Normandy
- Department: Calvados
- No. of communes: {{{nbcomm}}}

Government
  - Representatives (2021–2028): Bruno François; Sylvie Jacq
- Area: 387.79 km^{2} (149.73 sq mi)
- Population (2023): 25,094
  - Density: 64.710/km^{2} (167.60/sq mi)
- INSEE code: 14 22

The canton of Le Hom (before 2021: Thury-Harcourt) is an administrative division of the Calvados department, northwestern France. Its borders were modified at the French canton reorganisation which came into effect in March 2015. Its seat is in Thury-Harcourt-le-Hom.

== Composition ==
It consists of the following communes:

1. Barbery
2. Le Bô
3. Boulon
4. Bretteville-le-Rabet
5. Bretteville-sur-Laize
6. Le Bû-sur-Rouvres
7. Cauvicourt
8. Cauville
9. Cesny-les-Sources
10. Cintheaux
11. Clécy
12. Combray
13. Cossesseville
14. Croisilles
15. Culey-le-Patry
16. Donnay
17. Espins
18. Esson
19. Estrées-la-Campagne
20. Fresney-le-Puceux
21. Fresney-le-Vieux
22. Gouvix
23. Grainville-Langannerie
24. Grimbosq
25. Martainville
26. Meslay
27. Montillières-sur-Orne
28. Moulines
29. Les Moutiers-en-Cinglais
30. Mutrécy
31. Ouffières
32. La Pommeraye
33. Saint-Germain-le-Vasson
34. Saint-Lambert
35. Saint-Laurent-de-Condel
36. Saint-Omer
37. Saint-Rémy
38. Saint-Sylvain
39. Soignolles
40. Thury-Harcourt-le-Hom
41. Urville
42. Le Vey

== Councillors ==
Election	Councillors	Party	Occupation
2015	Paul Chandelier	DVD	Delegate mayor of Thury-Harcourt
2015	Sylvie Jacq	DVD	Former councillor of Trois-Monts

== Pictures of the canton ==
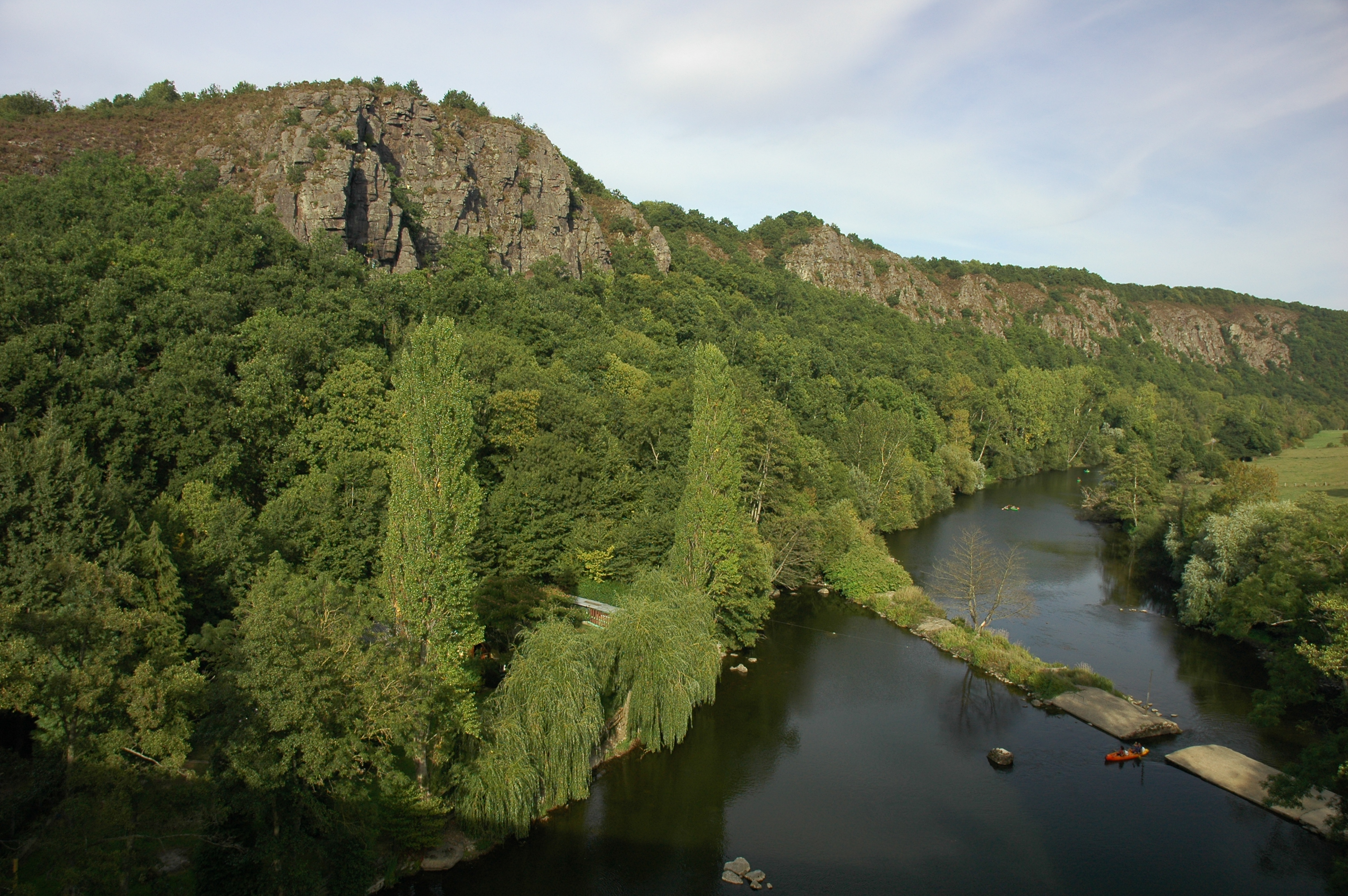
Landscape in Clécy

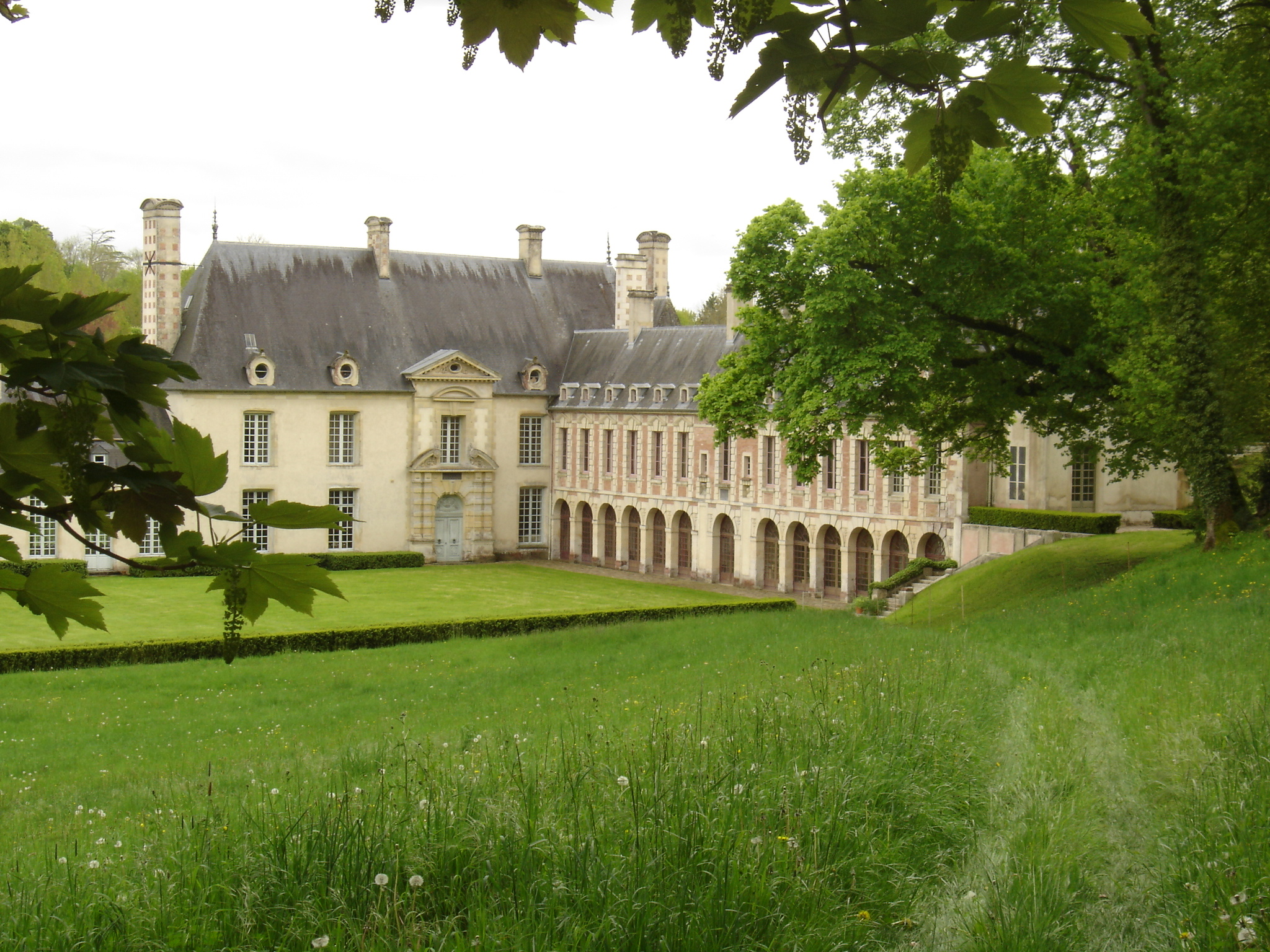
Castle of Gouvix

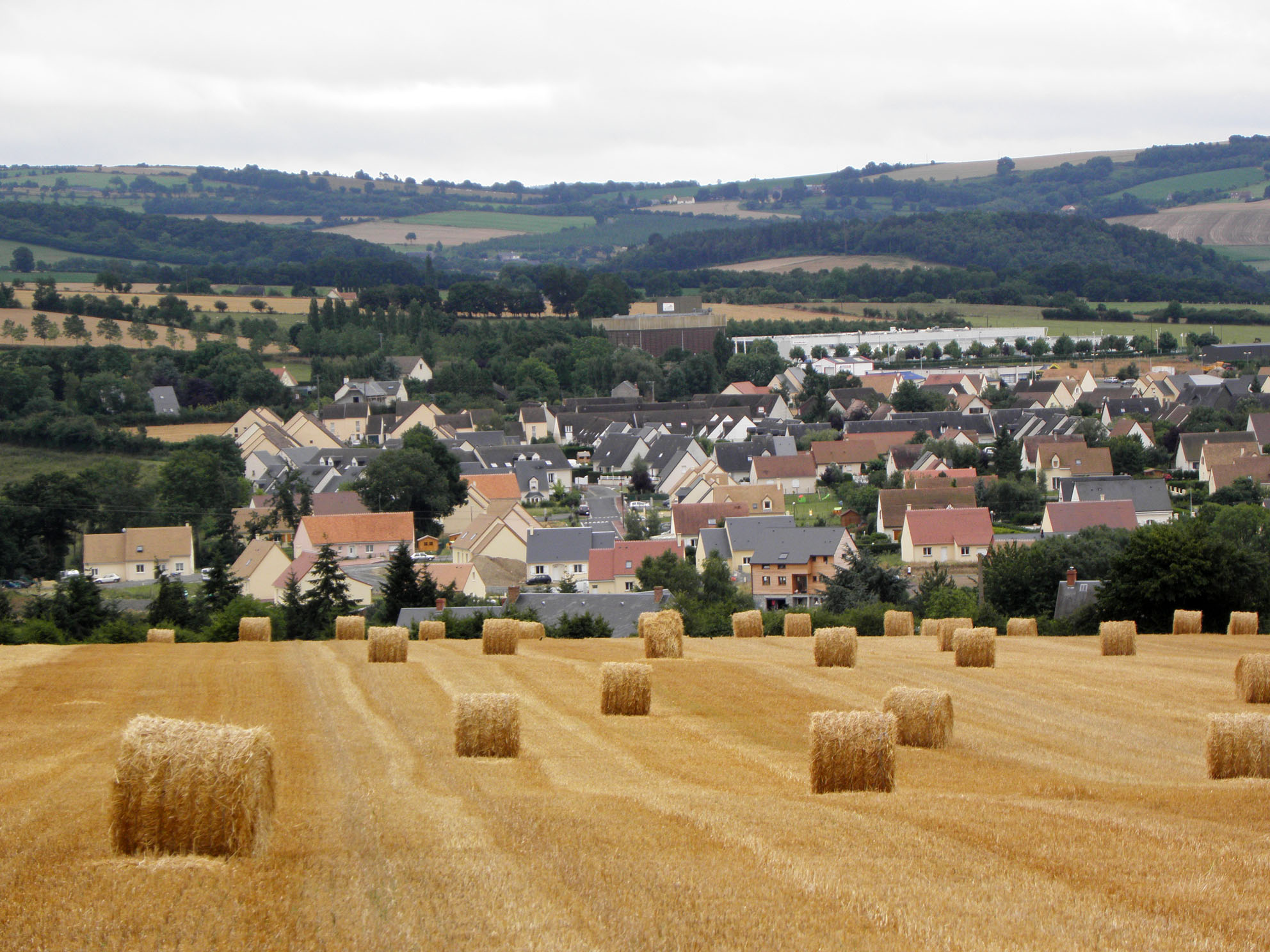
View of Thury-Harcourt
