= Barou-en-Auge =

- Commune
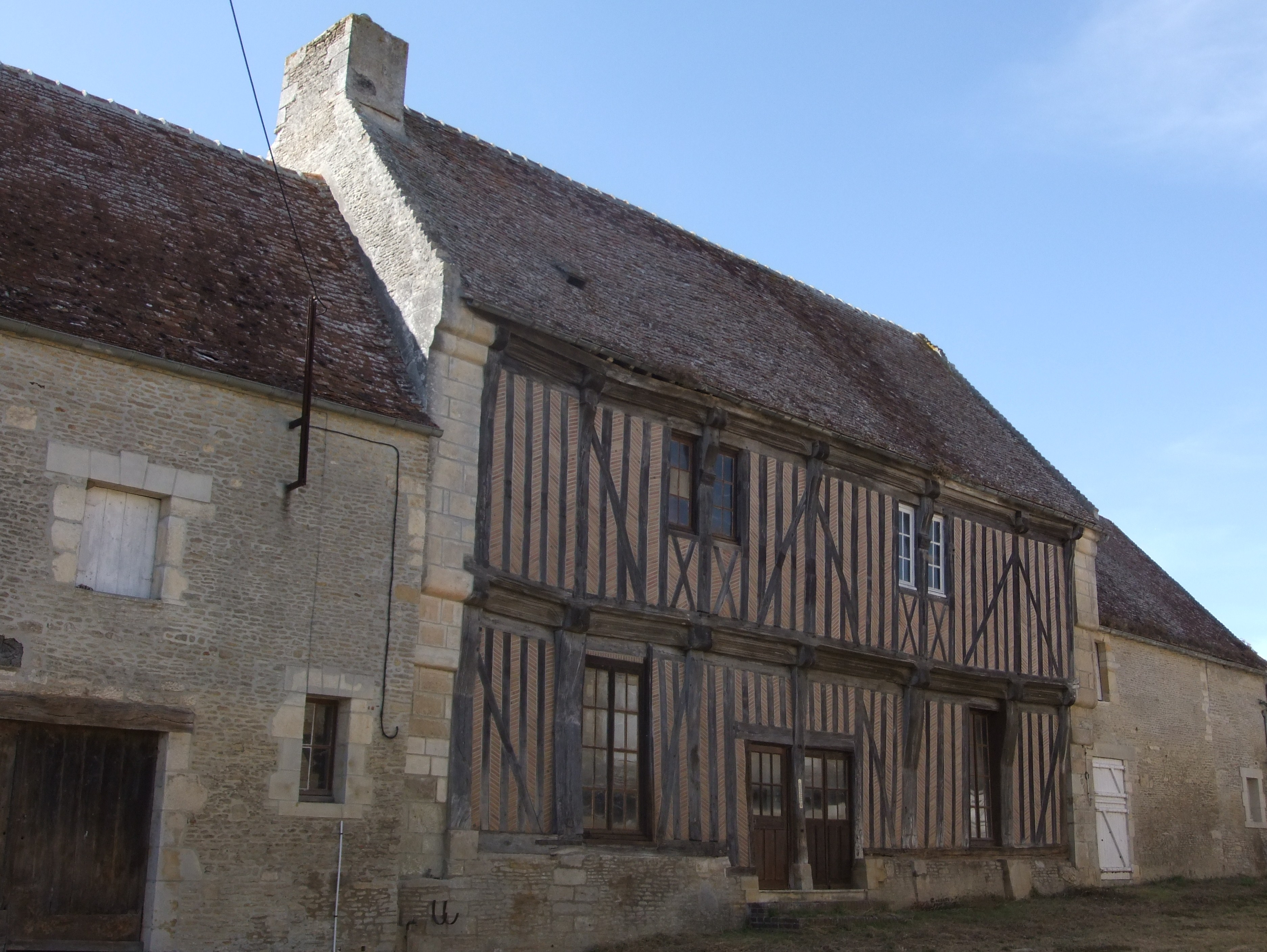
- Half-timbered house
- Location of Barou-en-Auge
- Location within France Location within Normandy
- Coordinates: 48°55′59″N 0°02′35″W
- Country: France
- Region: Normandy
- Department: Calvados
- Arrondissement: Caen
- Canton: Falaise
- Intercommunality: Pays de Falaise

Government
  - Mayor (2020–2026): Jean-Louis Gallet
- Area^{1}: 8.35 km^{2} (3.22 sq mi)
- Elevation: 66 m (217 ft)
- Highest elevation: 116 m (381 ft)
- Lowest elevation: 49 m (161 ft)
- Population (2023): 67
  - Density: 8.0/km^{2} (21/sq mi)
- Time zone: UTC+01:00 (CET)
  - Summer (DST): UTC+02:00 (CEST)
- INSEE/Postal code: 14043 /14620
- ^{1} French Land Register data, which excludes lakes, ponds, glaciers > 1 km^{2} (0.386 sq mi or 247 acres) and river estuaries.

Barou-en-Auge (French pronunciation: [baʁu ɑ̃.n‿oʒ], literally Barou in Auge) is a commune in the Calvados department in the Normandy region of north-western France.

The inhabitants of the commune are known as Conias.

== Geography ==
Barou-en-Auge is located some 10 km north-east of Falaise and 8 km south of Saint-Pierre-sur-Dives. Access to the commune is by the D90 road from Louvagny in the north which passes through the centre of the commune and the village before continuing south to Le Marais-la-Chapelle. The D39 from Damblainville to Heurtevent forms the northern border of the commune. The D39B goes west from the village to Morteaux-Coulibœuf.

Le Beudron stream rises near the village and flows west to join the Dives west of the commune. The Ruisseau des Ruaux flows west through the south of the commune and also joins the Dives.

== Toponymy ==
The spelling Barou was attested in 1417. René Lepelley suggested a possible attribution of its origin to the Gallic barro (barre in Old French) meaning "fence" joined to the Gallic suffix of presence -avo meaning "enclosure". Albert Dauzat proposes the Latin anthroponym Barus.

The commune of Barou was renamed Barou-en-Auge in 1936.

== History ==
Barou-en-Auge appears as Barou on the 1750 Cassini Map and the same on the 1790 version.

On 10 November 1855 at around 10:00 am a wolf was seen in Barou commune. Upon a declaration by the mayor a hunt was organized. All landowners with a gun had to travel to the edge of the wood where the wolf had entered. After an epic pursuit in the wood the wolf was wounded after several shots. He managed to escape and take refuge in a small wood located in the commune of Norrey. At eight in the evening the wolf was killed by a day labourer living in Barou. It was a wolf about 3 to 4 years old. A prize of 12 francs was granted.

The Falaise Pocket was the last operation of the Battle of Normandy during the Second World War. It took place from 12 to 21 August 1944 in an area between the four Normandy towns of Trun, Argentan, Vimoutiers and Chambois and ended near Falaise.

== Administration ==
List of Successive Mayors

From	To	Name	Party	Position
1989	2020	Claude Laurent	ind.	Retired
2020	2026	Jean-Louis Gallet		

The Municipal Council is composed of 7 members including the Mayor and 1 deputy.

== Demography ==
Historical population

Year	Pop.	±% p.a.
1793	285	—
1821	245	−0.54%
1846	219	−0.45%
1872	165	−1.08%
1901	141	−0.54%
1926	118	−0.71%
1936	122	+0.33%
1946	126	+0.32%
1962	104	−1.19%

Year	Pop.	±% p.a.
1968	100	−0.65%
1975	87	−1.97%
1982	84	−0.50%
1990	72	−1.91%
1999	69	−0.47%
2007	87	+2.94%
2012	92	+1.12%
2017	78	−3.25%
2023	67	−2.50%

Source: EHESS and INSEE

== Culture and heritage ==
=== Civil heritage ===
- An old Tile Factory. This factory is located on the first clays of the Auge area and close to the woods near Barou which provided fuel. In 1875 it employed four to fifteen workers. The origins of the factory are not known: it is certain that the factory already existed at the beginning of the 19th century when the Tile Factory of Barou was the property of the Jolivet de Colomby family and remains so today. The factory was rented to the Bernuis family. It permanently ceased its activities in 1916 during the First World War with the departure of the men to the front. Production at the factory was seasonal: in spring and summer the clay was mined and tiles were manufactured cooked in ten annual batches. Closed during the winter, the factory reopened after the last frost in April. In summer, especially during the harvest period, the workers went to harvest. Some remains have survived: parts of the oven, the clay insulating cover for baking, a granite millstone for crushing clay, the drying building, and the lodge for the operator who watched the process.
- The Chemin Haussé Roman road passes through the commune coming from Rouvres via Jort and continuing to Exmes.

The commune has a number of buildings and sites that are registered as historical monuments:

- The Grande Ferme Farmhouse (17th century)
- The Taverne Farmhouse (16th century) This farmhouse was once a taverne-inn. The rear façade and the two gables are built in masonry while the main façade is half-timbered with a Corbel arch supported at both corners by the gables. This mixed construction evokes both the Pays d'Auge in the timbering, and the Caen-Falaise plain in the limestone masonry, the village being located on the border of the two regions. The servants' quarters date from the 19th century.
- The Tarenne Farmhouse
- A Chateau(15th century)
- A House(18th century)
- Houses and Farms(16th-19th centuries)

=== Religious heritage ===
The Parish Church of Saint Martin (13th century) is registered as an historical monument. There is a statue in high relief representing the charity of Saint Martin above the portal of the bell tower. This 18th century statue is separated from the rest of the church following the disappearance of a large part of the nave in the late 19th century. It is topped by a weather vane decorated with a tricolor flag instead of the traditional rooster (replaced by the commune). The choir from the 13th century is illuminated by windows with Gothic lancets. The bays of the nave have survived and are closed by a facade decorated with a neo-Gothic portal. To the south, adjoining the choir, the lordly chapel is vaulted with intersecting ribs resting on columns. In the 16th century the lordship of Barou belonged to the Morell family of Aubigny. William, squire of the Queen and Governor of Mortagne au Perche, died in April 1615 as shown on a tombstone and Litre funéraire (a black band around the church to honour the deceased). A funeral decoration is painted in fresco on the wall. The conservation of this type of decoration is rare, the murals were frequently covered according to the tastes of the time.

The Church contains many items that are registered as historical objects:

- A Tombstone of William of Morel (1615)
- A Lectern (19th century)
- A Baptismal Font (16th century)
- A Tabernacle (17th century)
- An Altar and Retable (17th century)
- A Statue: Christ on the Cross (18th century)
- 4 brasses (15th century)
- A Sacristy Chasuble Cabinet (19th century)
- A Litre funéraire (1615)
- 4 Tombstones (19th century)
- A Group Sculpture: Charity of Saint Martin (16th century)

== Festivals ==
- Festival Committee: "Entertainment and leisure Barou-en-Auge" (Albea).

== See also ==
- Communes of the Calvados department
