= Cordey =

- Commune
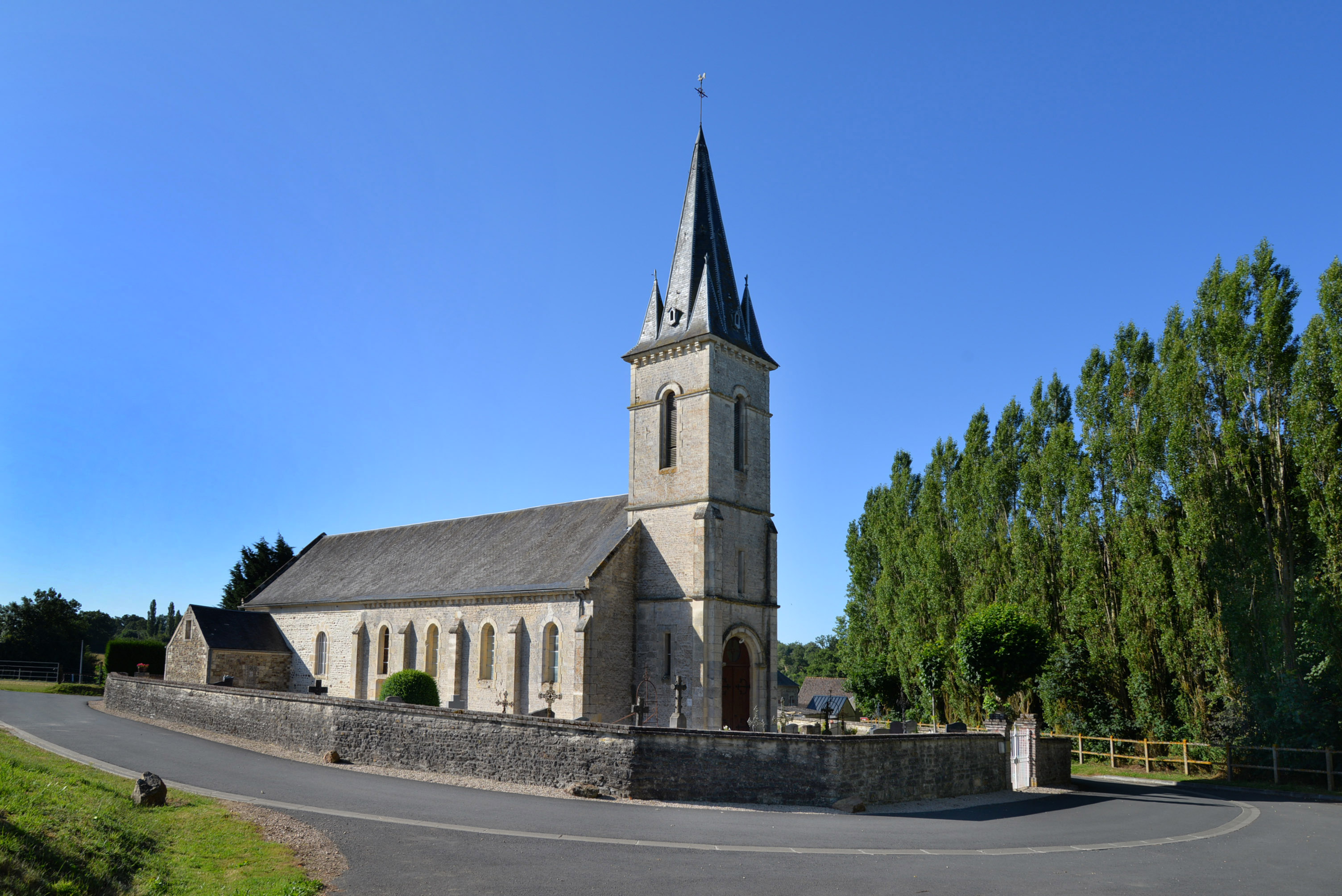
- The church in Cordey
- Location of Cordey
- Location within France Location within Normandy
- Coordinates: 48°51′05″N 0°13′39″W
- Country: France
- Region: Normandy
- Department: Calvados
- Arrondissement: Caen
- Canton: Falaise
- Intercommunality: Pays de Falaise

Government
  - Mayor (2020–2026): Roger Bisson
- Area^{1}: 4.52 km^{2} (1.75 sq mi)
- Elevation: 183 m (600 ft)
- Highest elevation: 229 m (751 ft)
- Lowest elevation: 142 m (466 ft)
- Population (2023): 154
  - Density: 34.1/km^{2} (88.2/sq mi)
- Time zone: UTC+01:00 (CET)
  - Summer (DST): UTC+02:00 (CEST)
- INSEE/Postal code: 14180 /14700
- ^{1} French Land Register data, which excludes lakes, ponds, glaciers > 1 km^{2} (0.386 sq mi or 247 acres) and river estuaries.

Cordey (French pronunciation: [kɔʁdɛ]) is a commune in the Calvados department in the Normandy region in northwestern France.

== Geography ==
The commune of Cordey is part of the area known as Suisse Normande.

The river Baize runs through the commune, along with three of its tributaries, Bilaine and Ruisseau du Val

== Places of Interest ==
To the North of the village is an old quarry that is registered as a Zone naturelle d'intérêt écologique, faunistique et floristique. The Quarry contains the only known population of Polytrichum pallidisetum, a type of Hair cap moss, in Lower Normandy and the rare reindeer cup lichen

== Population ==
Historical population
Year	Pop.	±% p.a.
1968	127	—
1975	111	−1.91%
1982	128	+2.06%
1990	147	+1.75%
1999	159	+0.88%
2007	128	−2.67%
2012	142	+2.10%
2017	154	+1.64%
2023	154	+0.00%
Source: INSEE

== See also ==
- Communes of the Calvados department
