= Aubigny, Calvados =

Aubigny
- Commune
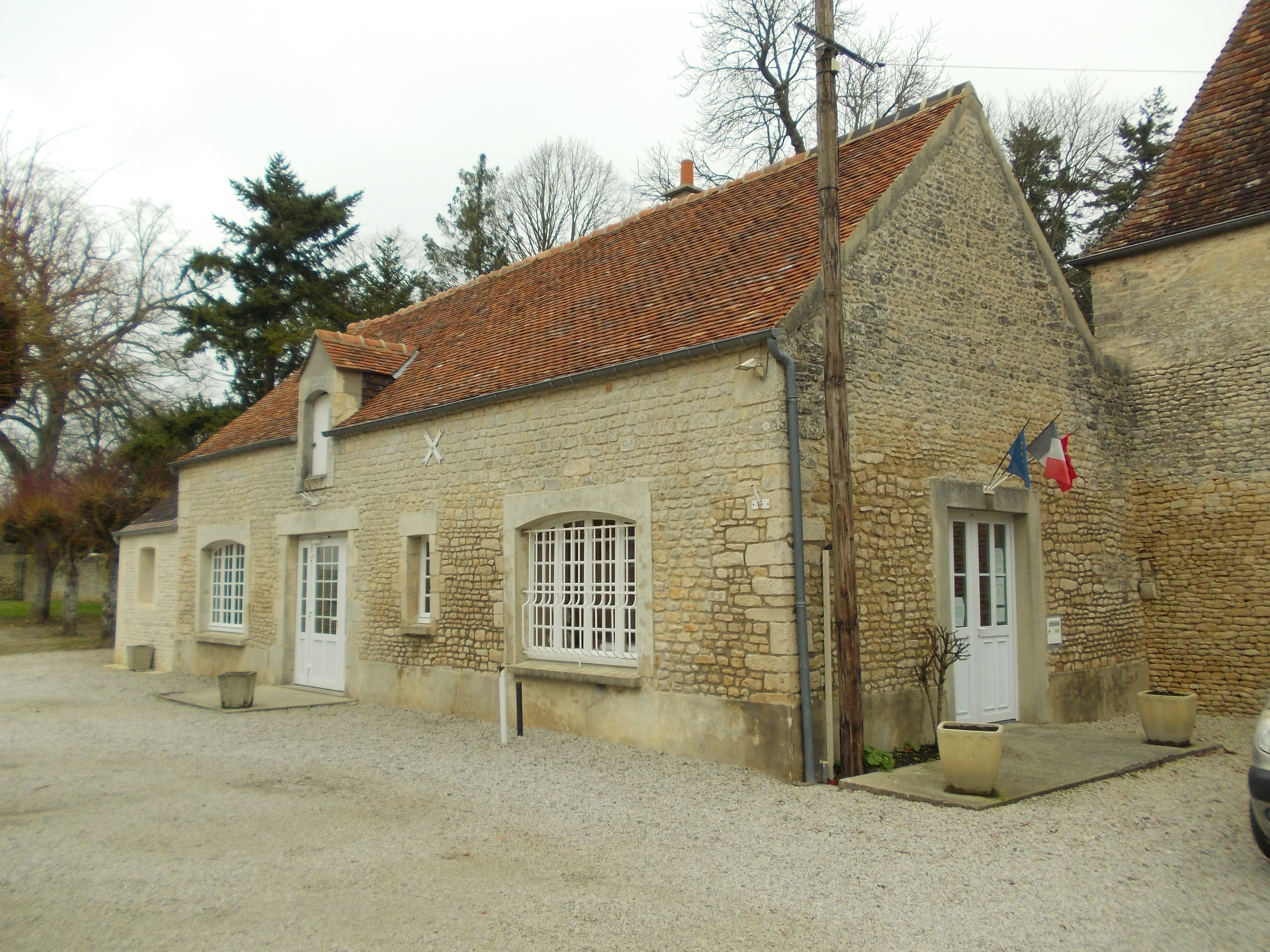
- Aubigny Town Hall
- Location of Aubigny
- Location within France Location within Normandy
- Coordinates: 48°55′08″N 0°12′49″W
- Country: France
- Region: Normandy
- Department: Calvados
- Arrondissement: Caen
- Canton: Falaise
- Intercommunality: Pays de Falaise

Government
  - Mayor (2020–2026): Michel Lecapitaine
- Area^{1}: 5.02 km^{2} (1.94 sq mi)
- Elevation: 150 m (490 ft)
- Highest elevation: 206 m (676 ft)
- Lowest elevation: 145 m (476 ft)
- Population (2023): 291
  - Density: 58.0/km^{2} (150/sq mi)
- Time zone: UTC+01:00 (CET)
  - Summer (DST): UTC+02:00 (CEST)
- INSEE/Postal code: 14025 /14700
- ^{1} French Land Register data, which excludes lakes, ponds, glaciers > 1 km^{2} (0.386 sq mi or 247 acres) and river estuaries.

Aubigny (French pronunciation: [obiɲi]) is a commune in the Calvados department in the Normandy region of north-western France.

== Geography ==
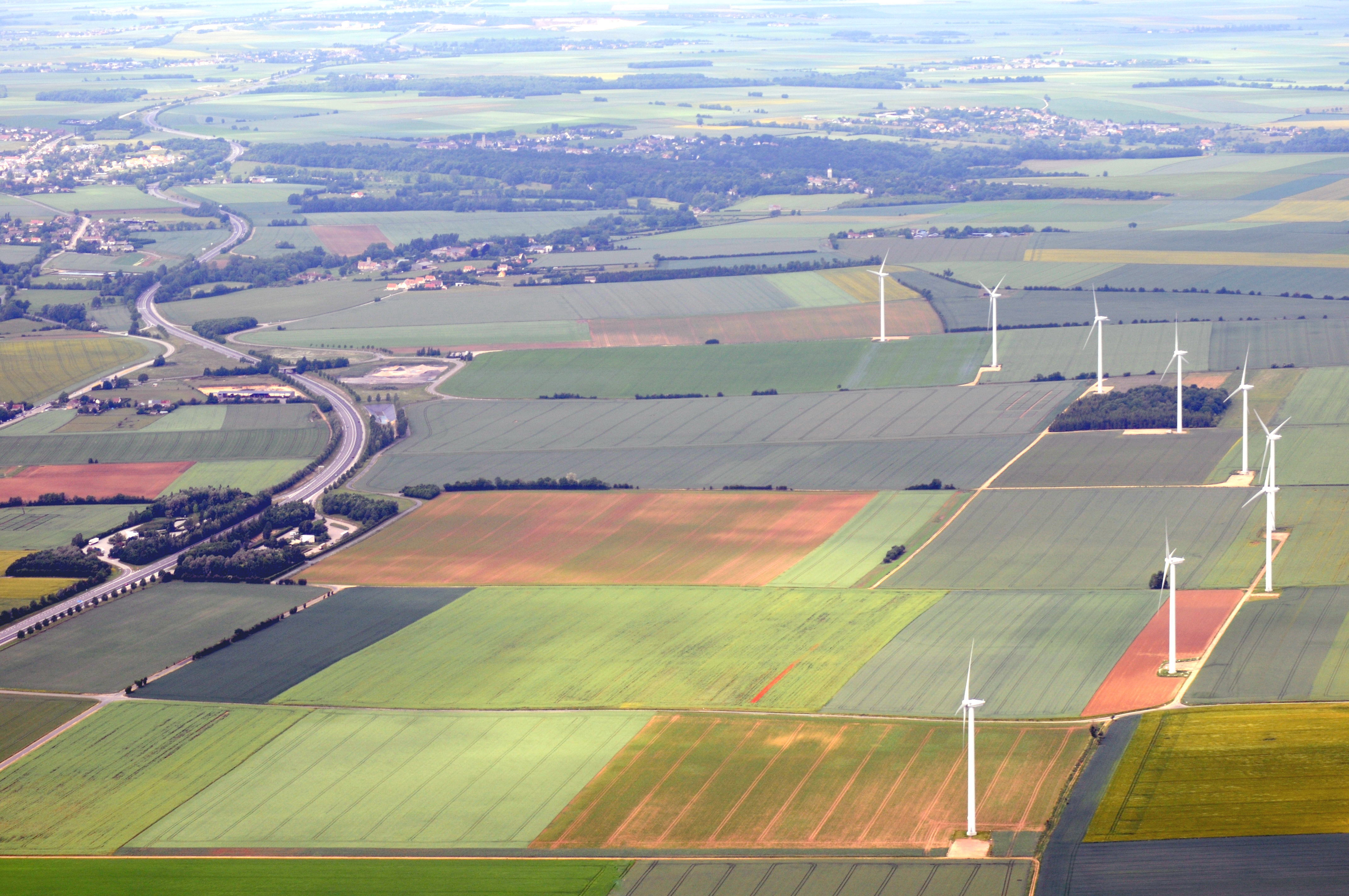
The N158 in Aubigny. The windfarm is also in Aubigny

Aubigny is located some 26 km south by south-east of Caen, 27 km north by north-east of Argentan and 3 km north of Falaise. Access to the commune is by Route nationale N158 from Caen which becomes the A88 autoroute west of Falaise and has Exit 10 on the southern border of the commune. Access to the village is by the D658 from Soulangy in the north passing south through the commune and the village, connecting with the N158 south of the village, and continuing to Falaise in the south. The D6 comes from Villers-Canivet in the north-west and passes through the west of the commune before joining the N158 just south of the commune. Apart from the village there are the hamlets of Le Chateau, Les Bruyeres, and Long Pre. There is some forest in the south near Long Pre and the rest of the commune is entirely farmland.

The Ruisseau du Cassis flows north through the commune forming a small section of the north-western border before continuing north to join the Laizon north of Soulangy. The Ruisseau du Chateau de Long Pre comes from the south and feeds the moat around the chateau.

== History ==
Before the French Revolution the parish was part of the Diocese of Séez of the archdeaconry of Hiémois. It was the seat of a Deanery which grouped a number of parishes west of Falaise.

== Administration ==
List of Successive Mayors

From	To	Name	Party	Position
	2001	Jean Gilot		
2001	2026	Michel Lecapitaine		EDF agent

=== Twinning ===
Aubigny has twinning associations with:

- Stoke Mandeville (United Kingdom) since 1952.

== Demography ==
The inhabitants of the commune are known as Albinéains or Albinéaines in French.

Historical population

Year	Pop.	±% p.a.
1793	370	—
1821	337	−0.33%
1846	423	+0.91%
1872	364	−0.58%
1901	327	−0.37%
1926	231	−1.38%
1946	333	+1.85%
1962	300	−0.65%
1968	318	+0.98%

Year	Pop.	±% p.a.
1975	289	−1.36%
1982	266	−1.18%
1990	295	+1.30%
1999	316	+0.77%
2007	341	+0.96%
2012	294	−2.92%
2017	308	+0.93%
2023	291	−0.94%

Source: EHESS and INSEE

== Culture and heritage ==
=== Civil heritage ===
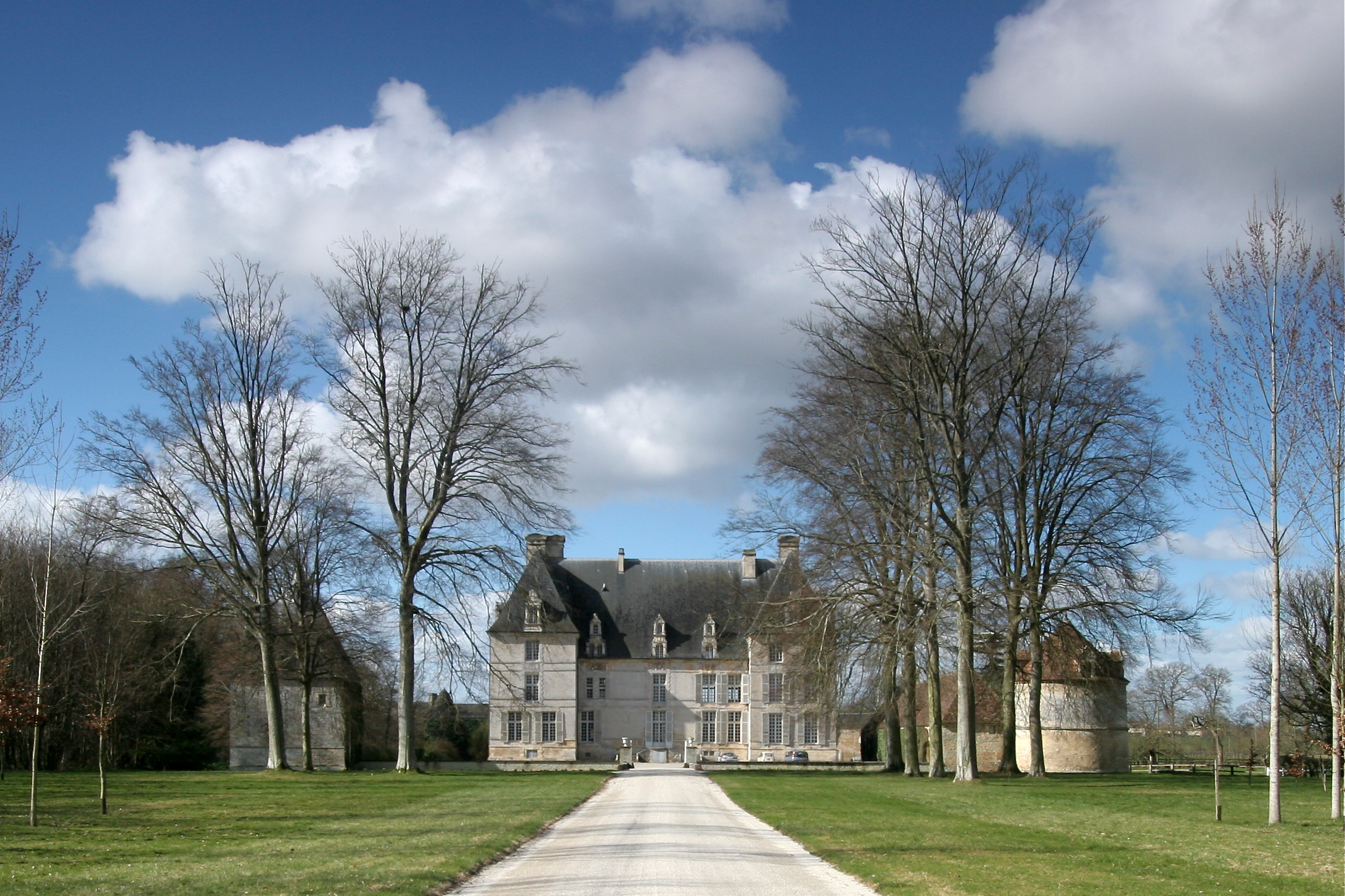
The Chateau of Aubigny

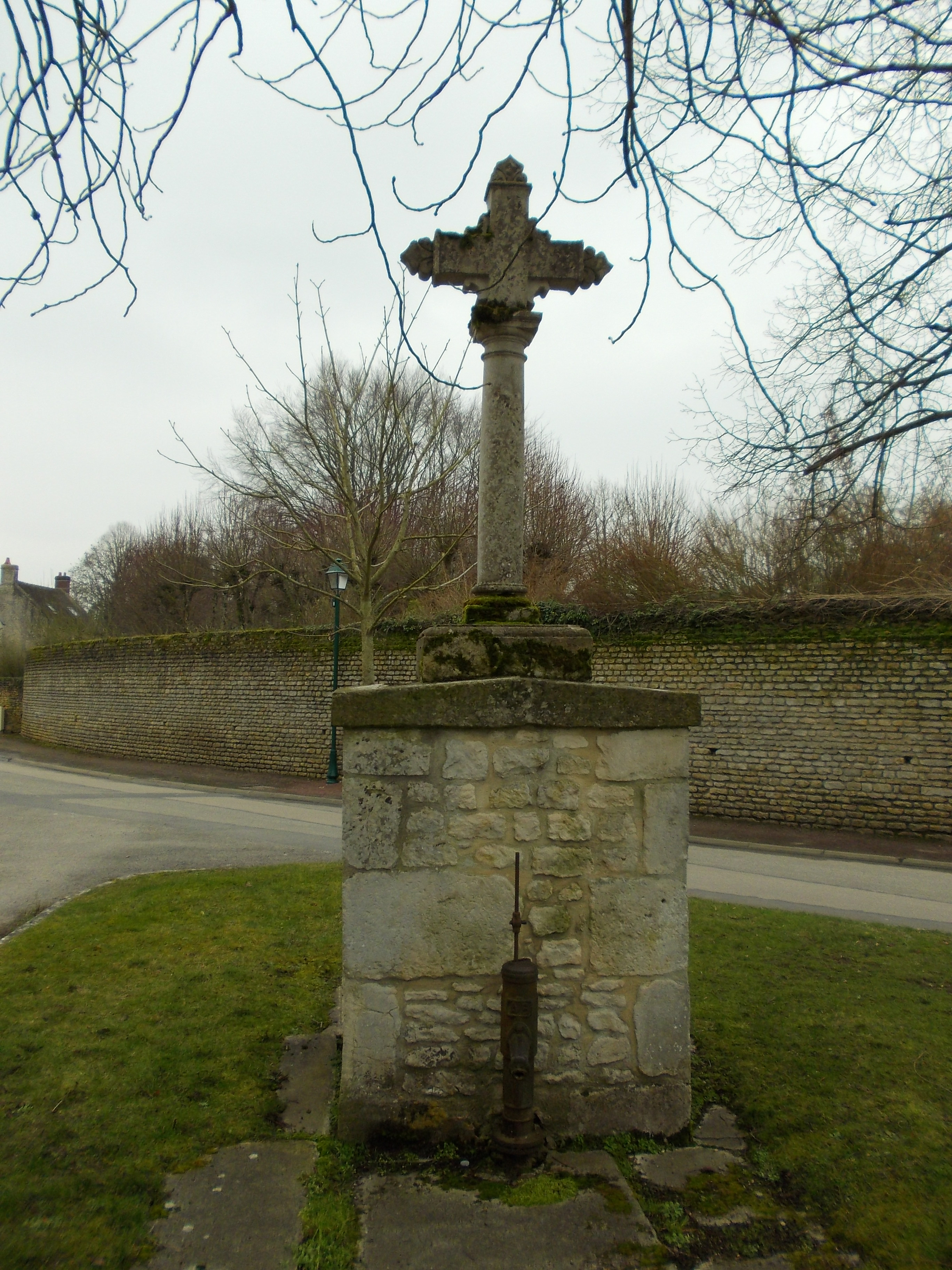
The Well and Wayside Cross

The commune has a number of buildings and structures that are registered as historical monuments:

- The Chateau of Aubigny (16th century)
- Houses and Farms (17th-19th centuries)
- The Chateau of Long Pré (1752)
- A Chateau at Le Chateau (17th century)
- The Town Hall/School (1850)
- A Well and Wayside Cross (19th century)

=== Religious heritage ===
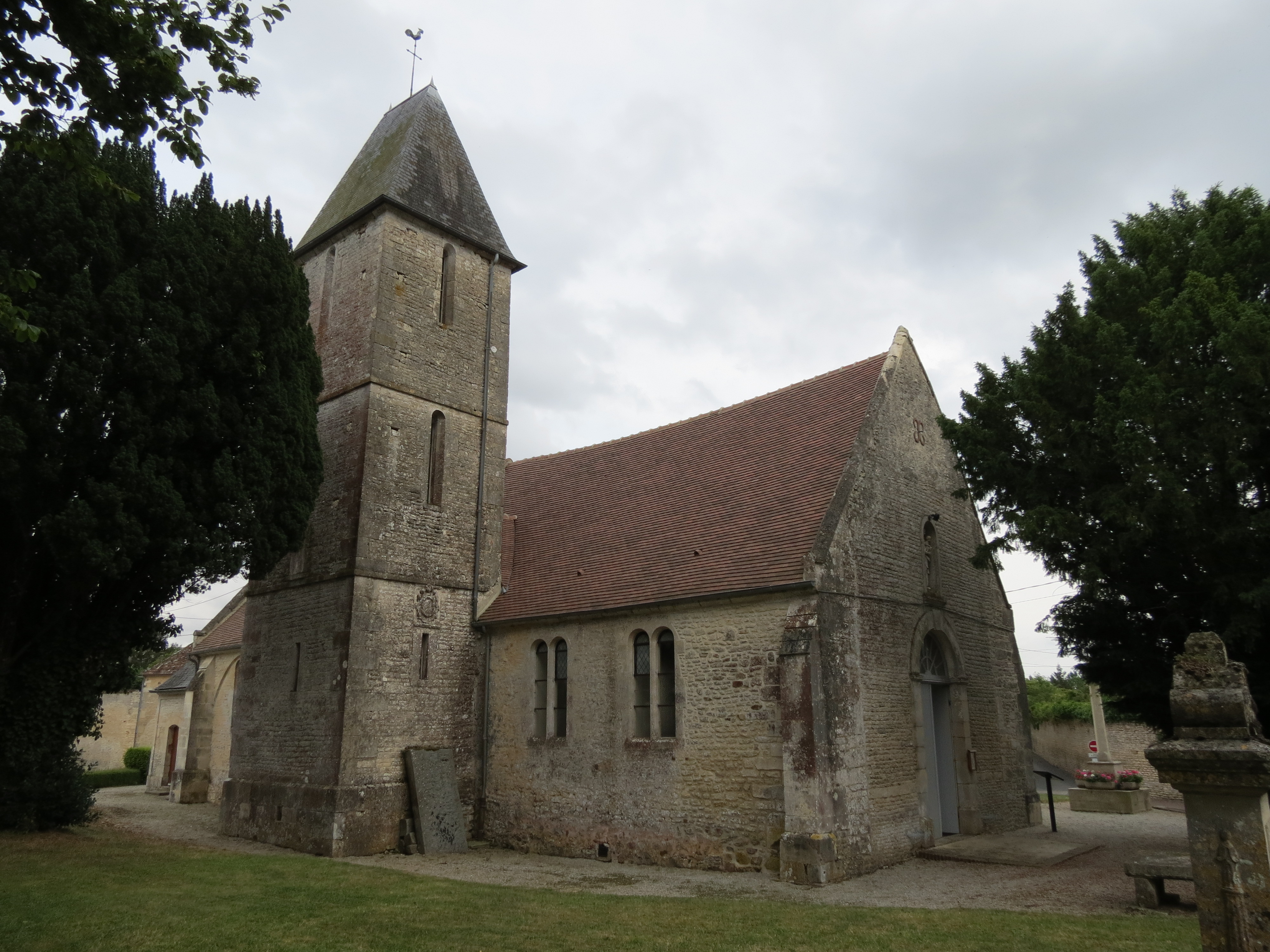
The Church of Notre-Dame-de-la-Visitation

Two buildings and structures are registered as historical monuments:

- A Cemetery Cross (1804)
- The Church of Notre-Dame-de-la-Visitation (18th century)

The Church contains many items that are registered as historical objects:

- A Statue (kneeling):Prayer of Marc-Antoine of Morell (1724)
- A Statue (kneeling):Prayer of Raven of Morell (1625)
- A Statue (kneeling):Prayer of Jules Marc-Antoine of Morell (1786)
- A Statue (kneeling):Prayer of Jean Marc-Antoine of Morell (1777)
- A Statue (kneeling):Prayer of Brandelis of Morell (1662)
- A Statue (kneeling):Prayer of Antoine of Morell (1673)
- A Choir enclosure (Communion Table) (16th century)
- 6 Kneeling statues of the Lords of Aubigny (17th-18th centuries)
- A Painting: the Transfiguration (17th century)
- A Painting: the Judgement of Solomon (17th century)
- A Statue: Saint Guérin (17th century)
- A Pulpit (18th century)
- 2 Altars and Retables (1855)
- Altar, Retable, and Tabernacle (19th century)
- A Choir enclosure (Communion Table) (16th century)
- A Reliquary (18th century)
- A Chalice (1850)
- A Chalice (1) (1819)
- A Painting: The Baptism of Christ (1658)
- 2 Statues: Virgin and Child, Saint Joseph (1700)
- A Tomb Statue (kneeling): Prayer of Jules Marc-Antoine of Morell (1786)
- A Tomb Statue (kneeling): Prayer of Jean Marc-Antoine of Morell (1777)
- A Tomb Statue (kneeling): Prayer of Marc-Antoine of Morell (1724)
- A Tomb Statue (kneeling): Prayer of Antoine of Morell (1673)
- A Tomb Statue (kneeling): Prayer of Brandelis of Morell (1662)
- A Tomb Statue (kneeling): Prayer of Raven of Morell (1625)
- 6 Tomb Statues (kneeling): Prayer of the Lords of Aubigny (1625–1786)
- A Cabinet (1800)
- A pair of Stalls (1800)
- 2 Tombstones: Raven of Morell and Gabrielle of Riant (1587 & 1592)

=== Festival ===
A Garage sale is held at the beginning of September.

== Points of Interest ==
- Anciennes carrières souterraines de Saint-Pierre-Canivet et d'Aubigny is a Natura 2000 site, shared between Aubigny and neighbouring Saint-Pierre-Canivet. It is a former underground quarry that houses a number of protected species of bats, Geoffroy's bat, Greater mouse-eared bat, Greater horseshoe bat, and the Lesser horseshoe bat. The area is closed to the public.

== See also ==
- Communes of the Calvados department
