= Soumont-Saint-Quentin =

- Commune
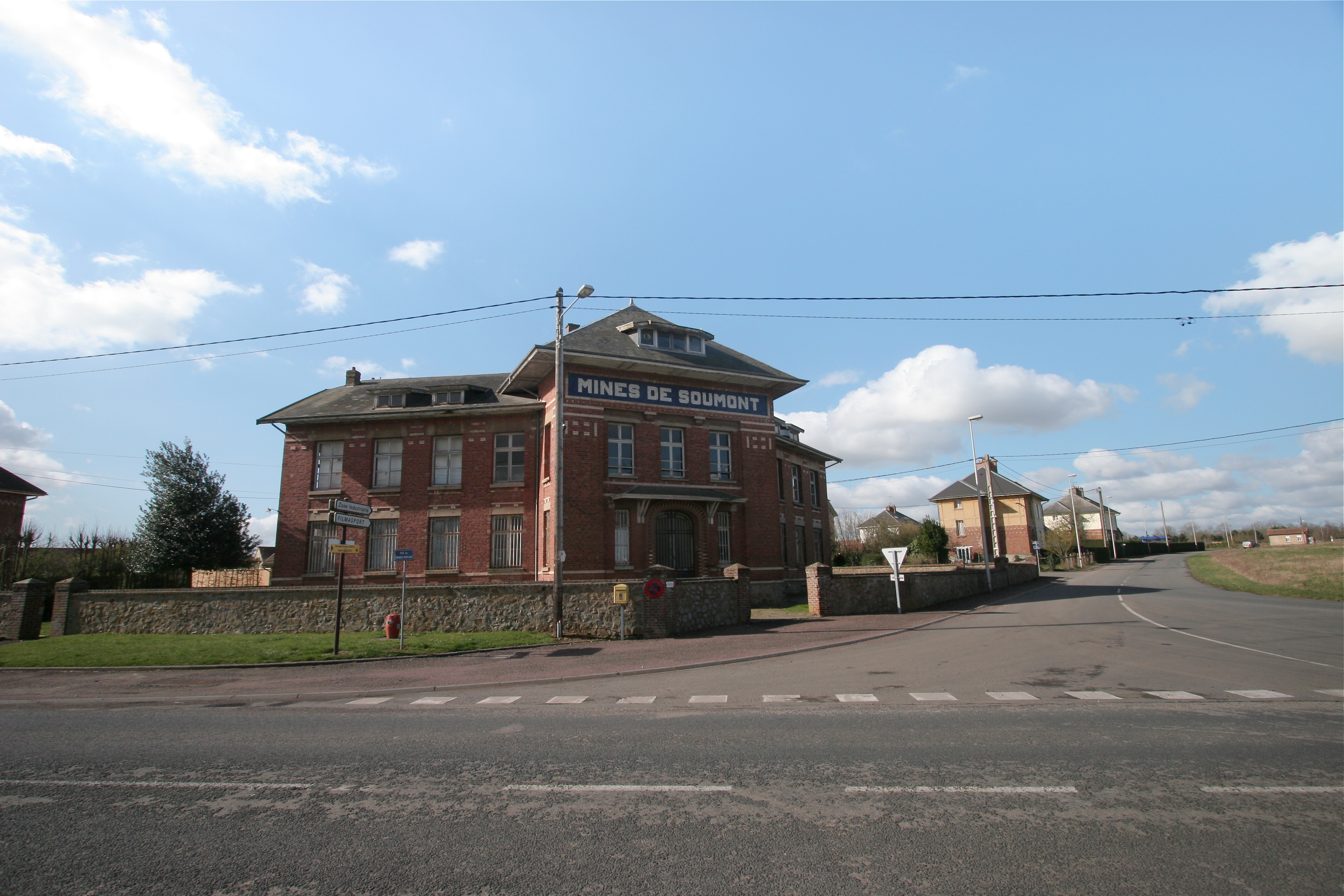
- Mines office
- Location of Soumont-Saint-Quentin
- Location within France Location within Normandy
- Coordinates: 48°58′44″N 0°13′51″W
- Country: France
- Region: Normandy
- Department: Calvados
- Arrondissement: Caen
- Canton: Falaise
- Intercommunality: Pays de Falaise

Government
  - Mayor (2020–2026): Laure Meudec
- Area^{1}: 6.87 km^{2} (2.65 sq mi)
- Elevation: 165 m (541 ft)
- Highest elevation: 194 m (636 ft)
- Lowest elevation: 93 m (305 ft)
- Population (2023): 659
  - Density: 95.9/km^{2} (248/sq mi)
- Time zone: UTC+01:00 (CET)
  - Summer (DST): UTC+02:00 (CEST)
- INSEE/Postal code: 14678 /14420
- ^{1} French Land Register data, which excludes lakes, ponds, glaciers > 1 km^{2} (0.386 sq mi or 247 acres) and river estuaries.

Soumont-Saint-Quentin (French pronunciation: [sumɔ̃ sɛ̃ kɑ̃tɛ̃]) is a commune in the Calvados department in the Normandy region in northwestern France.

== Geography ==
The commune is made up of the following collection of villages and hamlets, Aisy, La Mine, Le Mont Joly and Soumont-Saint-Quentin.

The river Laizon is the only watercourse that flows through the commune.

== Population ==
Historical population
Year	Pop.	±% p.a.
1968	593	—
1975	579	−0.34%
1982	561	−0.45%
1990	530	−0.71%
1999	480	−1.09%
2007	558	+1.90%
2012	530	−1.02%
2017	542	+0.45%
2023	659	+3.31%
Source: INSEE

== Points of Interest ==
- La Brèche au Diable known in English as the Devil's Breach is a set of two rocky outcrops overlooking the Laizon river. It is shared with the neighbouring commune of Potigny.

=== National Heritage sites ===
The commune has five sites listed as a Monument historique.

- Église Saint-Quentin de Soumont-Saint-Quentin - a twelfth century church, listed as a Monument historique in 1910.
- Église d'Aizy - a thirteenth century church, listed as a Monument historique in 1911.
- Chapelle du Mont-Joly - a thirteenth century chapel, listed as a Monument historique in 1927.
- Tomb of Marie Joly and its enclosure - an eighteenth century tomb for Marie Elisabeth Joly, sculpted by Jacques-Philippe Le Sueur for listed as a Monument historique in 1927.
- Menhirs des Longraisa set of three Neolithic Menhirs listed as a monument in 1978.

== Notable people ==
- Marie-Élisabeth Joly - (1761 - 1798) a French stage actress, who was engaged at the Comédie-Française in 1781. She is buried here and her tomb is now a listed monument.

== See also ==
- Communes of the Calvados department
