= Potigny =

- Commune
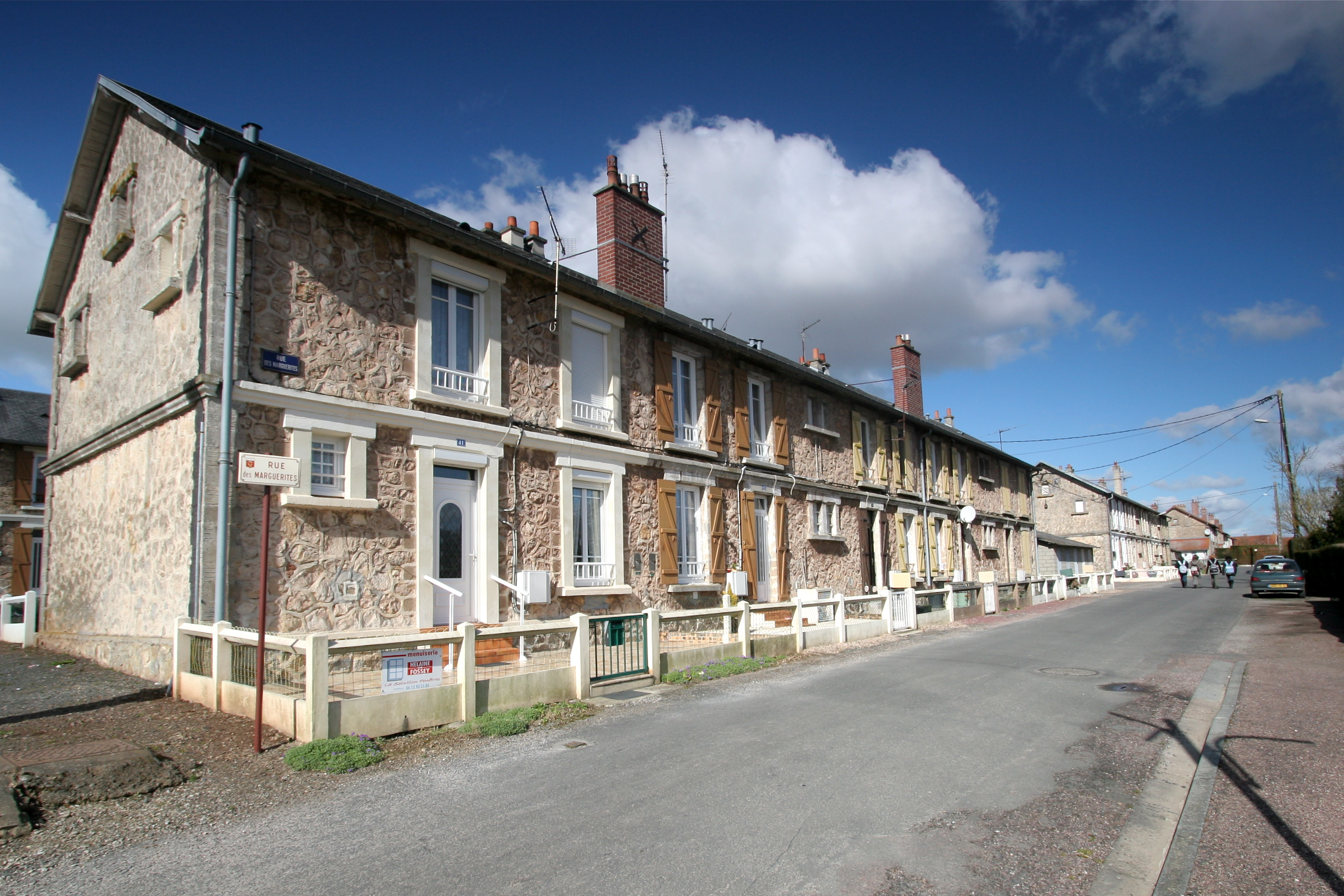
- Miners' houses

- Coat of arms
- Location of Potigny
- Location within France Location within Normandy
- Coordinates: 48°58′19″N 0°14′48″W
- Country: France
- Region: Normandy
- Department: Calvados
- Arrondissement: Caen
- Canton: Falaise
- Intercommunality: Pays de Falaise

Government
  - Mayor (2020–2026): Gérard Kepa
- Area^{1}: 4.26 km^{2} (1.64 sq mi)
- Highest elevation: 206 m (676 ft)
- Lowest elevation: 125 m (410 ft)
- Population (2023): 2,089
  - Density: 490/km^{2} (1,270/sq mi)
- Time zone: UTC+01:00 (CET)
  - Summer (DST): UTC+02:00 (CEST)
- INSEE/Postal code: 14516 /14420
- ^{1} French Land Register data, which excludes lakes, ponds, glaciers > 1 km^{2} (0.386 sq mi or 247 acres) and river estuaries.

Potigny (French pronunciation: [pɔtiɲi]) is a commune in the Calvados department in the Normandy region in northwestern France.

== Geography ==
The commune is made up of the following collection of villages and hamlets, La Brèche au Diable and Potigny.

The river Laizon is the only watercourse that flows through the commune.

== Population ==
Historical population

Year	Pop.	±% p.a.
1793	375	—
1851	402	+0.12%
1896	271	−0.87%
1901	239	−2.48%
1906	223	−1.38%
1911	451	+15.13%
1921	1,473	+12.56%
1926	1,731	+3.28%
1931	2,742	+9.64%
1936	2,420	−2.47%
1946	2,403	−0.07%

Year	Pop.	±% p.a.
1954	2,694	+1.44%
1962	2,926	+1.04%
1968	2,720	−1.21%
1975	2,408	−1.73%
1982	2,120	−1.80%
1990	1,776	−2.19%
1999	1,703	−0.47%
2007	1,734	+0.23%
2012	1,886	+1.69%
2017	2,075	+1.93%
2023	2,089	+0.11%

Source: EHESS and INSEE (1968-2023)

== Points of Interest ==
- La Brèche au Diable known in English as the Devil's Breach is a set of two rocky outcrops overlooking the Laizon river. It is shared with the neighbouring commune of Soumont-Saint-Quentin.

=== National Heritage sites ===
- Église Notre-Dame-du-Rosaire de Potigny a thirteenth century church that was listed as a Monument historique in 1930.

== Notable people ==
- Maurice De Muer - (1921 - 2012) a professional cyclist and cycling team manager was born here.

== Twin towns – sister cities ==
Potigny is twinned with:

- (England) - Banwell since 1999.
- (Poland) - Jutrosin since 1993.

== See also ==
- Communes of the Calvados department
