= Les Isles-Bardel =

- Commune
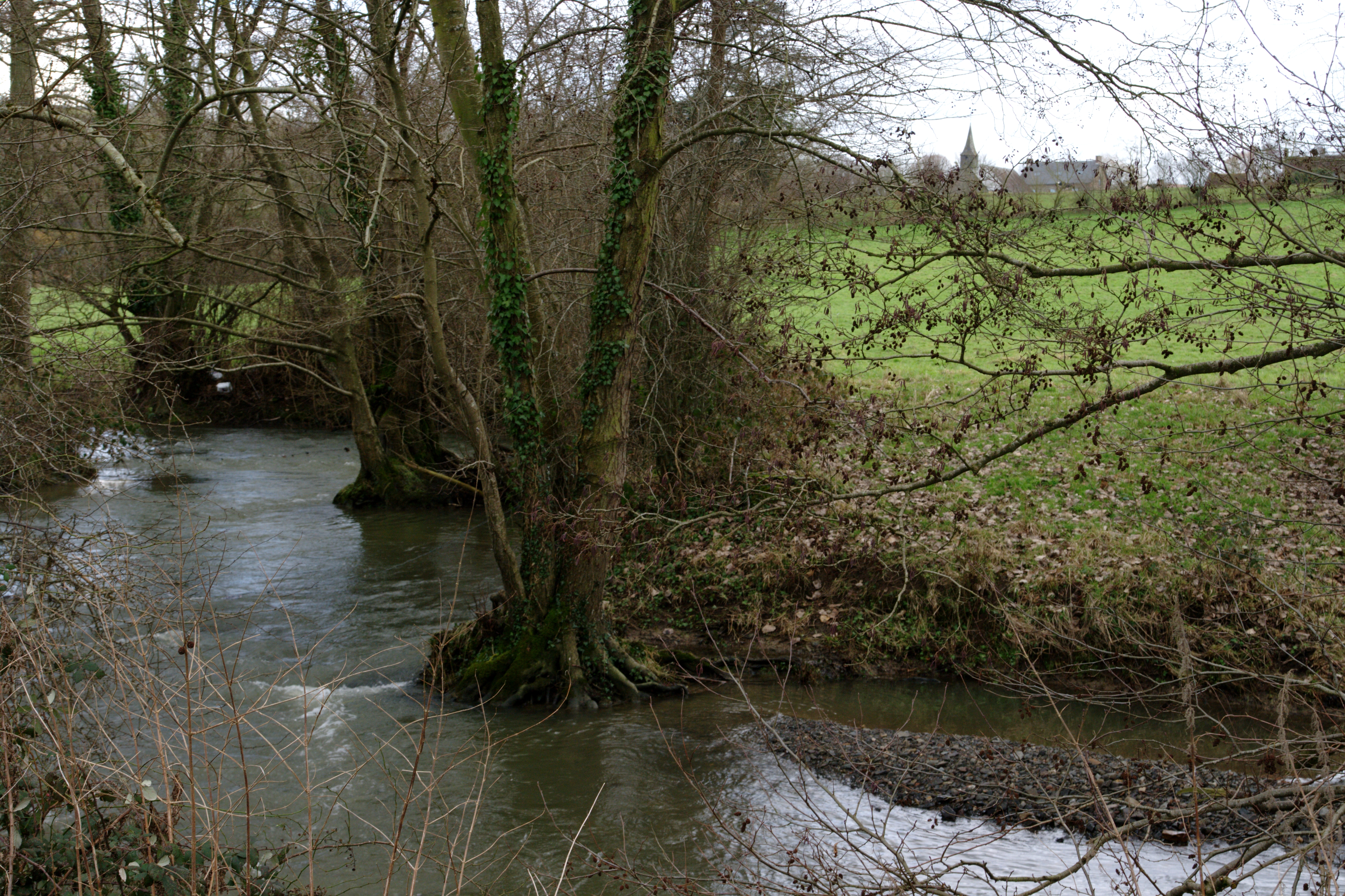
- The river Baize
- Location of Les Isles-Bardel
- Location within France Location within Normandy
- Coordinates: 48°50′46″N 0°20′14″W
- Country: France
- Region: Normandy
- Department: Calvados
- Arrondissement: Caen
- Canton: Falaise
- Intercommunality: Pays de Falaise

Government
  - Mayor (2020–2026): Jacques Garigue
- Area^{1}: 5.69 km^{2} (2.20 sq mi)
- Elevation: 110 m (360 ft)
- Highest elevation: 194 m (636 ft)
- Lowest elevation: 54 m (177 ft)
- Population (2023): 73
  - Density: 13/km^{2} (33/sq mi)
- Time zone: UTC+01:00 (CET)
  - Summer (DST): UTC+02:00 (CEST)
- INSEE/Postal code: 14343 /14690
- ^{1} French Land Register data, which excludes lakes, ponds, glaciers > 1 km^{2} (0.386 sq mi or 247 acres) and river estuaries.

Les Isles-Bardel (French pronunciation: [le.z‿il baʁdɛl]) is a commune in the Calvados department in the Normandy region in northwestern France. The commune is where the Baize joins the river Orne.

== Geography ==
The commune of Les Isles-Bardel is part of the area known as Suisse Normande.

The commune is made up of the following collection of villages and hamlets, Les Isles-Bardel, La Courbe and La Bardellière.

The Commune with another 20 communes shares part of a 2,115 hectare, Natura 2000 conservation area, called the Vallée de l'Orne et ses affluents.

The commune is where the river Baize feeds into the river Orne.

== Population ==
Historical population
Year	Pop.	±% p.a.
1968	101	—
1975	80	−3.28%
1982	64	−3.14%
1990	42	−5.13%
1999	58	+3.65%
2007	64	+1.24%
2012	66	+0.62%
2017	64	−0.61%
2023	73	+2.22%
Source: INSEE

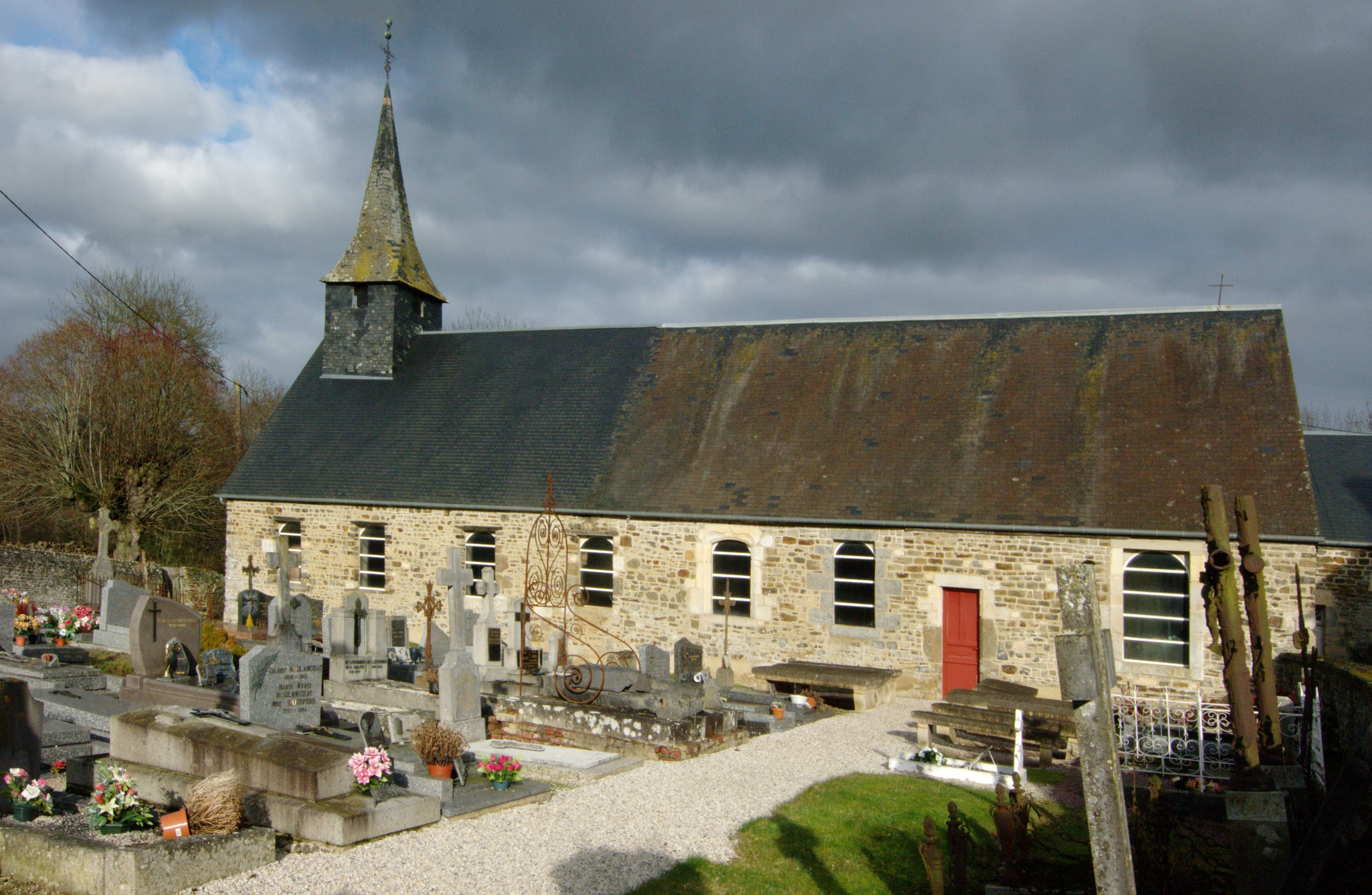
The Church of Les Isles Bardel

== See also ==
- Communes of the Calvados department
