= Épaney =

- Commune
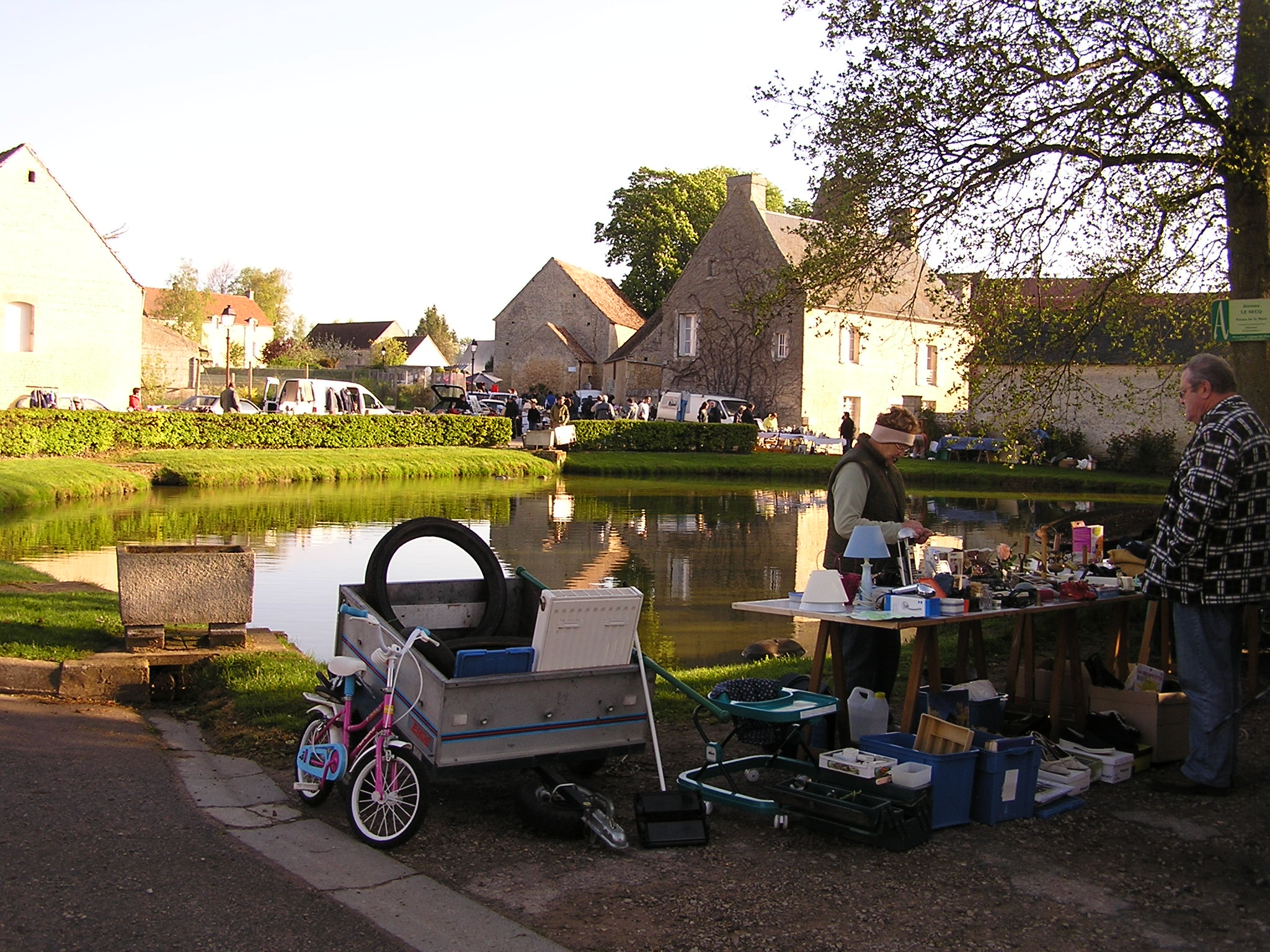
- May fair around the pond
- Location of Épaney
- Location within France Location within Normandy
- Coordinates: 48°56′55″N 0°10′02″W
- Country: France
- Region: Normandy
- Department: Calvados
- Arrondissement: Caen
- Canton: Falaise
- Intercommunality: Pays de Falaise

Government
  - Mayor (2020–2026): Bruno Duguey
- Area^{1}: 11.59 km^{2} (4.47 sq mi)
- Elevation: 110 m (360 ft)
- Highest elevation: 166 m (545 ft)
- Lowest elevation: 72 m (236 ft)
- Population (2023): 488
  - Density: 42.1/km^{2} (109/sq mi)
- Time zone: UTC+01:00 (CET)
  - Summer (DST): UTC+02:00 (CEST)
- INSEE/Postal code: 14240 /14170
- ^{1} French Land Register data, which excludes lakes, ponds, glaciers > 1 km^{2} (0.386 sq mi or 247 acres) and river estuaries.

Épaney (French pronunciation: [epanɛ]) is a commune in the Calvados department in the Normandy region in northwestern France. Jehan Le Saulx d'Espanney, the 16th-century French playwright, was born in the village.

== Geography ==
The commune is made up of the following collection of villages and hamlets, Fontaine, La Queue de Renard and Épaney.

The river Perrières flows through the commune.

== Population ==
Historical population
Year	Pop.	±% p.a.
1968	305	—
1975	270	−1.73%
1982	302	+1.61%
1990	352	+1.93%
1999	315	−1.23%
2007	428	+3.91%
2012	514	+3.73%
2017	514	+0.00%
2023	488	−0.86%
Source: INSEE

== Notable people ==
Jehan Le Saulx d'Espanney (Born 16th century -died 17th century) a French playwright was born here.

== See also ==
- Communes of the Calvados department
