= Versainville =

- Commune
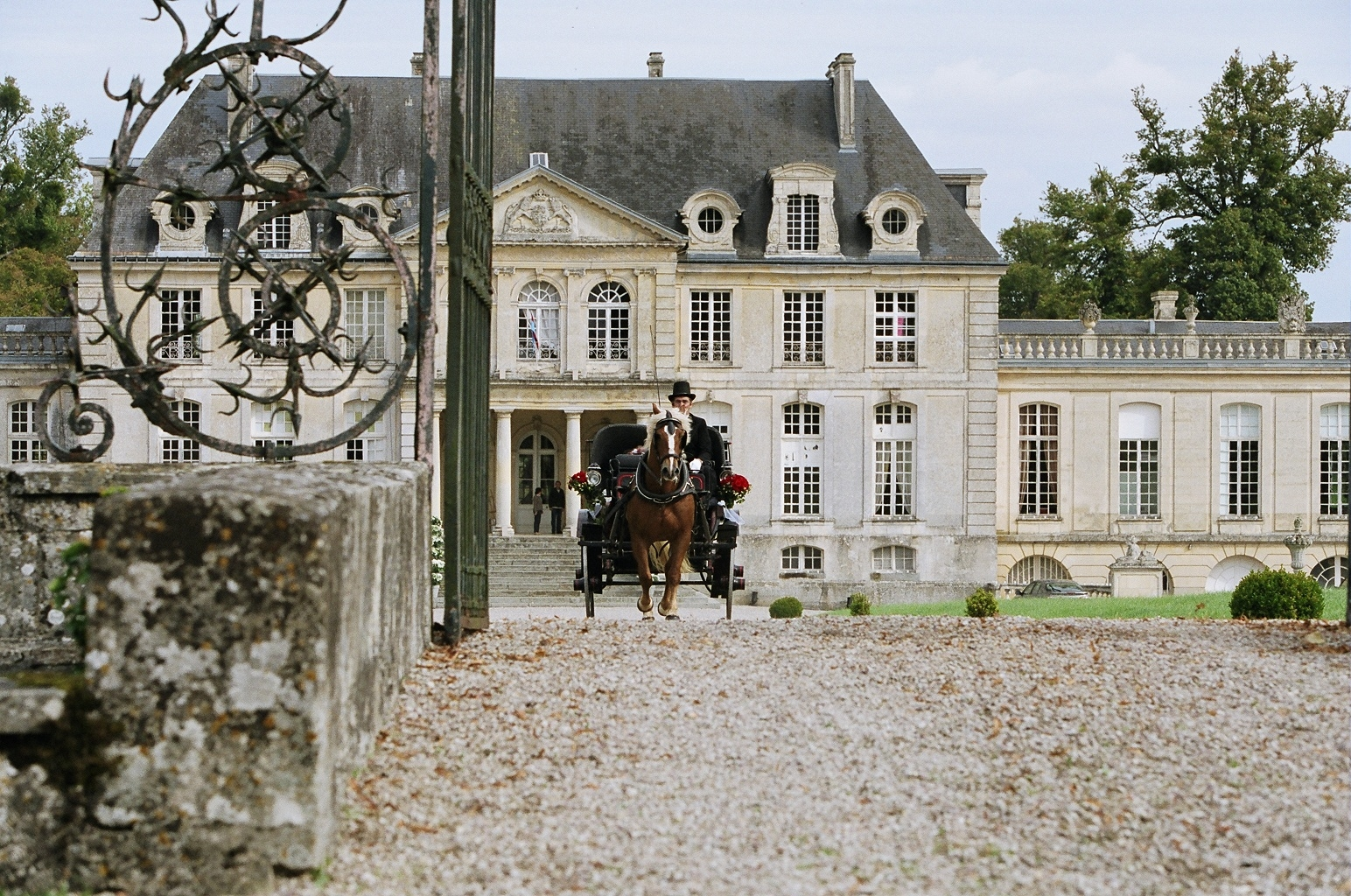
- Chateau
- Location of Versainville
- Location within France Location within Normandy
- Coordinates: 48°55′03″N 0°10′37″W
- Country: France
- Region: Normandy
- Department: Calvados
- Arrondissement: Caen
- Canton: Falaise
- Intercommunality: Pays de Falaise

Government
  - Mayor (2020–2026): Sébastien Binet
- Area^{1}: 7.70 km^{2} (2.97 sq mi)
- Highest elevation: 166 m (545 ft)
- Lowest elevation: 70 m (230 ft)
- Population (2023): 520
  - Density: 68/km^{2} (170/sq mi)
- Time zone: UTC+01:00 (CET)
  - Summer (DST): UTC+02:00 (CEST)
- INSEE/Postal code: 14737 /14700
- ^{1} French Land Register data, which excludes lakes, ponds, glaciers > 1 km^{2} (0.386 sq mi or 247 acres) and river estuaries.

Versainville (French pronunciation: [vɛʁsɛ̃vil]) is a commune in the Calvados department in the Normandy region in northwestern France.

== Geography ==
The commune is made up of the following collection of villages and hamlets, Le Dernier Sou, Le Bourg Neuf, La Chapelle and Versainville.

The river Ante flows through the commune.

== Population ==
Historical population
Year	Pop.	±% p.a.
1968	274	—
1975	247	−1.47%
1982	274	+1.49%
1990	328	+2.27%
1999	389	+1.91%
2007	402	+0.41%
2012	417	+0.74%
2017	469	+2.38%
2023	520	+1.74%
Source: INSEE

== Points of Interest ==
- Réserve naturelle du Coteau de Mesnil-Soleil is a 25 hectare National nature reserve of France which is shared with the neighbouring commune of Damblainville.

=== National heritage sites ===
- Château de Versainville - is an eighteenth century chateau that was listed as a Monument historique in 1932.

== See also ==
- Communes of the Calvados department
