= Marie-Élisabeth Joly =

French actress (1761–1798)

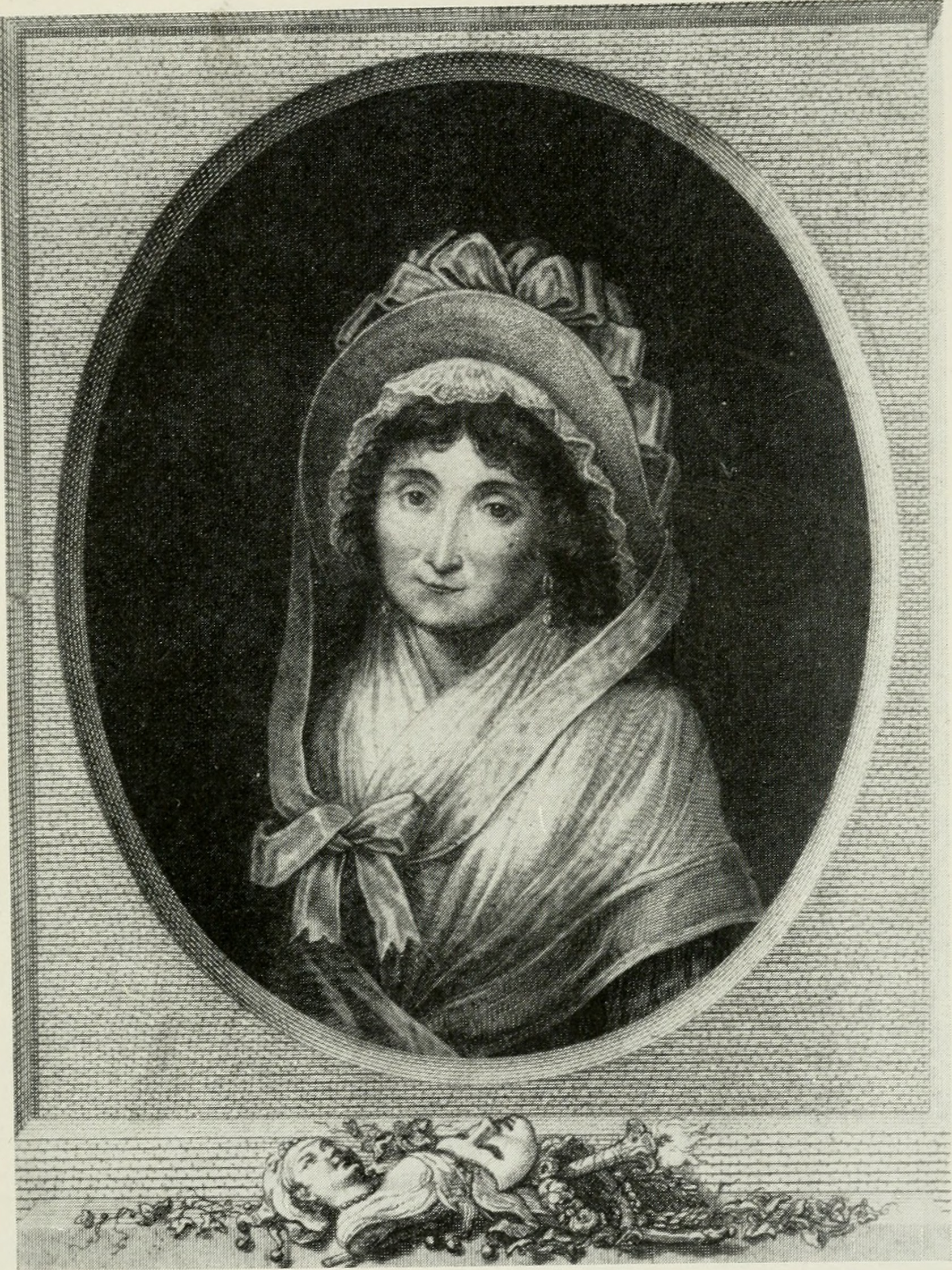
- Marie-Élisabeth Joly
- Born: 8 April 1761; Versailles
- Died: 5 May 1798 (aged 37); Paris
- Resting place: Soumont-Saint-Quentin
- Occupation: actress
- Employer: Comédie-Française

Marie-Élisabeth Joly (1761 – 1798), was a French stage actress.

She was engaged at the Comédie-Française in 1781. She became a Sociétaires of the Comédie-Française in 1783.

She had a successful career and was particularly noted for her roles as a soubrette. She was popular among the audience and her premature death from a chest infection aroused much public sympathy.
