= Rapilly =

- Commune
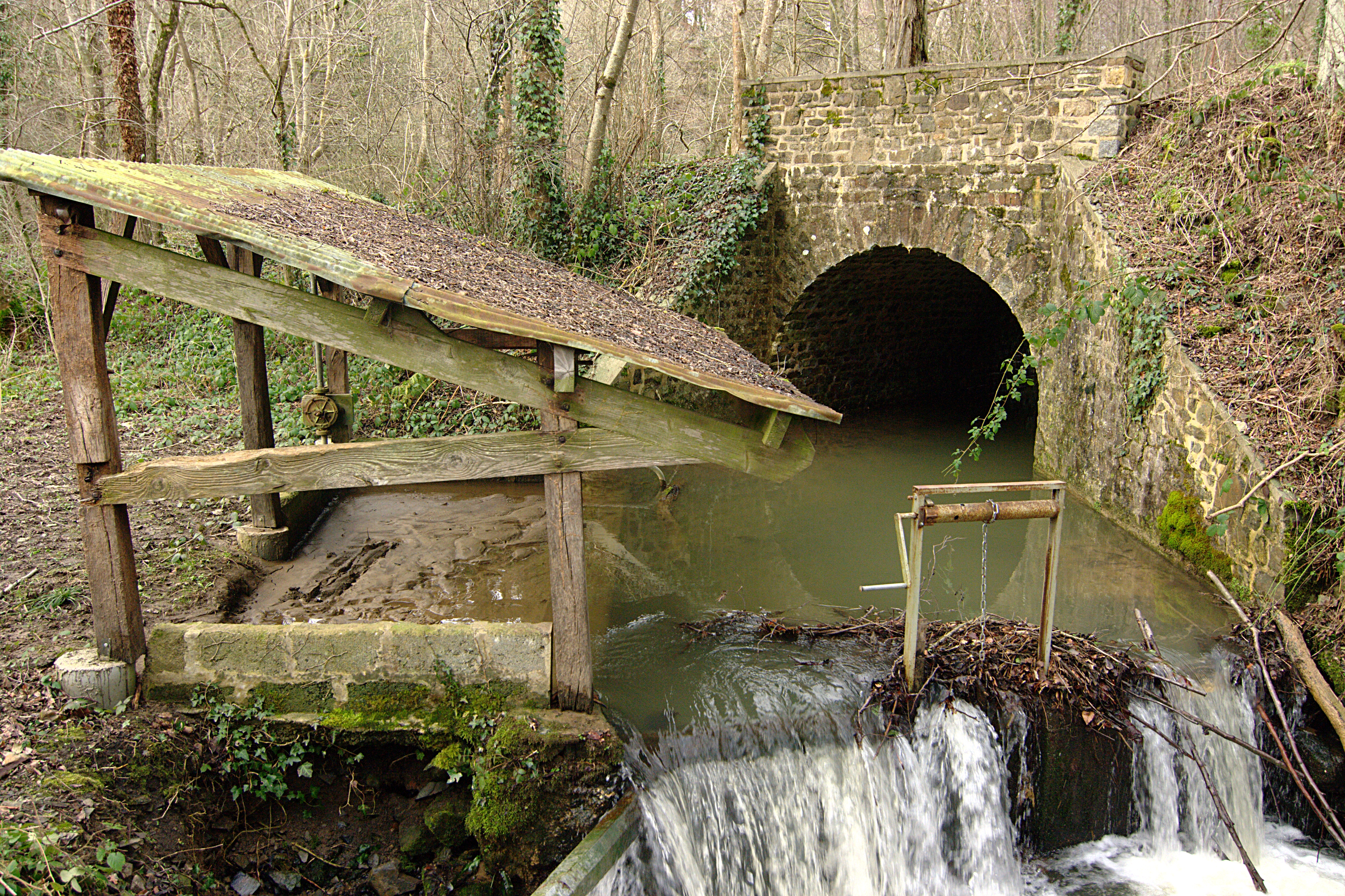
- The washhouse in Rapilly
- Location of Rapilly
- Location within France Location within Normandy
- Coordinates: 48°51′28″N 0°20′00″W
- Country: France
- Region: Normandy
- Department: Calvados
- Arrondissement: Caen
- Canton: Falaise
- Intercommunality: Pays de Falaise

Government
  - Mayor (2020–2026): Françoise Jurkiewicz
- Area^{1}: 4.19 km^{2} (1.62 sq mi)
- Elevation: 118 m (387 ft)
- Highest elevation: 222 m (728 ft)
- Lowest elevation: 54 m (177 ft)
- Population (2023): 44
  - Density: 11/km^{2} (27/sq mi)
- Time zone: UTC+01:00 (CET)
  - Summer (DST): UTC+02:00 (CEST)
- INSEE/Postal code: 14531 /14690
- ^{1} French Land Register data, which excludes lakes, ponds, glaciers > 1 km^{2} (0.386 sq mi or 247 acres) and river estuaries.

Rapilly is a commune in the Calvados department in the Normandy région in northwestern France. The commune is where the Baize joins the river Orne.

== Geography ==
The commune of Rapilly is part of the area known as Suisse Normande.

The Commune with another 20 communes shares part of a 2,115 hectare, Natura 2000 conservation area, called the Vallée de l'Orne et ses affluents.

The commune is where the river Baize feeds into the river Orne.

== Population ==
Historical population
Year	Pop.	±% p.a.
1968	55	—
1975	51	−1.07%
1982	51	+0.00%
1990	46	−1.28%
1999	47	+0.24%
2007	41	−1.69%
2012	47	+2.77%
2017	47	+0.00%
2023	44	−1.09%
Source: INSEE

== See also ==
- Communes of the Calvados department
