= Jehan Le Saulx d'Espanney =

French playwright

- Born: Jehan Le Saulx; Épaney
- Known for: writer

Jehan Le Saulx d'Espanney, born in the second half of the 16th century was a French playwright from Épaney (Calvados).

He wrote a unique tragedy, in three days according to him, L'Adamantine ou le Désespoir (Rouen, Raphaël du Petit-Val, 1608) : Darimant loves Bezemonde, herself loved by Selpion.

== Incipit ==
MANES DE RICHEMONT.

Je viens du clair sejour ou la tourbe des Anges
Benit son Createur d’un beau flus de louanges,
Je n’en faits que sortir en mon cœur soucieux
De voir encor un coup la surface des Cieux,
Ni de l’objet plus doux la grandeur infinie,

== Bibliography ==
- Boisard, Notices sur les Hommes du Calvados, Caen 1848.
- E. Frère, Manuel du bibliographe normand, Rouen, 1858.
- E. Gosselin, Le théâtre à Rouen avant Corneille, Rouen, 1869.

== See also ==
- French Renaissance literature
