= Communauté de communes du Pays de Falaise =

Federation of municipalities in Lower Normandy, France

Pays de Falaise
- Communauté de communes
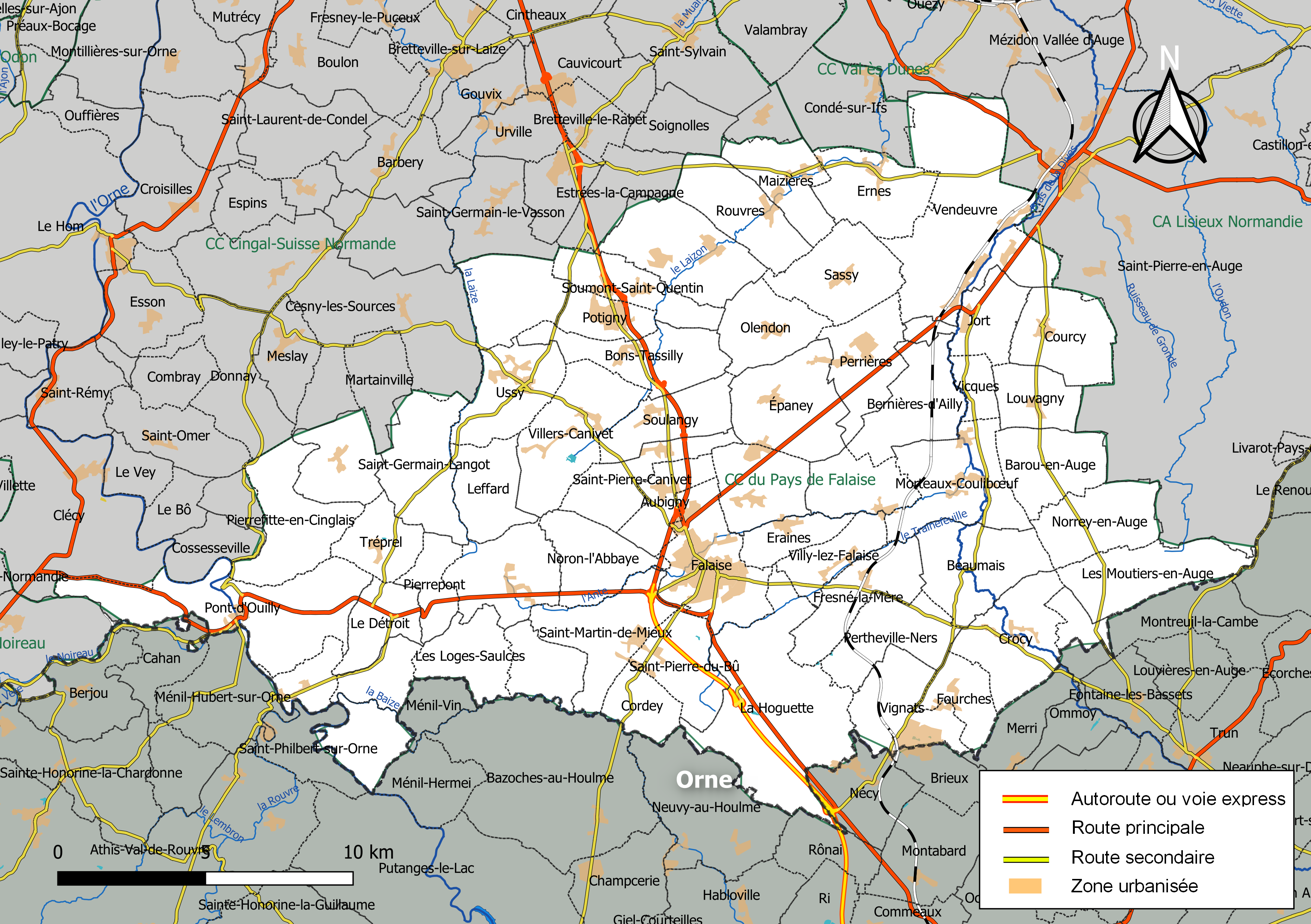
- Communauté de communes du Pays de Falaise area
- Country: France
- Region: Normandy
- Department: Calvados
- No. of communes: {{{nbcomm}}}
- Established: January 1993

Government
  - President: Jean-Philippe Mesnil
- Area: 488.4 km^{2} (188.6 sq mi)
- Population (2019): 27,724
  - Density: 56.76/km^{2} (147.0/sq mi)
- Website: www.paysdefalaise.fr

The Communauté de communes du Pays de Falaise is a federation of municipalities (communauté de communes) in the Calvados département and in the Normandy région of France. Its seat is Falaise. Its area is 488.4 km^{2}, and its population in 2019 was 27,724. It covers some of the Communes that make up the area known as Suisse Normande.

== Composition ==
The communauté de communes consists of the following 58 communes:

1. Aubigny
2. Barou-en-Auge
3. Beaumais
4. Bernières-d'Ailly
5. Bonnœil
6. Bons-Tassilly
7. Cordey
8. Courcy
9. Crocy
10. Damblainville
11. Épaney
12. Eraines
13. Ernes
14. Falaise
15. Fontaine-le-Pin
16. Fourches
17. Fourneaux-le-Val
18. Fresné-la-Mère
19. Jort
20. La Hoguette
21. Le Détroit
22. Le Marais-la-Chapelle
23. Le Mesnil-Villement
24. Leffard
25. Les Isles-Bardel
26. Les Loges-Saulces
27. Les Moutiers-en-Auge
28. Louvagny
29. Maizières
30. Martigny-sur-l'Ante
31. Morteaux-Coulibœuf
32. Noron-l'Abbaye
33. Norrey-en-Auge
34. Olendon
35. Ouilly-le-Tesson
36. Perrières
37. Pertheville-Ners
38. Pierrefitte-en-Cinglais
39. Pierrepont
40. Pont-d'Ouilly
41. Potigny
42. Rapilly
43. Rouvres
44. Saint-Germain-Langot
45. Saint-Martin-de-Mieux
46. Saint-Pierre-Canivet
47. Saint-Pierre-du-Bû
48. Sassy
49. Soulangy
50. Soumont-Saint-Quentin
51. Tréprel
52. Ussy
53. Vendeuvre
54. Versainville
55. Vicques
56. Vignats
57. Villers-Canivet
58. Villy-lez-Falaise
