= Baize (Orne, right bank) =

River in France

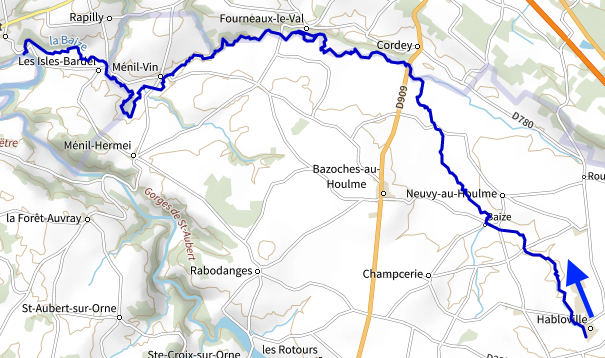
- The map of the course of the Baize

- Location within France Location within Normandy

Location
- Country: France

Physical characteristics
- Source
  - location: Habloville, Orne
- Mouth: Orne
  - coordinates: 48°50′57″N 0°21′49″W
- Length: 25.72 km (15.98 mi)

Basin features
- Progression: Orne→ English Channel

The Baize (French pronunciation: [bɛz]) is a river in northwestern France, crossing the departments of Orne and Calvados. It is 25.72 km long. Its source is in Habloville, and it flows into the river Orne at the border between the communes of Les Isles-Bardel and Rapilly, at the end of the Baize valley, through Suisse Normande.

== Tributaries ==
A list of the major tributaries of the Baize:

- Bilaine
- Bezeron
- Boulaire
- Ruisseau du Val Lienard
- Ruisseau du Val
- Ruisseau de la Fontaine Andre
- Ruisseau des Vallees
- Ruisseau des Vaux Viets

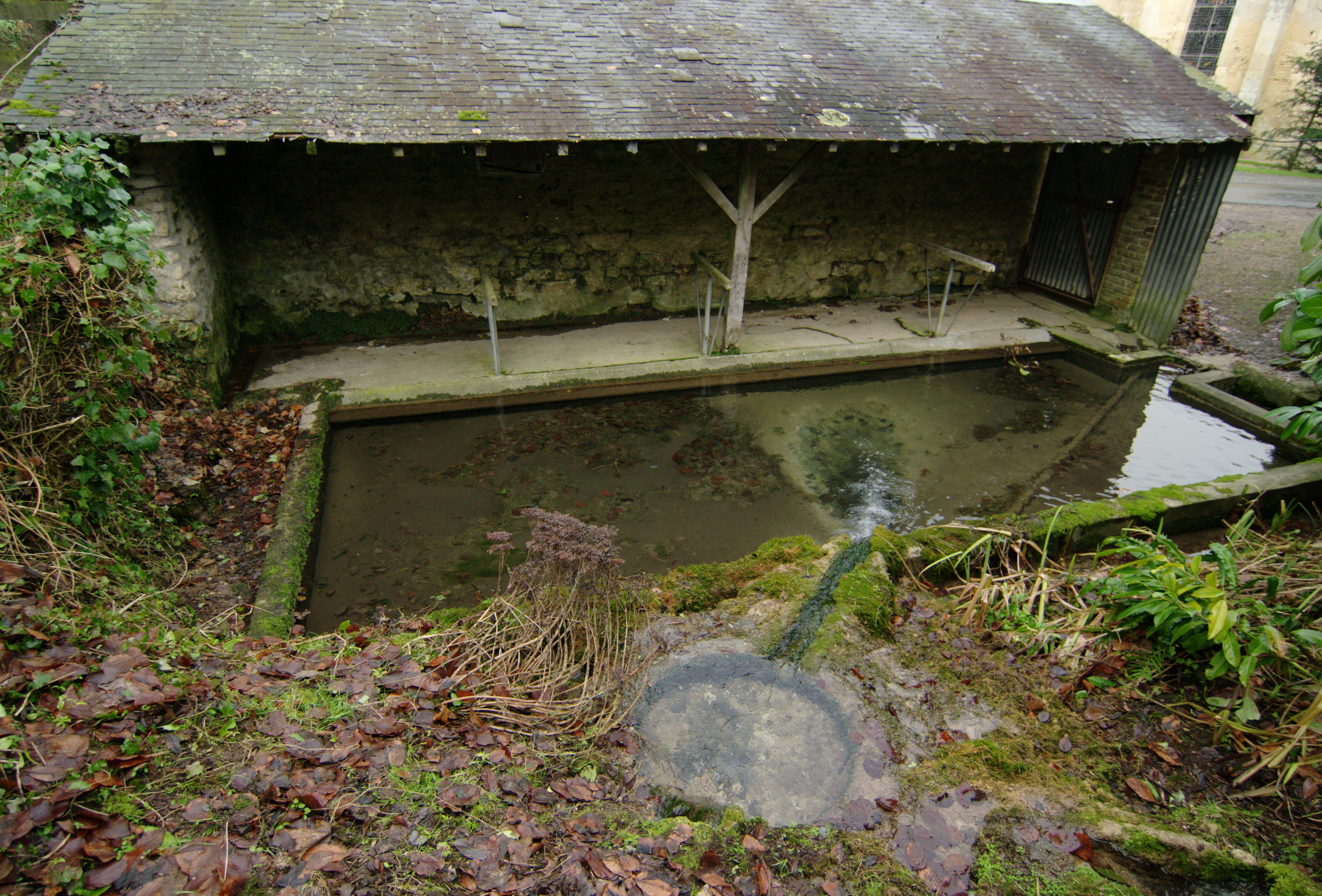
Source of the Baize in Habloville

== Fauna and Flaura ==
The rocky and stoney bed with good water quality makes the Baize a good habitat for spawning Atlantic salmon and Sea trout, as well as River Trout and white-clawed crayfish.
