= Damblainville =

- Commune
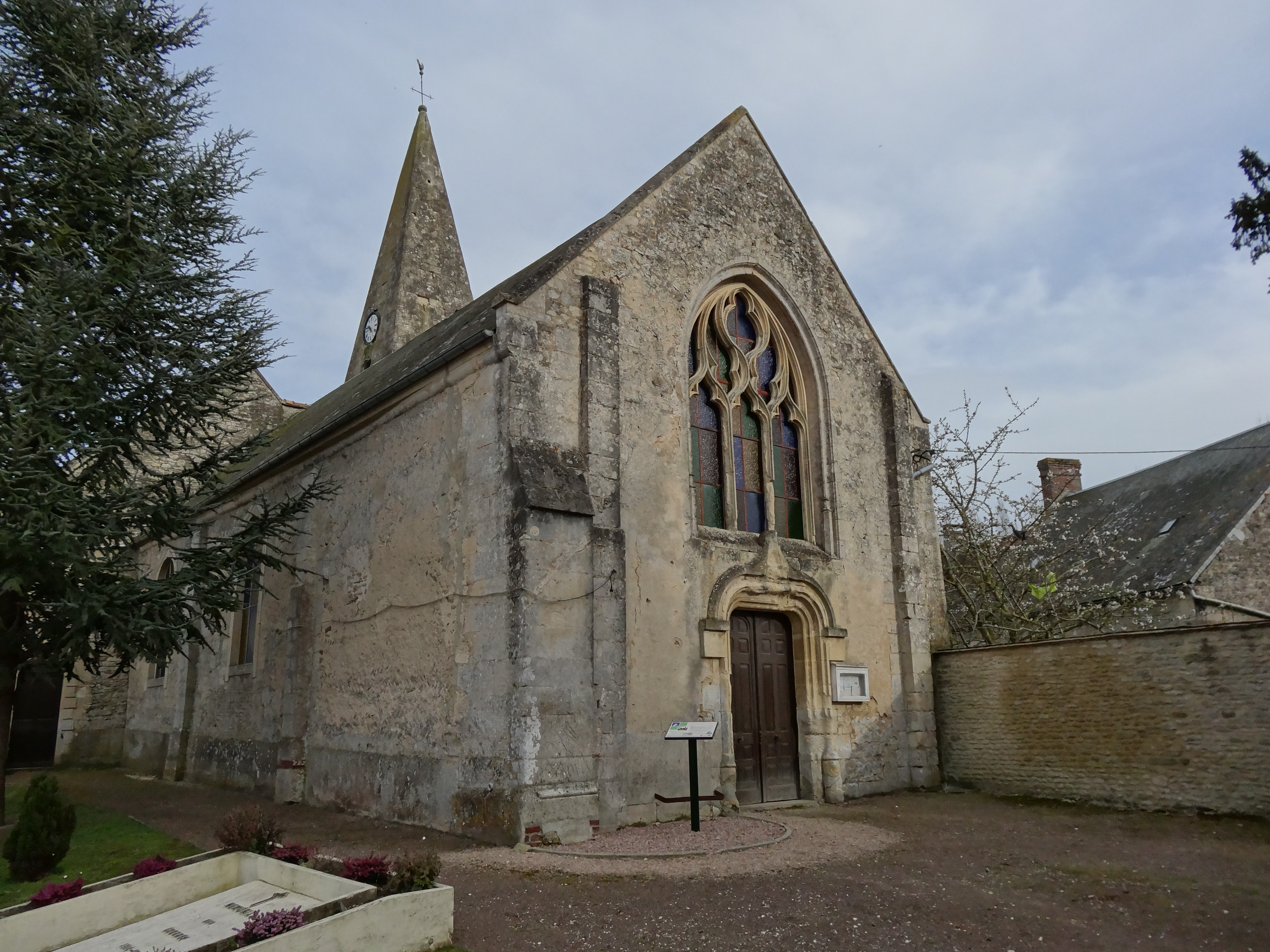
- The church in Damblainville
- Location of Damblainville
- Location within France Location within Normandy
- Coordinates: 48°54′59″N 0°06′41″W
- Country: France
- Region: Normandy
- Department: Calvados
- Arrondissement: Caen
- Canton: Falaise
- Intercommunality: Pays de Falaise

Government
  - Mayor (2020–2026): Michel Caillouet
- Area^{1}: 6.35 km^{2} (2.45 sq mi)
- Elevation: 80 m (260 ft)
- Highest elevation: 157 m (515 ft)
- Lowest elevation: 54 m (177 ft)
- Population (2023): 227
  - Density: 35.7/km^{2} (92.6/sq mi)
- Time zone: UTC+01:00 (CET)
  - Summer (DST): UTC+02:00 (CEST)
- INSEE/Postal code: 14216 /14620
- ^{1} French Land Register data, which excludes lakes, ponds, glaciers > 1 km^{2} (0.386 sq mi or 247 acres) and river estuaries.

Damblainville (French pronunciation: [dɑ̃blɛ̃vil]) is a commune in the Calvados department and Normandy region of north-western France.

Its inhabitants are known as Damblainvillais.

== Geography ==
The commune is made up of the following collection of villages and hamlets, La Croix d'Ailly and Damblainville.

The river Ante flows through the commune.

== Population ==
Historical population
Year	Pop.	±% p.a.
1968	171	—
1975	230	+4.33%
1982	220	−0.63%
1990	193	−1.62%
1999	189	−0.23%
2007	211	+1.39%
2012	225	+1.29%
2017	241	+1.38%
2023	227	−0.99%
Source: INSEE

== Transport ==
Aérodrome de Falaise-Mont d'Eraines is an Aerodrome within the commune that opened in 1947. Its ICAO airport code is LFAS. It has a 850 meter grass runway.

== Points of Interest ==
- Réserve naturelle du Coteau de Mesnil-Soleil is a 25 hectare National nature reserve of France which is shared with the neighbouring commune of Versainville.

== See also ==
- Communes of the Calvados department
