= Morteaux-Coulibœuf =

- Commune
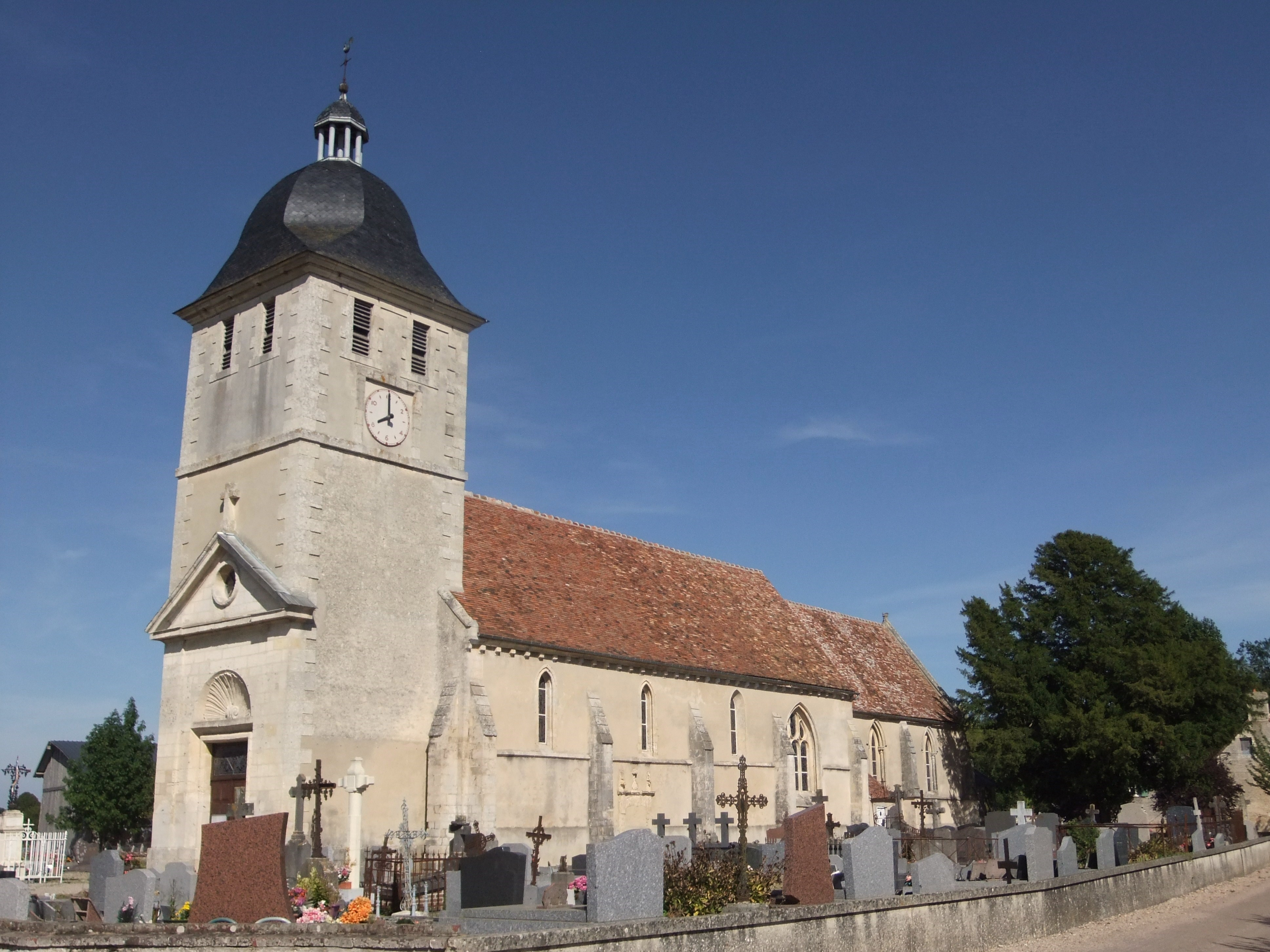
- The church in Morteaux

- Coat of arms
- Location of Morteaux-Coulibœuf
- Location within France Location within Normandy
- Coordinates: 48°55′30″N 0°04′27″W
- Country: France
- Region: Normandy
- Department: Calvados
- Arrondissement: Caen
- Canton: Falaise
- Intercommunality: Pays de Falaise

Government
  - Mayor (2020–2026): Christian Bacheley
- Area^{1}: 11.76 km^{2} (4.54 sq mi)
- Elevation: 64 m (210 ft)
- Highest elevation: 106 m (348 ft)
- Lowest elevation: 41 m (135 ft)
- Population (2023): 601
  - Density: 51.1/km^{2} (132/sq mi)
- Time zone: UTC+01:00 (CET)
  - Summer (DST): UTC+02:00 (CEST)
- INSEE/Postal code: 14452 /14620
- ^{1} French Land Register data, which excludes lakes, ponds, glaciers > 1 km^{2} (0.386 sq mi or 247 acres) and river estuaries.

Morteaux-Coulibœuf (French pronunciation: [mɔʁto kulibœf]) is a commune in the Calvados department in the Normandy region in northwestern France.

== Geography ==
The commune is made up of the following collection of villages and hamlets, Le Hôme, Le Grand Coulibœuf, La Gare de Coulibœuf, Blocqueville and Morteaux-Coulibœuf.

Three rivers the Dives (river), The Ante and Le Trainefeuille flow through the commune, plus a stream the Ruaux.

== Population ==
Historical population
Year	Pop.	±% p.a.
1968	620	—
1975	542	−1.90%
1982	505	−1.01%
1990	517	+0.29%
1999	514	−0.06%
2007	511	−0.07%
2012	572	+2.28%
2017	647	+2.49%
2023	601	−1.22%
Source: INSEE

== Points of Interest ==
=== National Heritage sites ===
- Eglise de Morteaux - A thirteenth century church, which listed as a Monument Historique in 1928.

== See also ==
- Communes of the Calvados department
