= Le Marais-la-Chapelle =

- Commune
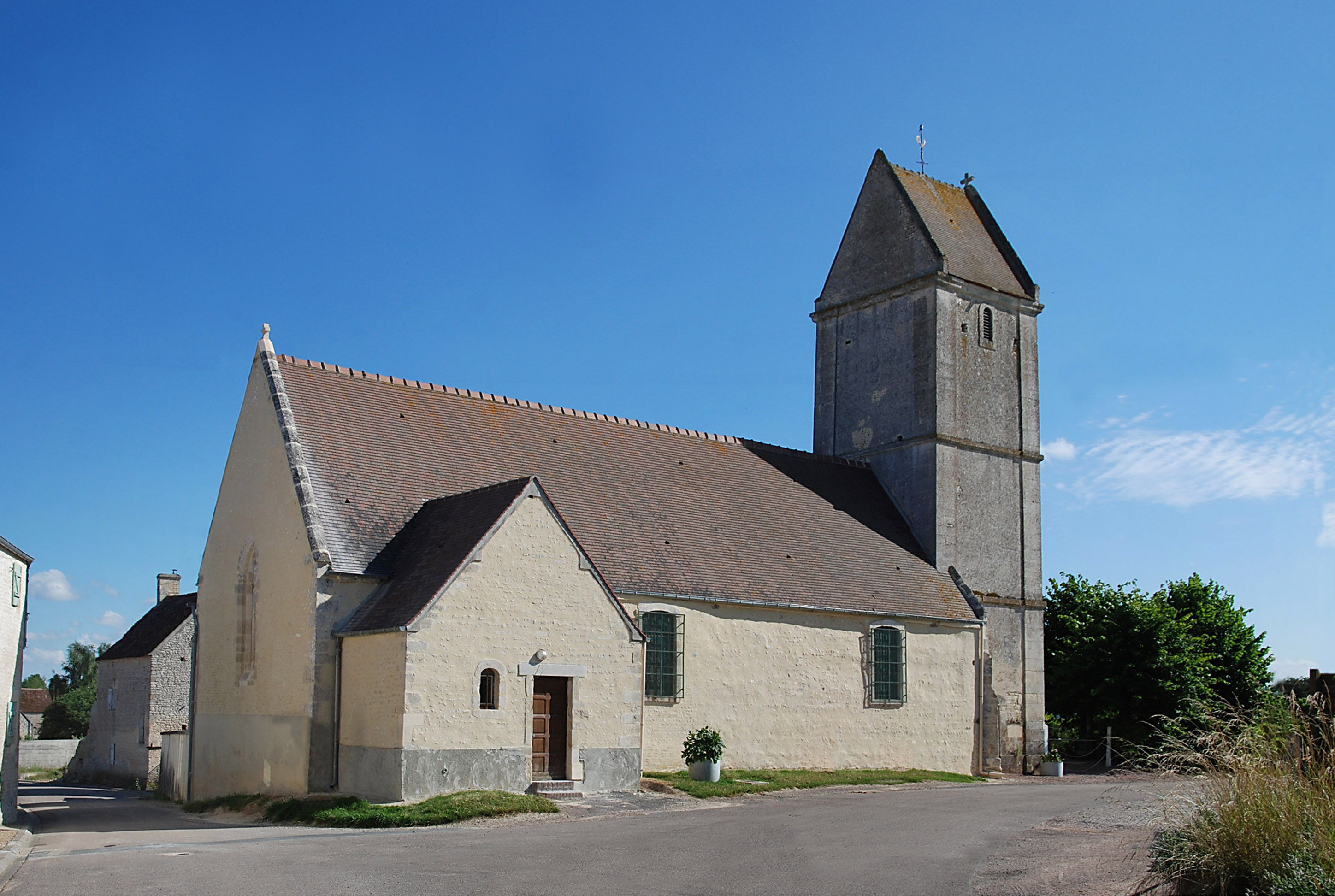
- The church in Le Marais-la-Chapelle
- Location of Le Marais-la-Chapelle
- Location within France Location within Normandy
- Coordinates: 48°52′57″N 0°01′27″W
- Country: France
- Region: Normandy
- Department: Calvados
- Arrondissement: Caen
- Canton: Falaise
- Intercommunality: Pays de Falaise

Government
  - Mayor (2020–2026): Michel Noël
- Area^{1}: 2.42 km^{2} (0.93 sq mi)
- Elevation: 70 m (230 ft)
- Highest elevation: 95 m (312 ft)
- Lowest elevation: 64 m (210 ft)
- Population (2023): 92
  - Density: 38/km^{2} (98/sq mi)
- Time zone: UTC+01:00 (CET)
  - Summer (DST): UTC+02:00 (CEST)
- INSEE/Postal code: 14402 /14620
- ^{1} French Land Register data, which excludes lakes, ponds, glaciers > 1 km^{2} (0.386 sq mi or 247 acres) and river estuaries.

Le Marais-la-Chapelle (French pronunciation: [lə maʁɛ la ʃapɛl]) is a commune in the Calvados department in the Normandy region in northwestern France.

== Population ==
Historical population
Year	Pop.	±% p.a.
1968	97	—
1975	61	−6.41%
1982	94	+6.37%
1990	77	−2.46%
1999	63	−2.21%
2007	78	+2.71%
2012	105	+6.13%
2017	108	+0.57%
2023	92	−2.64%
Source: INSEE

== See also ==
- Communes of the Calvados department
