= Louvagny =

- Commune
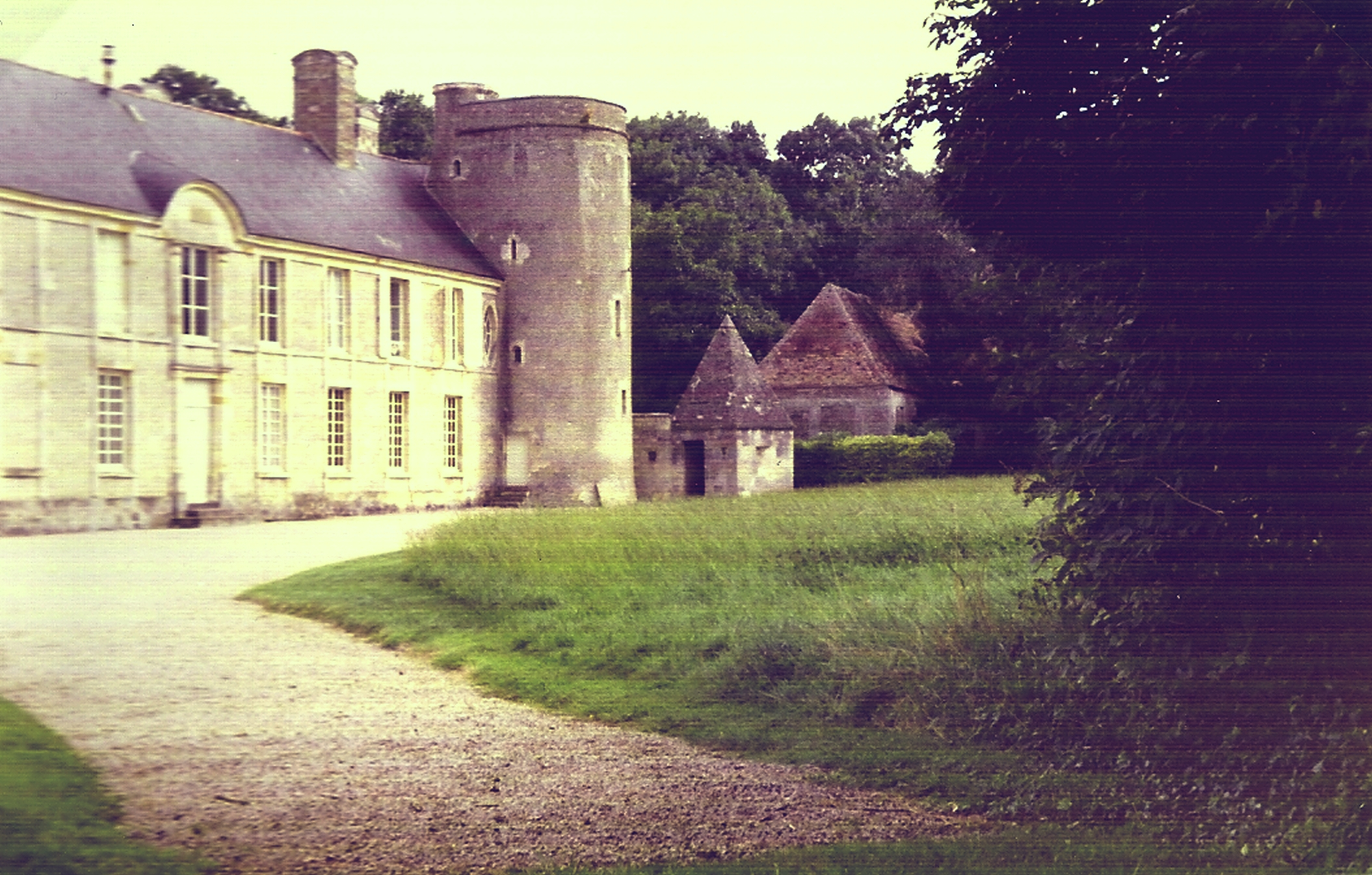
- Chateau

- Coat of arms
- Location of Louvagny
- Location within France Location within Normandy
- Coordinates: 48°56′50″N 0°02′38″W
- Country: France
- Region: Normandy
- Department: Calvados
- Arrondissement: Caen
- Canton: Falaise
- Intercommunality: Pays de Falaise

Government
  - Mayor (2020–2026): Christian Porchon
- Area^{1}: 5.50 km^{2} (2.12 sq mi)
- Elevation: 70 m (230 ft)
- Highest elevation: 88 m (289 ft)
- Lowest elevation: 48 m (157 ft)
- Population (2023): 58
  - Density: 11/km^{2} (27/sq mi)
- Time zone: UTC+01:00 (CET)
  - Summer (DST): UTC+02:00 (CEST)
- INSEE/Postal code: 14381 /14170
- ^{1} French Land Register data, which excludes lakes, ponds, glaciers > 1 km^{2} (0.386 sq mi or 247 acres) and river estuaries.

Louvagny (French pronunciation: [luvaɲi]) is a commune in the Calvados department in the Normandy region in northwestern France.

== Population ==
Historical population
| Year | Pop. | ±% p.a. |
|---|---|---|
| 1968 | 75 | — |
| 1975 | 73 | −0.39% |
| 1982 | 53 | −4.47% |
| 1990 | 62 | +1.98% |
| 1999 | 64 | +0.35% |
| 2007 | 70 | +1.13% |
| 2012 | 64 | −1.78% |
| 2017 | 60 | −1.28% |
| 2023 | 58 | −0.56% |
Source: INSEE

== Points of Interest ==
=== National heritage sites ===
The commune has two sites listed as a Monument historique.

- Château de Louvagny - a seventeenth century Chateau listed as a monument in 1977.
- église Saint Germain de Louvagny - a seventeenth century church listed as a monument in 1999.

== See also ==
- Communes of the Calvados department
