= Soulangy =

- Commune
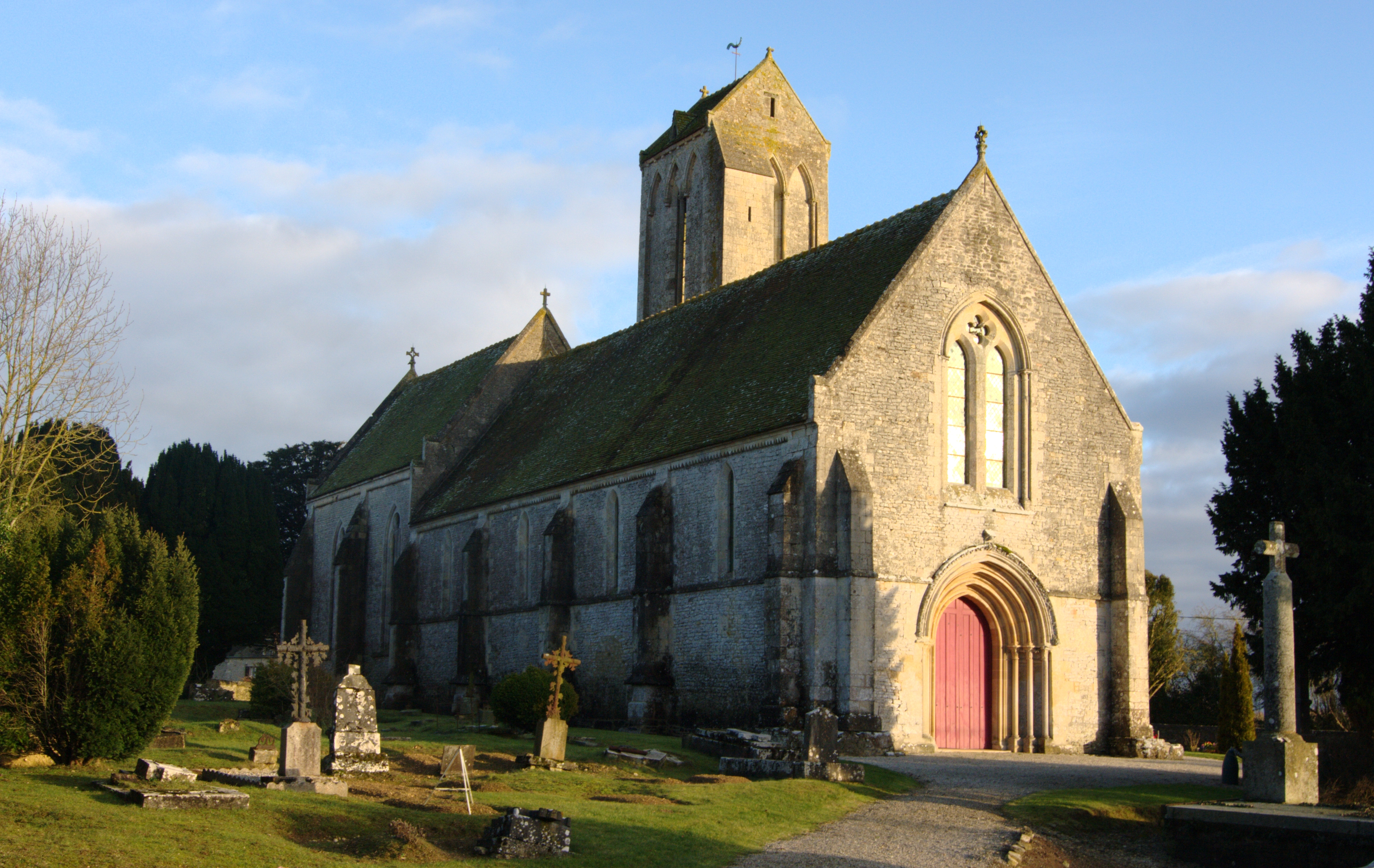
- The church in Soulangy
- Location of Soulangy
- Location within France Location within Normandy
- Coordinates: 48°56′36″N 0°13′08″W
- Country: France
- Region: Normandy
- Department: Calvados
- Arrondissement: Caen
- Canton: Falaise
- Intercommunality: Pays de Falaise

Government
  - Mayor (2023–2026): Philippe Poupard
- Area^{1}: 7.18 km^{2} (2.77 sq mi)
- Elevation: 148 m (486 ft)
- Highest elevation: 176 m (577 ft)
- Lowest elevation: 139 m (456 ft)
- Population (2023): 249
  - Density: 34.7/km^{2} (89.8/sq mi)
- Time zone: UTC+01:00 (CET)
  - Summer (DST): UTC+02:00 (CEST)
- INSEE/Postal code: 14677 /14700
- ^{1} French Land Register data, which excludes lakes, ponds, glaciers > 1 km^{2} (0.386 sq mi or 247 acres) and river estuaries.

Soulangy (French pronunciation: [sulɑ̃ʒi]) is a commune in the Calvados department in the Normandy region in northwestern France.

== Geography ==
The commune is made up of the following collection of villages and hamlets, Le Cognet, Les Caboches, Glatigny, Saint-Loup and Soulangy.

The river Laizon flows through the commune. in addition three streams also flow through the commune, the Cassis, the Moussaye and the Manque-Souris.

== Population ==
Historical population
Year	Pop.	±% p.a.
1968	159	—
1975	183	+2.03%
1982	230	+3.32%
1990	248	+0.95%
1999	238	−0.46%
2007	268	+1.50%
2012	256	−0.91%
2017	255	−0.08%
2023	249	−0.40%
Source: INSEE

== Points of Interest ==
- Menhir de Soulangy - a Neolithic Menhir that was discovered buried during archaeological excavations prior to the construction of the Soulangy bypass, which now sits not far from its discovery in the rest area on the Western side of the road.

=== National Heritage sites ===
The Commune has two buildings and areas listed as a Monument historique

- Manoir situé près de l'église seventeenth century Manor house that was listed as a monument in 1928.
- Église de la Nativité-de-Notre-Dame 13th century church listed as a monument in 1910.

== See also ==
- Communes of the Calvados department
