= Villers-Canivet =

- Commune
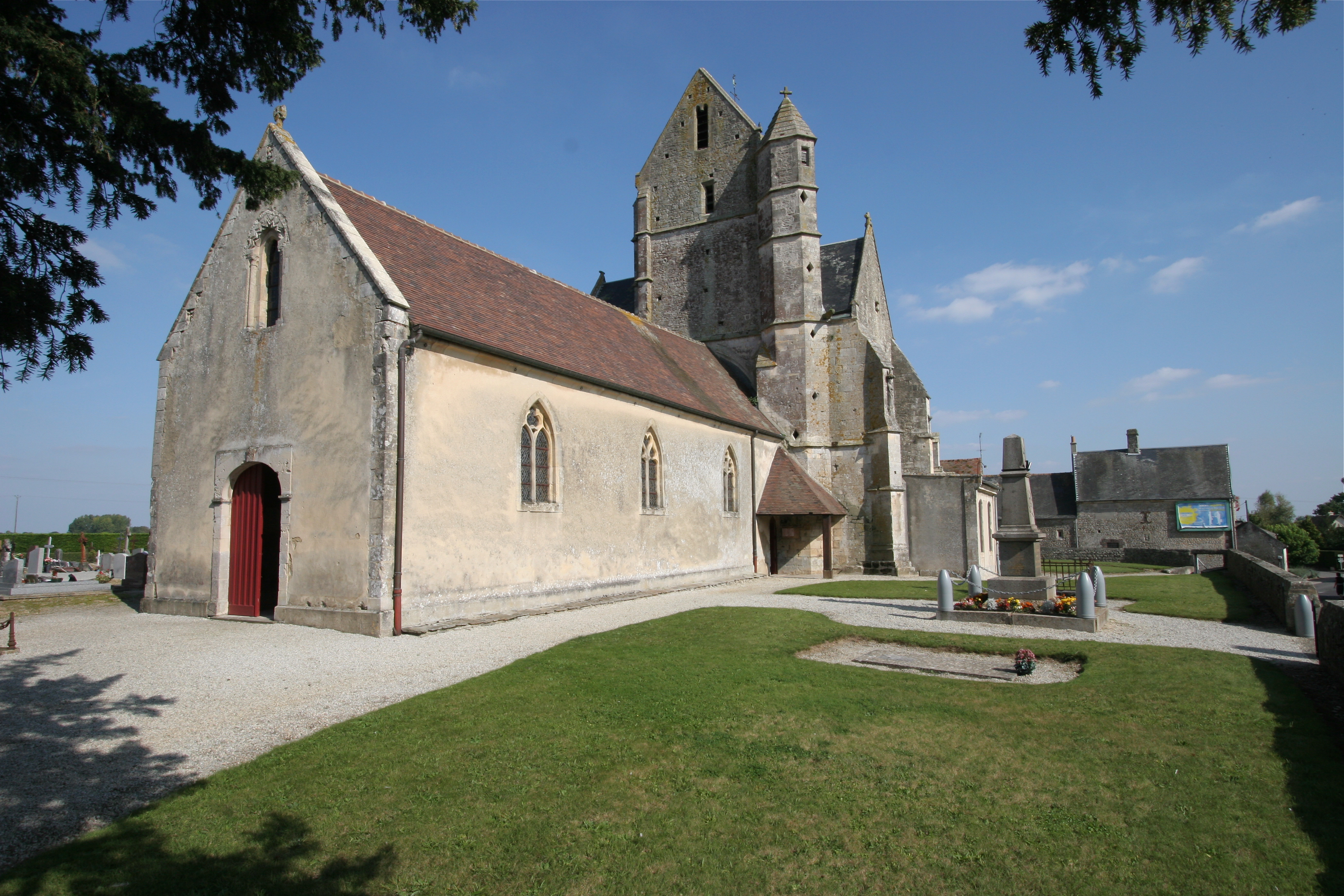
- The church in Villers-Canivet

- Coat of arms
- Location of Villers-Canivet
- Location within France Location within Normandy
- Coordinates: 48°56′28″N 0°15′15″W
- Country: France
- Region: Normandy
- Department: Calvados
- Arrondissement: Caen
- Canton: Falaise
- Intercommunality: Pays de Falaise

Government
  - Mayor (2020–2026): Jean-Louis Bonne
- Area^{1}: 12.24 km^{2} (4.73 sq mi)
- Elevation: 170 m (560 ft)
- Highest elevation: 233 m (764 ft)
- Lowest elevation: 139 m (456 ft)
- Population (2023): 720
  - Density: 59/km^{2} (150/sq mi)
- Time zone: UTC+01:00 (CET)
  - Summer (DST): UTC+02:00 (CEST)
- INSEE/Postal code: 14753 /14420
- ^{1} French Land Register data, which excludes lakes, ponds, glaciers > 1 km^{2} (0.386 sq mi or 247 acres) and river estuaries.

Villers-Canivet (French pronunciation: [vilɛʁ kanivɛ]) is a commune in the Calvados department in the Normandy region in northwestern France.

== Geography ==
The river Laizon flows through the commune. in addition three streams also flow through the commune, the Cassis, the Moussaye and the Manque-Souris.

== Population ==
Historical population
Year	Pop.	±% p.a.
1968	460	—
1975	459	−0.03%
1982	476	+0.52%
1990	502	+0.67%
1999	497	−0.11%
2007	692	+4.22%
2012	754	+1.73%
2017	771	+0.45%
2023	720	−1.13%
Source: INSEE

== Points of Interest ==
=== National Heritage sites ===
The commune has three sites listed as a Monument historique.

- The Old abbey - a former Cistercian abbey founded around 1127 by Roger de Montbray. The buildings date from around 14th century, it was listed as monument in 1974. The former abbey is open to the public from May to September.
- Torp Chapel - Twelfth century chapel listed as a monument in 2003.
- Église Saint Vigor - Twelfth century chapel listed as a monument in 1946.

== See also ==
- Communes of the Calvados department
