= Pascal Allizard =

French politician

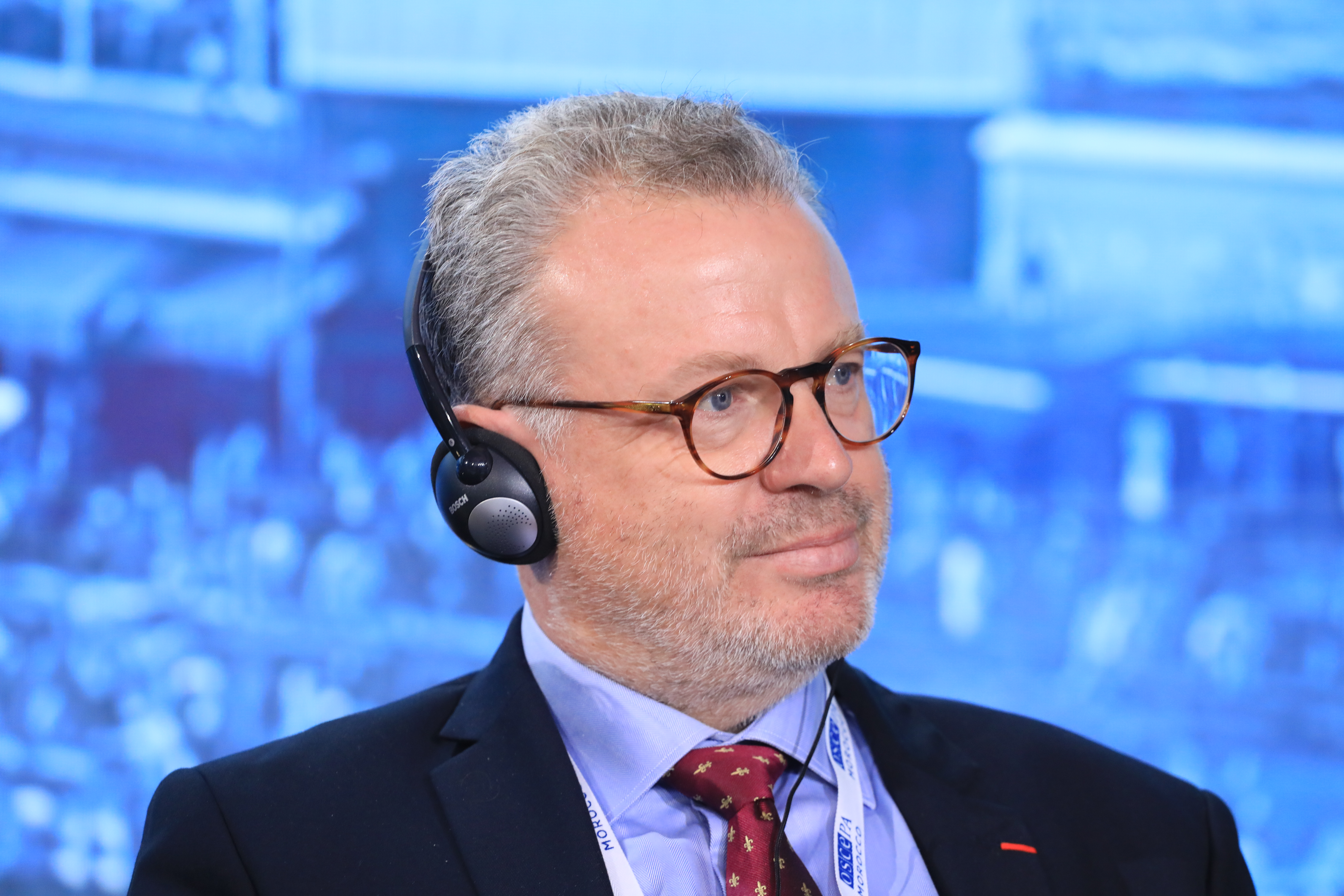

Member of the French Senate
- Incumbent
- Assumed office 1 October 2014
- Constituency: Calvados

Mayor of Condé-en-Normandie
- In office 2016–2017

Mayor of Condé-sur-Noireau
- In office 1995–2015

Personal details
- Born: 19 December 1962 (age 63) Paris, France
- Party: The Republicans
- Education: University of Caen Normandy

Pascal Allizard (born 19 December 1962) is a French politician of the Republicans (LR) who has been serving as a member of the Senate of France since 2014, representing the Calvados department.

== Political career ==
An industrial business manager by profession, Allizard has been the mayor of Condé-en-Normandie since 2016. He was mayor of Condé-sur-Noireau from 1995 until the commune merged with La Chapelle-Engerbold, Lénault, Proussy, Saint-Germain-du-Crioult and Saint-Pierre-la-Vieille to become Condé-en-Normandie.

In the Senate, Allizard serves on the Committee on Foreign Affairs and Defense and the Committee on European Affairs.

In addition to his committee assignments, Allizard has been part of the French delegation to the Parliamentary Assembly of the Organization for Security and Co-operation in Europe (OSCE) since 2014.

In the Republicans' 2017 leadership election, Allizard endorsed Laurent Wauquiez as chairman.
