= Le Doulcet =

Le Doulcet is the name of several persons of the same family:

- Louis Gustave le Doulcet, comte de Pontécoulant, French politician
- Cécile le Doulcet de Pontécoulant, (1767–1827), sister of Louis Gustave le Doulcet, and first wife of Emmanuel de Grouchy
- Louis Adolphe le Doulcet, comte de Pontécoulant, French soldier and musicologist, one of his sons
- Philippe Gustave le Doulcet, Comte de Pontécoulant, French astronomer, and another one of his sons
