= Michèle Fabien =

Belgian writer and playwright

- Born: Michèle Gabrielle Alice Gérard; 2 April 1945; Genk
- Died: 10 September 1999 (aged 54); Caen
- Resting place: Saint-Pierre-la-Vieille
- Education: University of Liège
- Known for: writer and playwright
- Children: Alice Piemme
- Parent: Albert S. Gérard

Michèle Gérard (she wrote under the name Michèle Fabien) (April 2, 1945 – September 10, 1999) was a Belgian writer and playwright.

The daughter of Albert S. Gérard, a professor of literature, she was born in Genk. She received a PhD from the University of Liège. With Marc Liebens, she helped create the Ensemble Théâtral Mobile, a Belgian theatre company, and was one its resident writers from 1974.

Fabien suffered a cerebral hemorrhage and died a few days later at the age of 54 in Caen, Normandy. She was buried at Saint-Pierre-la-Vieille cemetery.

== Original works ==
- Jocaste (1981)
- Sara Z (1982)
- Notre Sade (1985)
- Tausk (1987)
- Adget et Bérénice (1989)
- Claire Lacombe (1989)
- Berty.Albrecht (1989)
- Déjanire (1995)
- Charlotte (1999)

== Translated and/or adapted works ==
- Maison de poupée (Henrik Ibsen) (1975)
- Les Bons Offices (Pierre Mertens) (1980)
- Oui (Thomas Bernhard) (1981)
- Aurelia Steiner (Marguerite Duras) (1982)
- Affabulazione (Pier Paolo Pasolini) (1988)
- Pylade (Pier Paolo Pasolini) (1990)
- Calderon (Pier Paolo Pasolini) (1990)
- Amphitryon (Plautus) (1992)
- Cassandre (Christa Wolf) (1995)
- Une paix royale (Pierre Mertens) (1997)
- Stabat mater (Antonio Tarantino) (1998)
- Œdipe sur la route (Henry Bauchau) (1999)
