= Pontécoulant =

- Commune
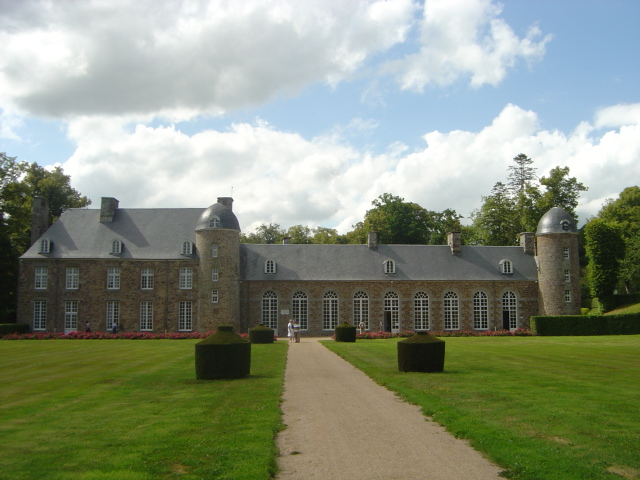
- Chateau
- Location of Pontécoulant
- Location within France Location within Normandy
- Coordinates: 48°52′45″N 0°35′12″W
- Country: France
- Region: Normandy
- Department: Calvados
- Arrondissement: Vire
- Canton: Condé-en-Normandie
- Intercommunality: Intercom de la Vire au Noireau

Government
  - Mayor (2023–2026): Gislaine Marie
- Area^{1}: 2.38 km^{2} (0.92 sq mi)
- Elevation: 64 m (210 ft)
- Highest elevation: 245 m (804 ft)
- Lowest elevation: 98 m (322 ft)
- Population (2023): 71
  - Density: 30/km^{2} (77/sq mi)
- Time zone: UTC+01:00 (CET)
  - Summer (DST): UTC+02:00 (CEST)
- INSEE/Postal code: 14512 /14110
- ^{1} French Land Register data, which excludes lakes, ponds, glaciers > 1 km^{2} (0.386 sq mi or 247 acres) and river estuaries.

Pontécoulant (French pronunciation: [pɔ̃tekulɑ̃]) is a commune in the Calvados department in the Normandy region in northwestern France.

== Geography ==
The commune is part of the area known as Suisse Normande.

The commune is made up of the following collection of villages and hamlets, Launay and Pontécoulant.

The Commune along with another nine communes shares part of a 5,729 hectare, Natura 2000 conservation area, called the Bassin de la Druance.

The communes single watercourse is the River, La Druance.

The commune is completely enclosed within the commune of Condé-en-Normandie.

== Population ==
Historical population
Year	Pop.	±% p.a.
1968	125	—
1975	109	−1.94%
1982	106	−0.40%
1990	105	−0.12%
1999	108	+0.31%
2007	94	−1.72%
2012	91	−0.65%
2017	80	−2.54%
2023	71	−1.97%
Source: INSEE

== Points of Interest ==
=== National heritage sites ===
- Château à Pontécoulant is a seventeenth century Chateau that is a Museum of France, after its owners in 1908 left it to the department. The chateau was listed as a Monument historique in 1927.

== Notable people ==
- Louis Gustave le Doulcet, comte de Pontécoulant (1764 – 1853) a French politician, was count of Pontécoulant.
- Philippe Gustave le Doulcet, Comte de Pontécoulant - (1795–1874) a French astronomer, count of Pontécoulant and died here.
- Louis Adolphe le Doulcet, comte de Pontécoulant (1794 – 1882) a French soldier and musicologist was count of Pontécoulant.

== See also ==
- Communes of the Calvados department
