= Druance =

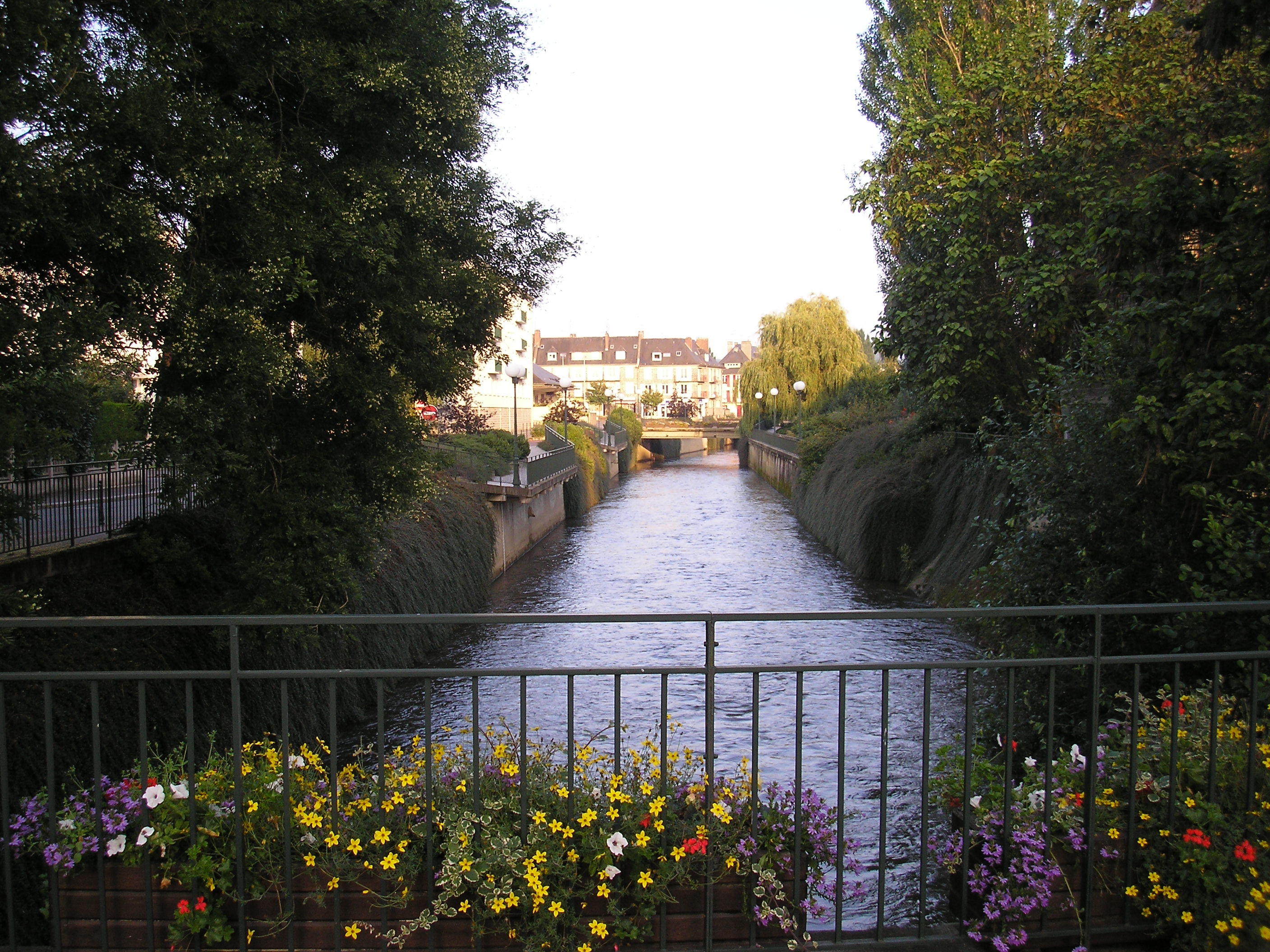
- The Druance flowing through Condé-sur-Noireau

- Location within France Location within Normandy

Location
- Country: France

Physical characteristics
- Source
  - location: Les Monts d'Aunay, Calvados
- Mouth: Noireau
  - coordinates: 48°50′54.6″N 0°32′49.6″W
- Length: 31.24 km (19.41 mi)

Basin features
- Progression: Noireau→ Orne→ English Channel

The Druance (French pronunciation: [dʁyɑ̃s]) is a river in northwestern France, flowing through the department of Calvados. It is 31.24 km long. Its source is in Les Monts d'Aunay, and it flows into the river Noireau in the commune of Condé-sur-Noireau and through Suisse Normande. It flows through three other communes, Terres de Druance, Périgny & Pontécoulant all of which are in the area known as Suisse Normande.

The surrounding area of the river and its tributaries are a Natura 2000 conservation area, called Bassin de la Druance.
