= La Villette, Calvados =

La Villette
- Commune
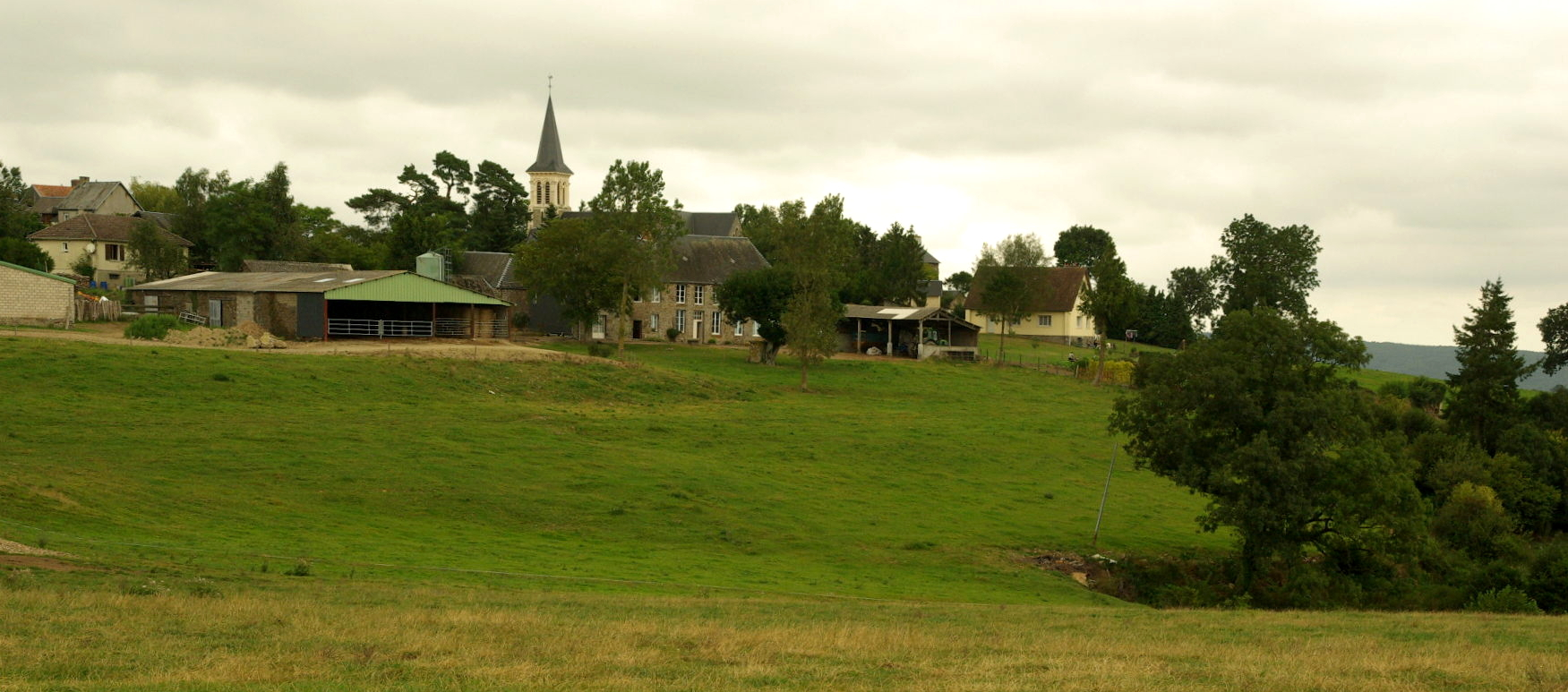
- A general view of La Villette
- Location of La Villette
- Location within France Location within Normandy
- Coordinates: 48°54′46″N 0°32′32″W
- Country: France
- Region: Normandy
- Department: Calvados
- Arrondissement: Vire
- Canton: Condé-en-Normandie
- Intercommunality: Intercom de la Vire au Noireau

Government
  - Mayor (2020–2026): Daniel Bréard
- Area^{1}: 9.74 km^{2} (3.76 sq mi)
- Elevation: 260 m (850 ft)
- Highest elevation: 262 m (860 ft)
- Lowest elevation: 90 m (300 ft)
- Population (2023): 217
  - Density: 22.3/km^{2} (57.7/sq mi)
- Time zone: UTC+01:00 (CET)
  - Summer (DST): UTC+02:00 (CEST)
- INSEE/Postal code: 14756 /14570
- ^{1} French Land Register data, which excludes lakes, ponds, glaciers > 1 km^{2} (0.386 sq mi or 247 acres) and river estuaries.

La Villette (French pronunciation: [la vilɛt]) is a commune in the Calvados department in the Normandy region in northwestern France.

== Geography ==
The commune is part of the area known as Suisse Normande.

The commune is made up of the following collection of villages and hamlets, La Fresnée, Claude Fougère, La Villette, Les Forges, Les Poiriers and La Porte.

The Commune along with another nine communes shares part of a 5,729 hectare, Natura 2000 conservation area, called the Bassin de la Druance.

Two streams flow through the communes borders La Porte and The Val Fournet.

== Population ==
Historical population
Year	Pop.	±% p.a.
1968	165	—
1975	152	−1.17%
1982	154	+0.19%
1990	153	−0.08%
1999	153	+0.00%
2007	173	+1.55%
2012	217	+4.64%
2017	226	+0.82%
2023	217	−0.68%
Source: INSEE

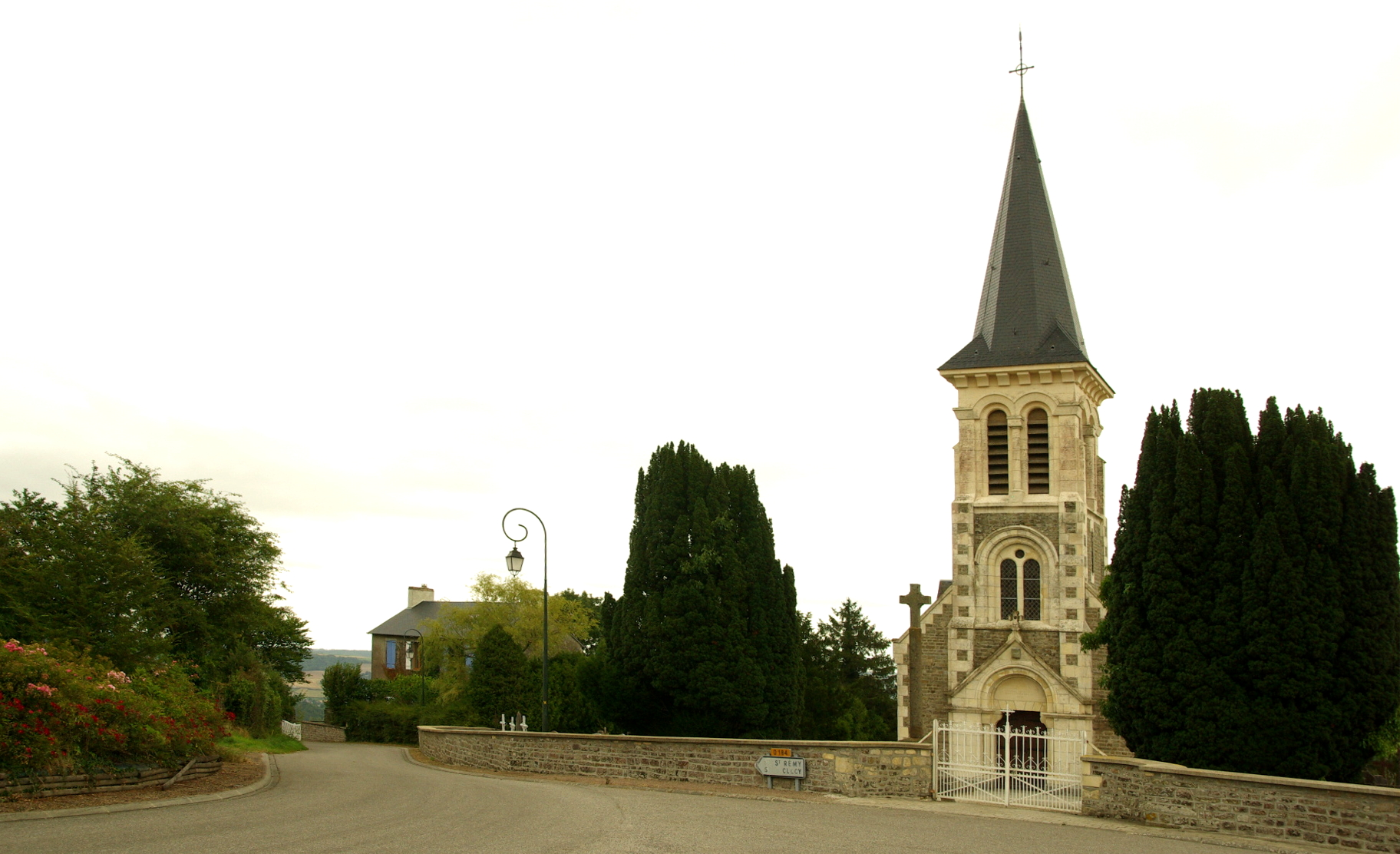
La Villette Church

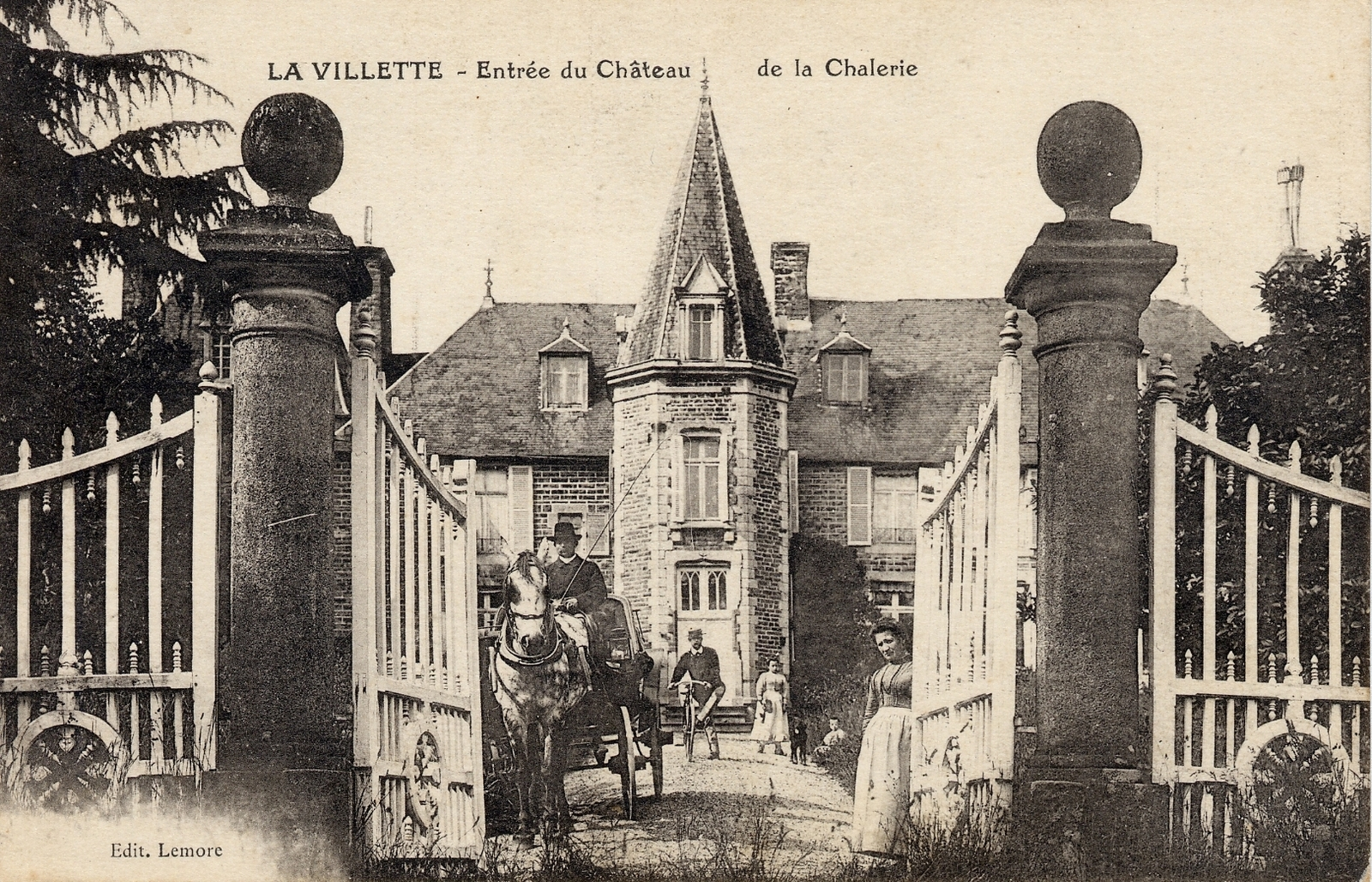
Old Postcard showing Chateau de La Chalerie in La Villette

== See also ==
- Communes of the Calvados department
