= Louis Adolphe le Doulcet, comte de Pontécoulant =

French soldier and musicologist

Louis Adolphe le Doulcet de Pontécoulant
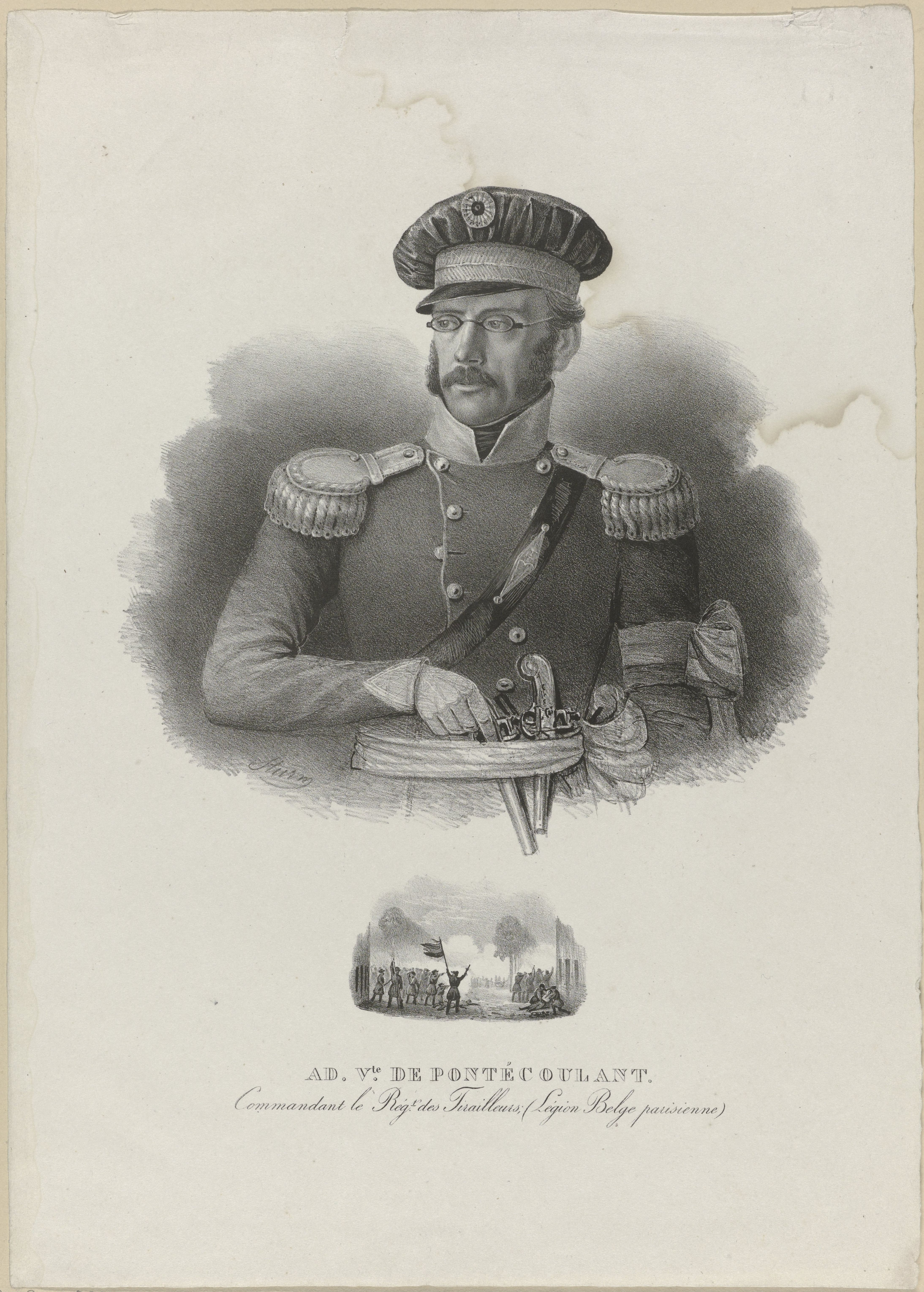
- Born: 10 May 1794; Paris, France
- Died: 20 February 1882 (aged 87)
- Parent: Louis Gustave le Doulcet, comte de Pontécoulant

Louis Adolphe le Doulcet, comte de Pontécoulant (1794 – 20 February 1882) was a French soldier and musicologist. He was the son of Louis Gustave le Doulcet, comte de Pontécoulant and the older brother of Philippe Gustave le Doulcet.

A soldier in the armies of Napoleon I, he fought in the invasion of Russia and the campaign of 1814, and then emigrated to [Brazil, where he took part in the abortive Pernambucan Revolution in 1817.

He also organized a French volunteer contingent in the Belgian Revolution of 1830, and was wounded at Louvain. The rest of his life was spent in Paris in the study of ancient music and acoustics. Among his works was one on the Musée instrumental du Conservatoire (1864).

== Distinctions ==
- Ordre des Palmes académiques in 1865.

== Publications ==
- Histoire des révolutions des villes de Nismes et d'Uzès, suivie de toutes les pièces justificatives; dédiée à Messieurs les députés, Pris, 1820 (Read online)
- Réflexions sur la pétition de M. Madier de Montjau, conseiller à la Cour royale de Nismes, adressée à la Chambre des Députés, Nismes, 1820 (Read online)
- Pétition à messieurs les Sénateurs et Représentants de la Belgique par le colonel de Pontécoulant, Bruxelles, 1835.
- L'Espagne en 1837, Paris, 1838 (Read online).
- Organograhie, ou Analyse des travaux de la facture instrumentale admise à l'Exposition des produits de l'industrie, Paris, 1839.
- Histoire des instruments de musique d'après les anciens écrivains et les monuments de l'antiquité, Paris, 1841.
- Mme Dorus-Gras, Paris, 1844.
- La musique chez le peuple ou L'Opéra-national : son passé et son avenir sur le boulevard du Temple, Paris, 1847 (Read online)
- Légion franco-italienne. Appel en faveur de l’émancipation de l’Italie, signé par les commandants supérieurs Bonnefond et Pontécoulant, Paris, 1848
- Organographie. Essai sur la facture instrumentale. Art, industrie et commerce, Paris, 1861 (Read online).
- Douze jours à Londres, voyage d'un mélomane à travers l'Exposition universelle, Paris, 1862 (Read online).
- Musée instrumental du Conservatoire de musique. Histoires et anecdotes, Paris, 1864
- Exposition universelle de Londres de 1862. Rapport adressé à M. le préfet de Seine-et-Marne, Paris, 1864.
- Les Symphonistes de la cathédrale de Meaux, Paris, 1864.
- Musée instrumental du Conservatoire de musique. Histoires et anecdotes, Paris, 1864.
- Notice sur quelques antiquités situées dans le canton de Nangis (Seine-et-Marne), Paris, 1865.
- Les Phénomènes de la musique ou Influence du son sur les êtres animés, Paris, 1868.
- La Musique à l'Exposition universelle de 1867, Paris, 1868 (Read online).
- Music at the Universal Exhibition, in Watson's Art Journal, 13 July 1867, p. 185-186 (Read online)
- The fact about the American piano in Paris. Chickering triumphant, in Watson's Art Journal, 17 August 1867, p. 266 (Read online)
- Brevet d'invention. Harmonium Debain, Paris, s.d.
