= Périgny, Calvados =

Périgny
- Commune
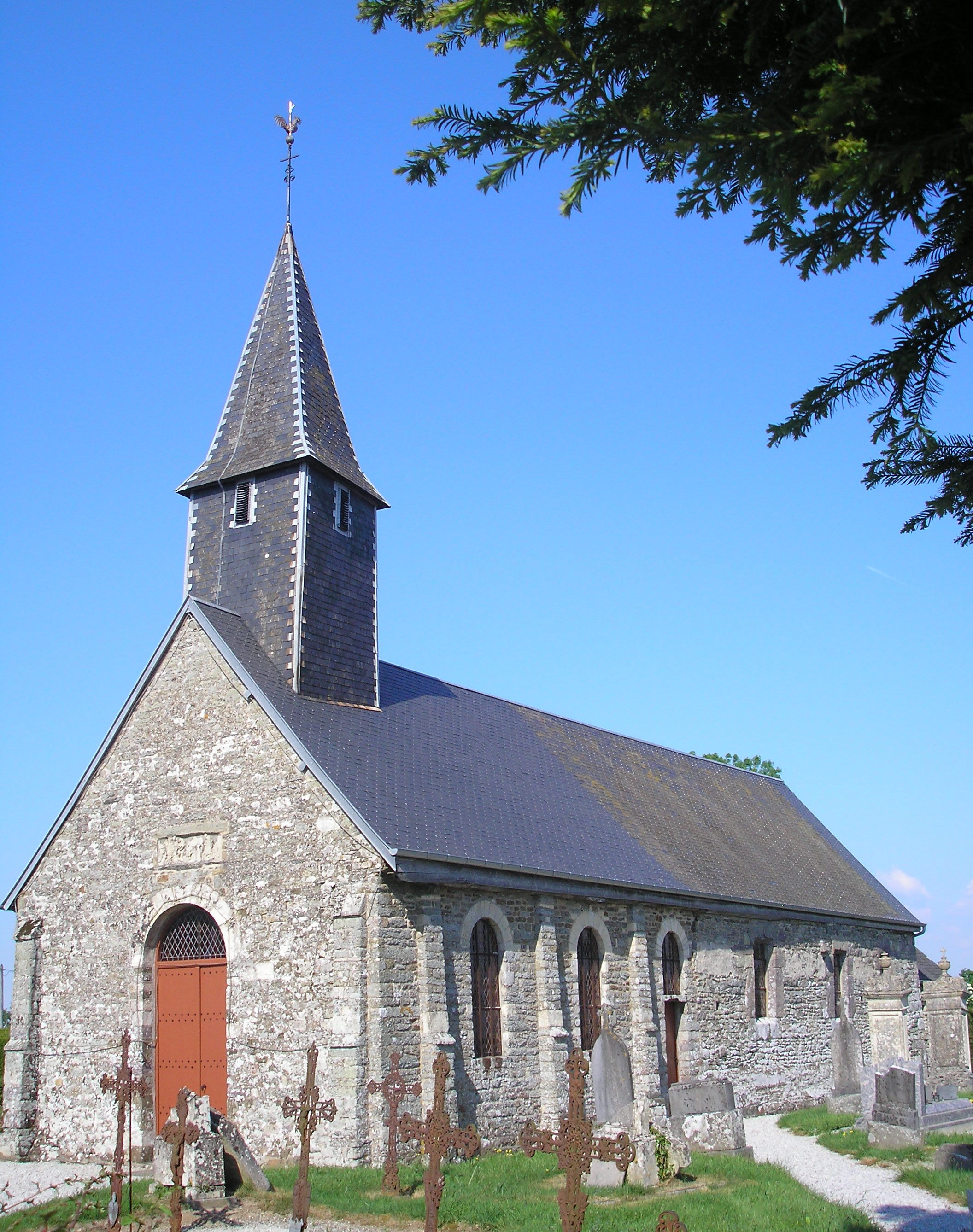
- The church in Périgny
- Location of Périgny
- Location within France Location within Normandy
- Coordinates: 48°55′22″N 0°36′14″W
- Country: France
- Region: Normandy
- Department: Calvados
- Arrondissement: Vire
- Canton: Condé-en-Normandie
- Intercommunality: Intercom de la Vire au Noireau

Government
  - Mayor (2020–2026): Jean-Christophe Meunier
- Area^{1}: 2.66 km^{2} (1.03 sq mi)
- Elevation: 214 m (702 ft)
- Highest elevation: 232 m (761 ft)
- Lowest elevation: 120 m (390 ft)
- Population (2023): 58
  - Density: 22/km^{2} (56/sq mi)
- Time zone: UTC+01:00 (CET)
  - Summer (DST): UTC+02:00 (CEST)
- INSEE/Postal code: 14496 /14770
- ^{1} French Land Register data, which excludes lakes, ponds, glaciers > 1 km^{2} (0.386 sq mi or 247 acres) and river estuaries.

Périgny (French pronunciation: [peʁiɲi]) is a commune in the Calvados department in the Normandy region in northwestern France.

== Geography ==
The commune is part of the area known as Suisse Normande.

The commune is made up of the following collection of villages and hamlets, Danne, Périgny and Le Bout de Là.

The Commune along with another nine communes shares part of a 5,729 hectare, Natura 2000 conservation area, called the Bassin de la Druance.

The river La Druance plus The Cresme stream are the only watercourses flowing through the commune.

== Population ==
Historical population
Year	Pop.	±% p.a.
1968	77	—
1975	60	−3.50%
1982	47	−3.43%
1990	53	+1.51%
1999	62	+1.76%
2007	54	−1.71%
2012	56	+0.73%
2017	58	+0.70%
2023	58	+0.00%
Source: INSEE

== See also ==
- Communes of the Calvados department
