= Bassin de la Druance =

Bassin de la Druance translated as the Druance Basin is a Natura 2000 conservation area that is 5,729 hectares in size.

== Geography ==
The area is a mixture of shales, Brioverian sandstones then Ordovician sandstones, with which the wet meadows at the bottom of the valley, the wooded hillsides and woods at the summit all sit upon.

It is spread across 10 different communes all within the Orne department;

1. Condé-en-Normandie
2. Cauville
3. Dialan sur Chaîne
4. Les Monts d'Aunay
5. Pontécoulant
6. Périgny
7. Souleuvre en Bocage
8. Terres de Druance
9. Valdallière
10. La Villette

Some of this protected site is within the area known as Suisse Normande

== Conservation ==
The conservation area has five species listed in Annex 2 of the Habitats Directive;

1. European bullhead
2. Bullhead
3. Brook lamprey
4. white-clawed crayfish
5. Atlantic salmon
