= Condé-en-Normandie =

- Commune
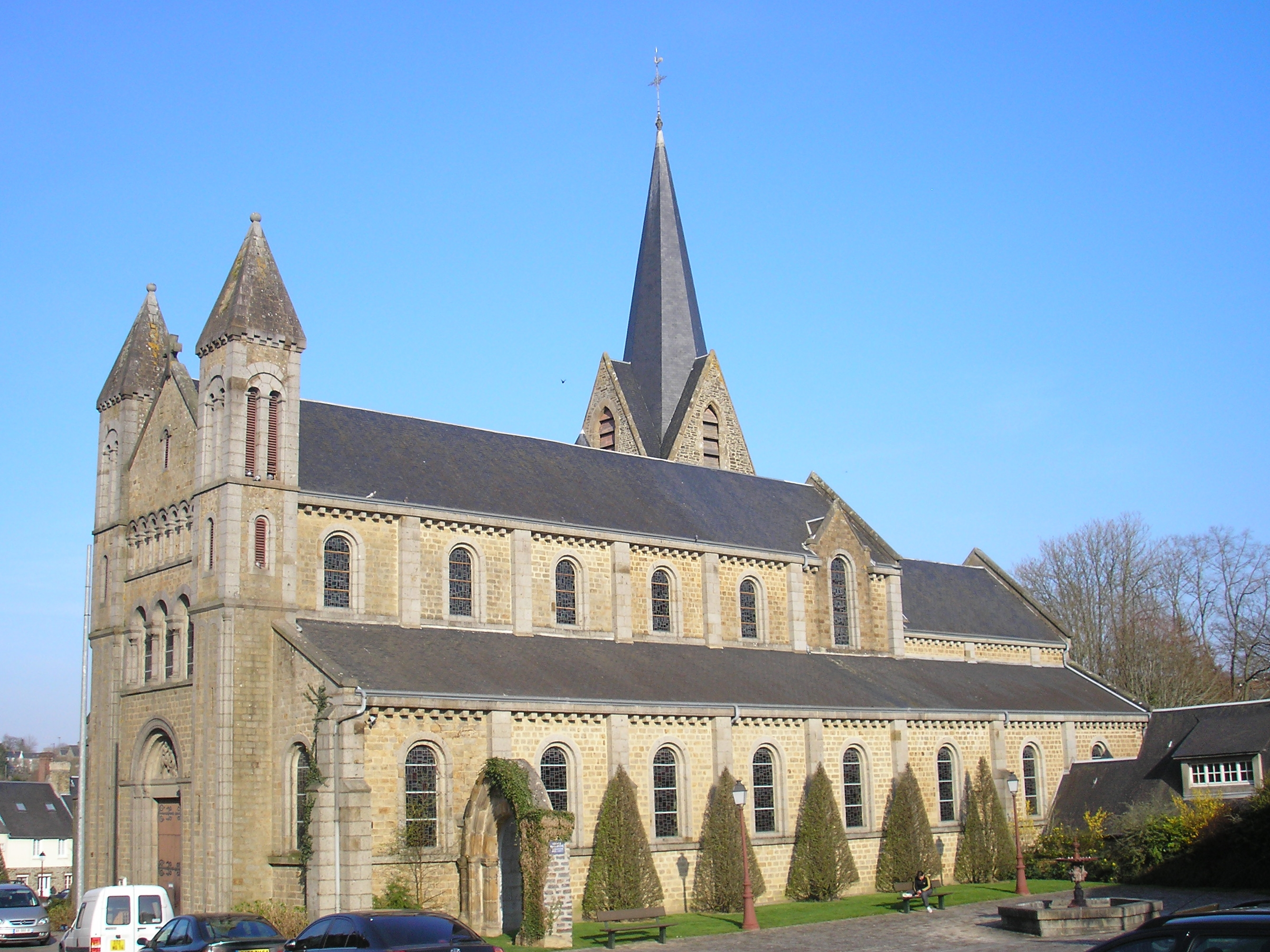
- St. Martin's Church in Condé-sur-Noireau
- Location of Condé-en-Normandie
- Location within France Location within Normandy
- Coordinates: 48°51′04″N 0°33′11″W
- Country: France
- Region: Normandy
- Department: Calvados
- Arrondissement: Vire
- Canton: Condé-en-Normandie
- Intercommunality: Intercom de la Vire au Noireau

Government
  - Mayor (2020–2026): Valérie Desquesne
- Area^{1}: 62.98 km^{2} (24.32 sq mi)
- Population (2023): 5,985
  - Density: 95.03/km^{2} (246.1/sq mi)
- Time zone: UTC+01:00 (CET)
  - Summer (DST): UTC+02:00 (CEST)
- INSEE/Postal code: 14174 /14110, 14770
- ^{1} French Land Register data, which excludes lakes, ponds, glaciers > 1 km^{2} (0.386 sq mi or 247 acres) and river estuaries.

Condé-en-Normandie (French pronunciation: [kɔ̃de ɑ̃ nɔʁmɑ̃di]) is a commune in the department of Calvados, northwestern France. The municipality was established on 1 January 2016 by merger of the former communes of Condé-sur-Noireau (the seat), La Chapelle-Engerbold, Lénault, Proussy, Saint-Germain-du-Crioult and Saint-Pierre-la-Vieille.

== Geography ==
The commune is part of the area known as Suisse Normande.

The commune is made up of the following collection of villages and hamlets, Le Mesnil, Lénault, Le Tremblay, Cresme, Rousseville, Saint-Pierre-la-Vieille, Le Hamel Roger, Le Vieux Douet, La Chapelle-Engerbold, Le Hamel, Le Mont Hue, Proussy, Les Haies, Le Coudray, Le Hamel, Les Îles, Bouilly, Solier, Vaux, Condé-sur-Noireau, Le Bosq and L'Abbaye.

The Commune along with another nine communes shares part of a 5,729 hectare, Natura 2000 conservation area, called the Bassin de la Druance.

The Tortillon, la Druance plus The Noireau are the three rivers flowing through the commune. In addition the commune has five streams flowing through its borders, La Blare, The Cresme, The Vaux, The Hamelet and The Val Fournet.

== Population ==
Population data refer to the commune in its geography as of January 2025.

Historical population
Year	Pop.	±% p.a.
1968	8,335	—
1975	8,889	+0.92%
1982	8,805	−0.14%
1990	8,055	−1.11%
1999	7,595	−0.65%
2007	7,503	−0.15%
2012	7,260	−0.66%
2017	6,634	−1.79%
2023	5,985	−1.70%
Source: INSEE

== Points of Interest ==
=== Museums ===
- Musée Charles Léandre - Based in Condé-sur-Noireau, museum dedicated to Charles Lucien Léandre and other Normandy based artists.
- Musée de l'Imprimerie Typographique - a museum dedicated to Typographic Printing based in Condé-sur-Noireau.

=== National heritage sites ===
The Commune has two buildings and areas listed as a Monument historique

- Galland-Duclos House an eighteenth century private house, that was classed as a Monument historique in 1996.
- House on Grand Rue - listed as a monument in 1929, it was destroyed in the second world war.
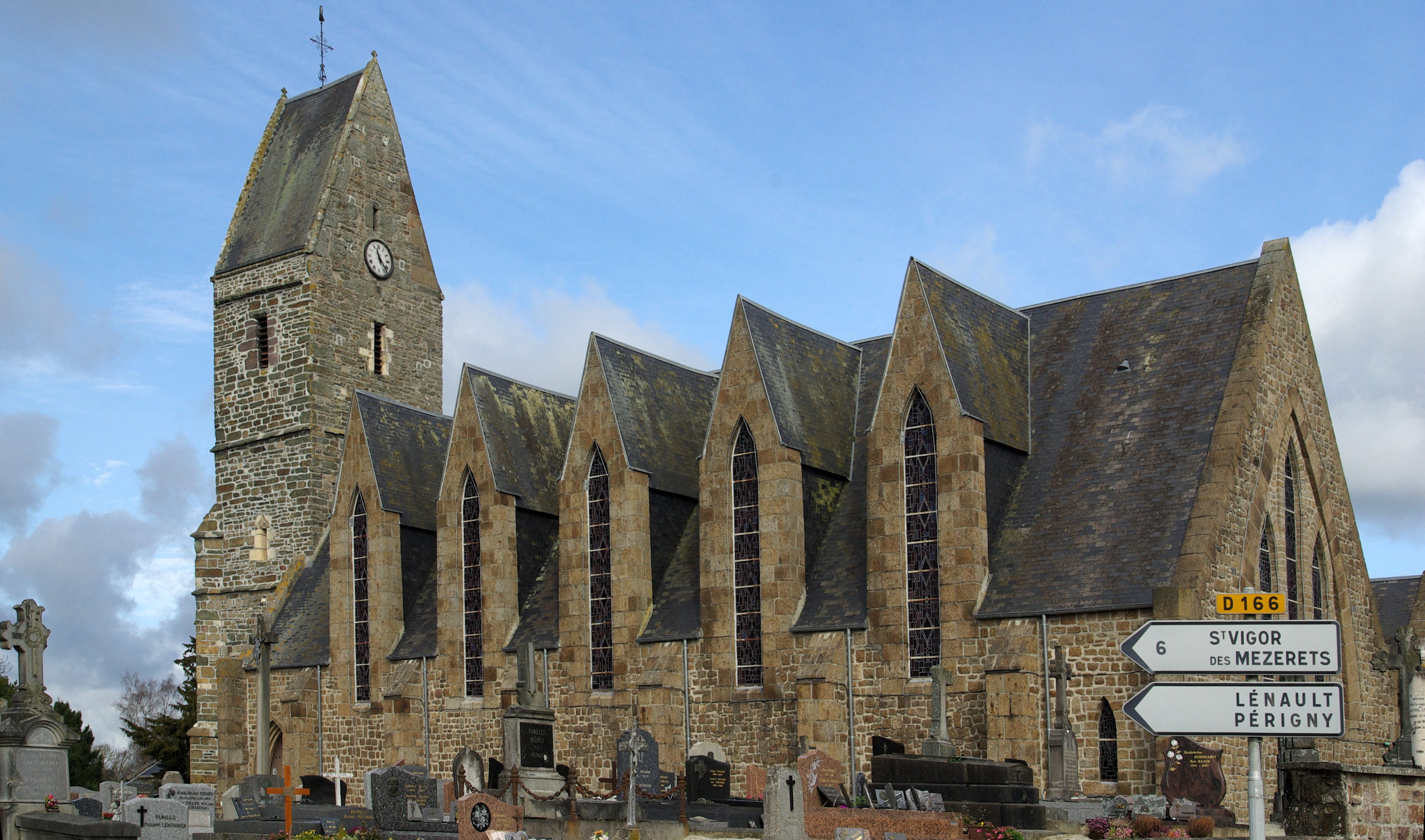
Saint-Pierre-la-Vieille Church

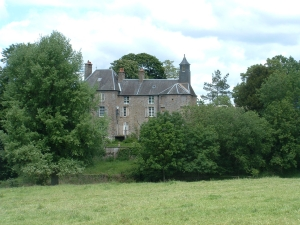
Chateau dor bigny

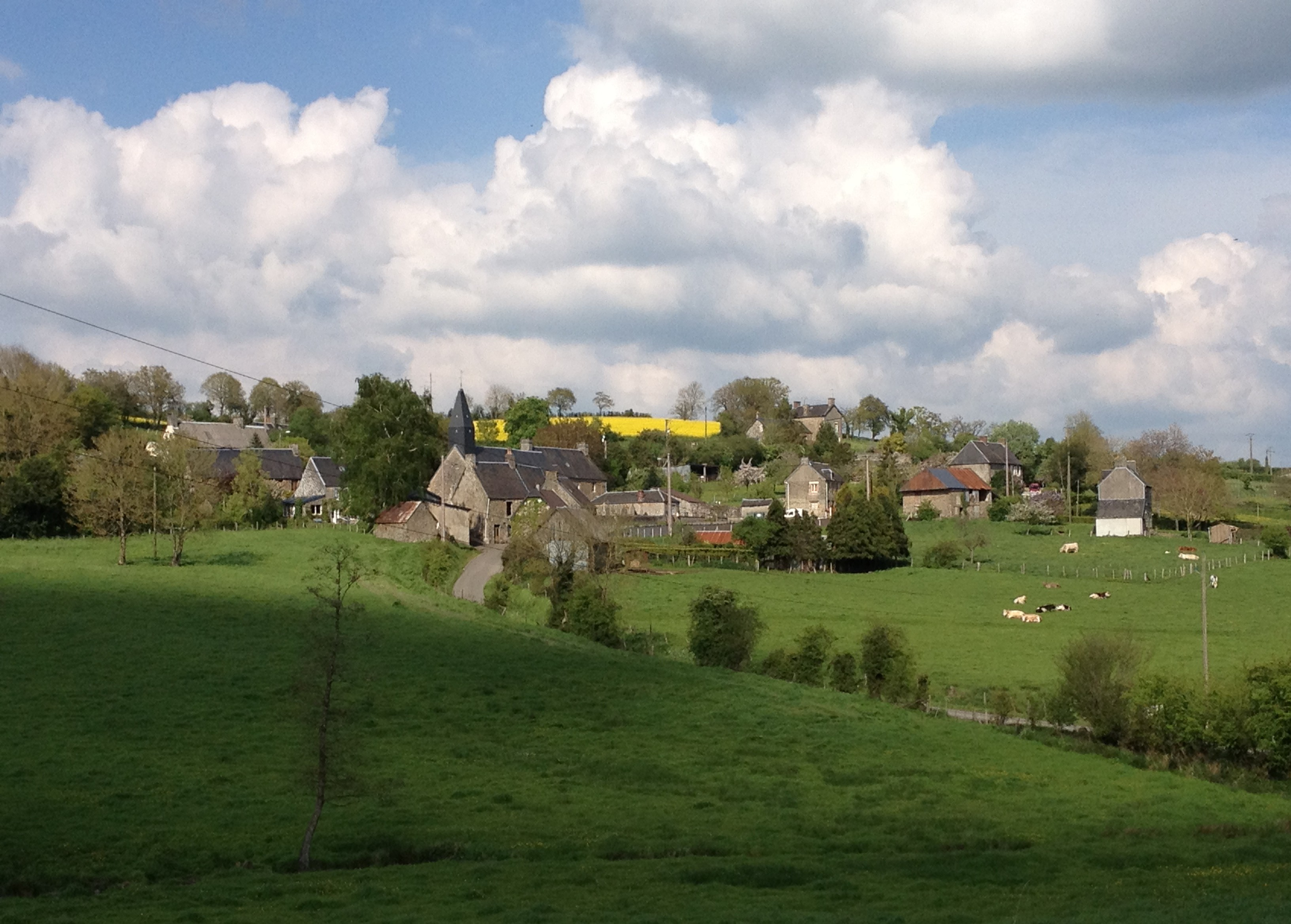
La Chapelle-Engerbold

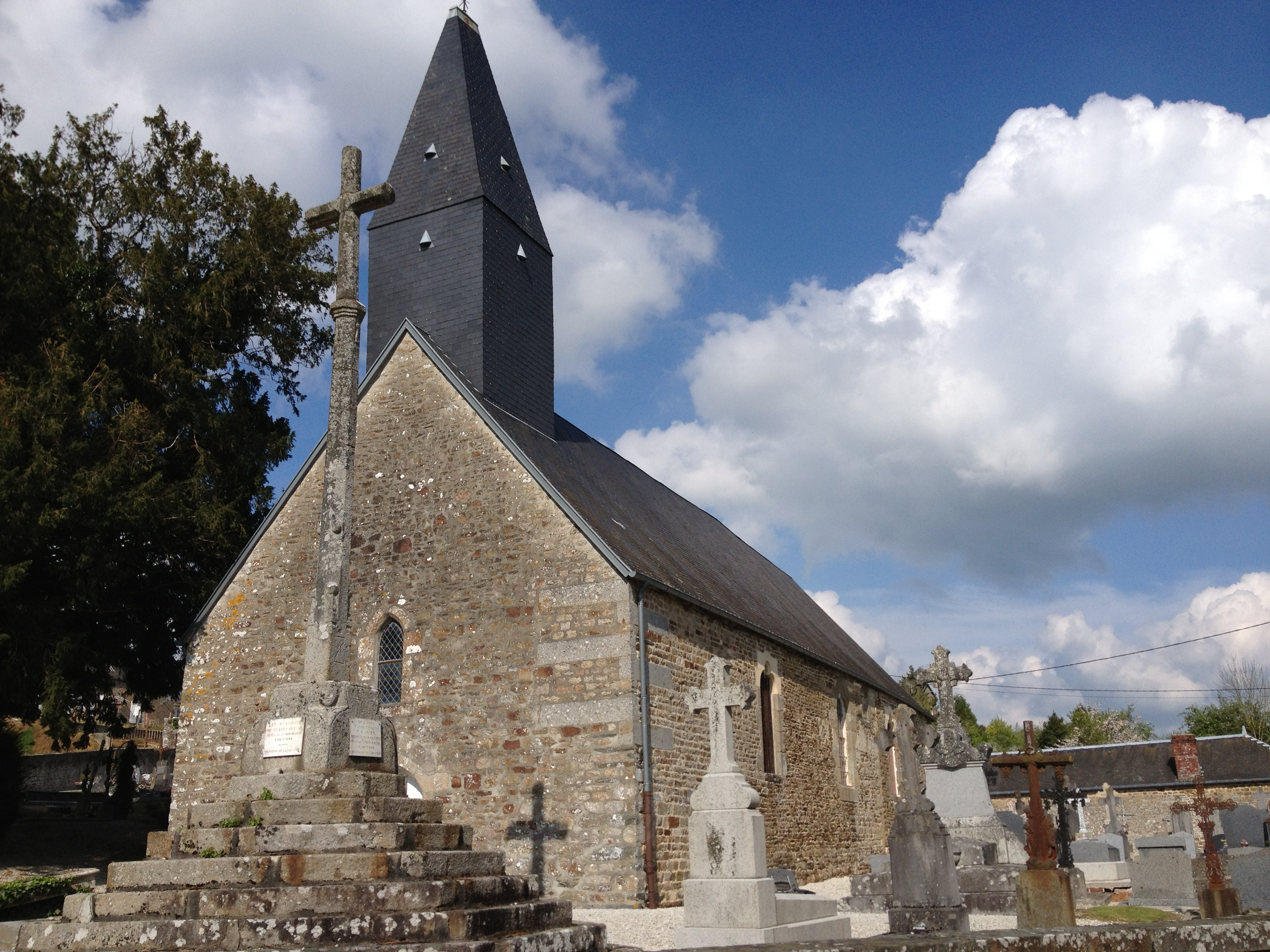
Saint-Gerbold church in La Chapelle Engerbold

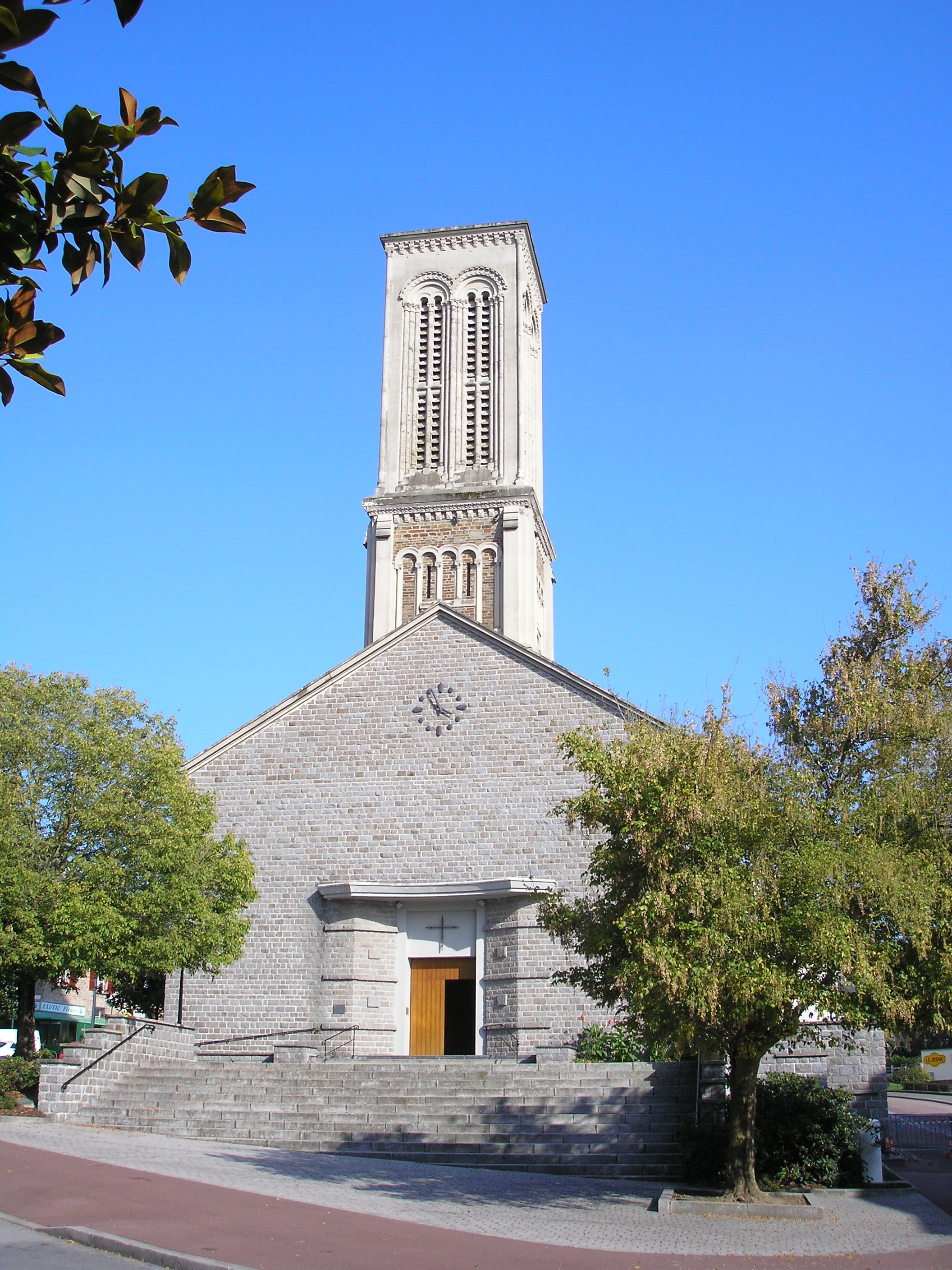
Saint Sauveur Church in Condé-sur-Noireau

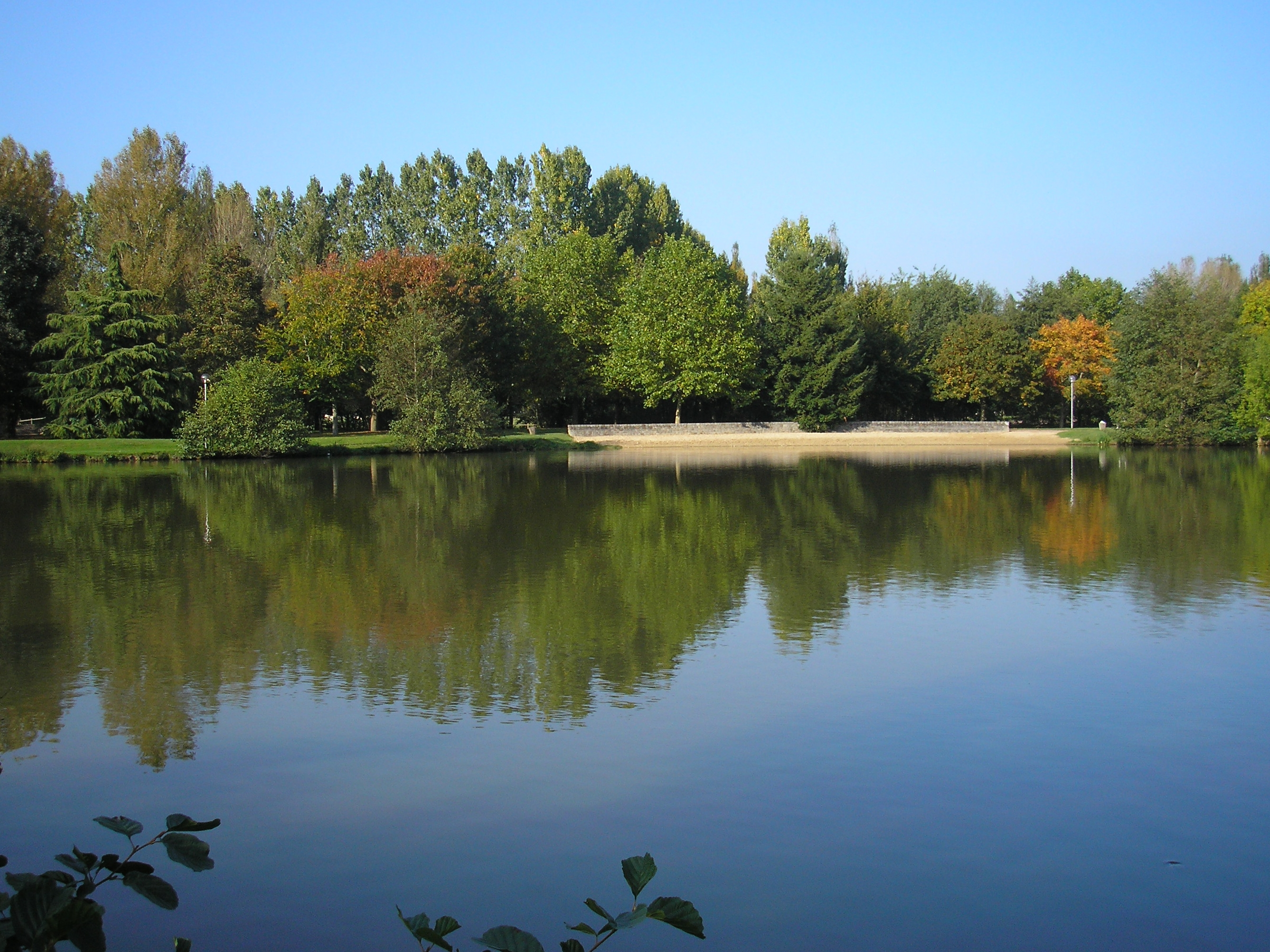
Condé-sur-Noireau Municipal lake with beach

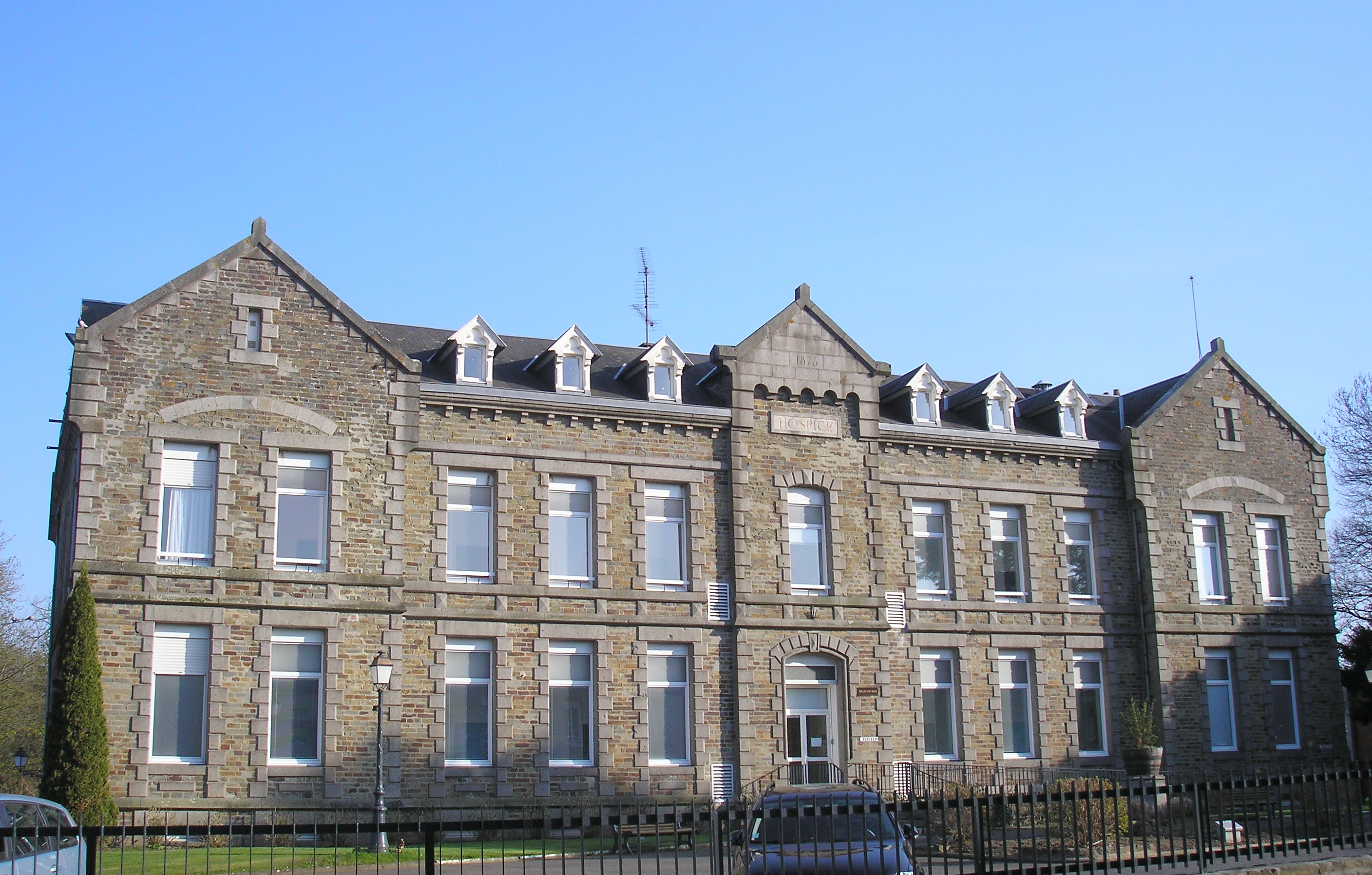
Hospice in Condé-sur-Noireau

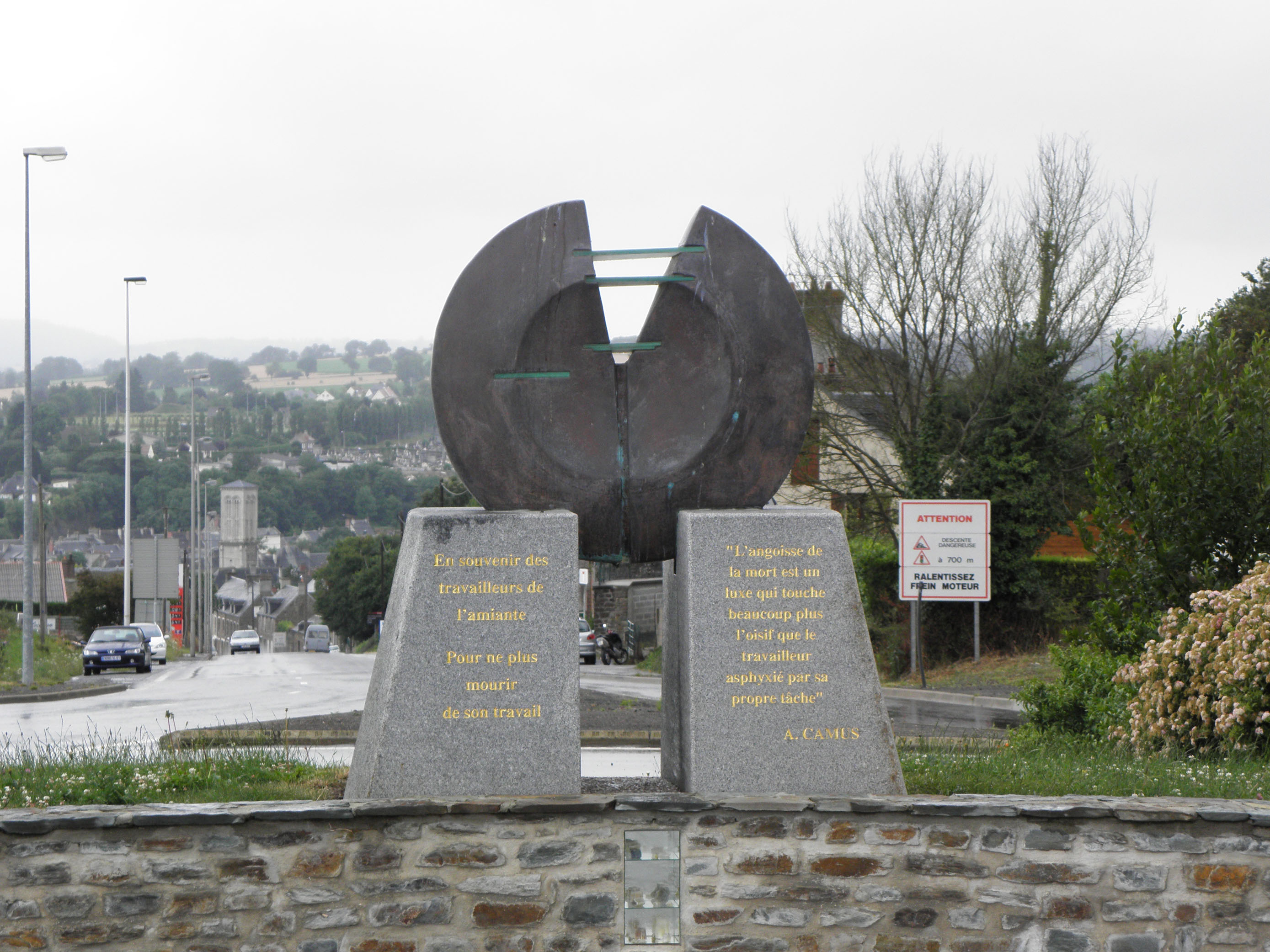
Monument dedicated to asbestos victims in Condé-sur-Noireau

== Notable people ==
- Jules Dumont d'Urville - (1790 – 1842) a French explorer and naval officer who explored the south and western Pacific, Australia, New Zealand, and Antarctica, was born here.
- Henri Duret - (1849 - 1921) a French neurologist whose contributions to the knowledge of cerebral circulation and the physiology of the brainstem were important for the early years of brain surgery, was born here.
- Maximilien Vox - (1894–1974) a French writer, cartoonist, illustrator, publisher, journalist, critic art theorist and historian of the French letter and typography, was born here.
- Michèle Fabien - (1945 – 1999) a Belgian writer and playwright, is buried at Saint-Pierre-la-Vieille cemetery.

== Sport ==
Condé-en-Normandie has a swimming pool the Espace Aquatique de Condé-en-Normandie, which has been open since 1999.

== Twin towns – sister cities ==
Condé-en-Normandie is twinned with:

- Ross-on-Wye, United Kingdom since 1980
- Elsenfeld, Germany since 2004

=== Former Twin Towns ===
- Poggio Rusco, Italy - from 1999 to 2021.

== See also ==
- Communes of the Calvados department
