= Cauville =

- Commune
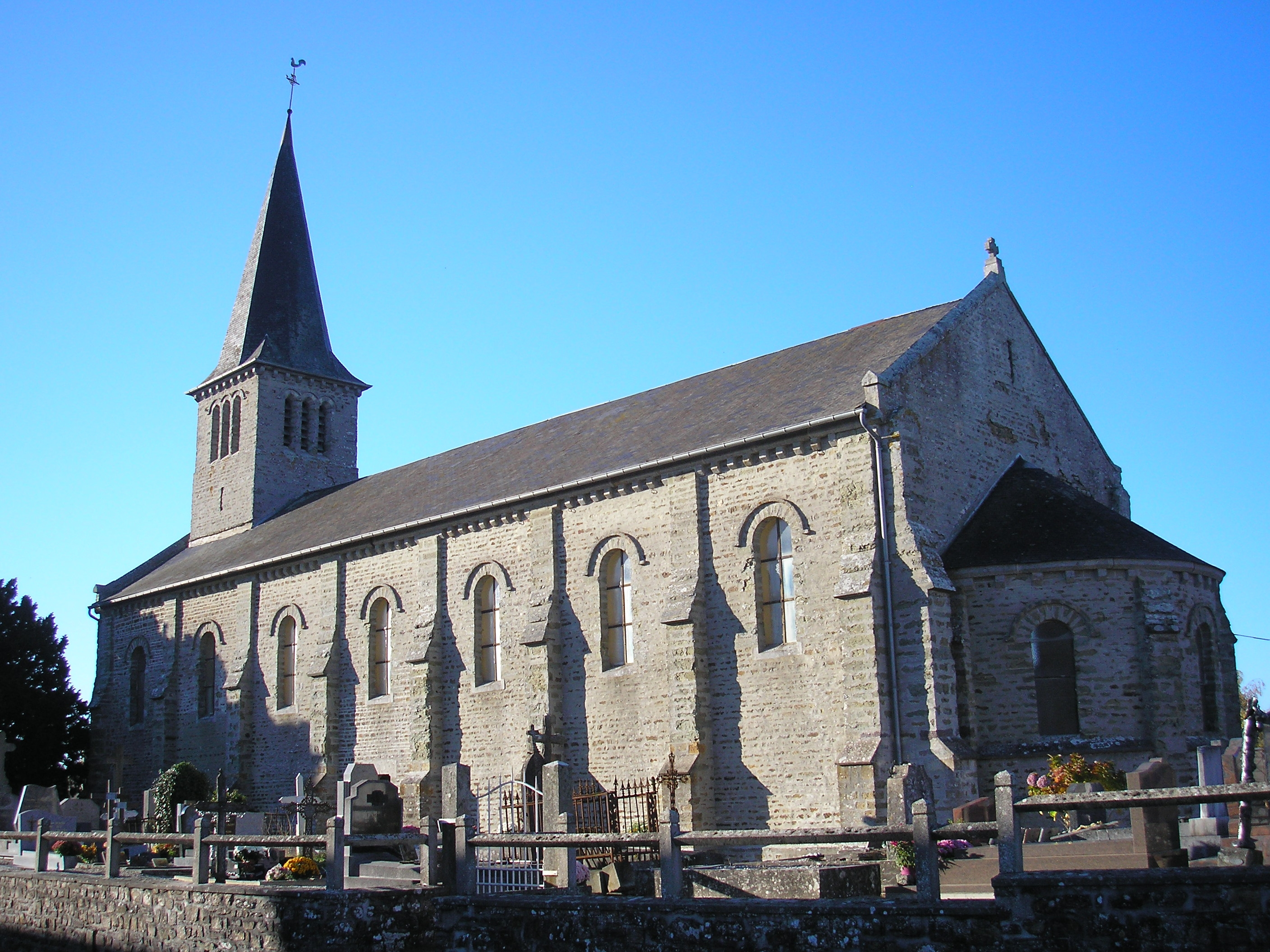
- The church in Cauville
- Location of Cauville
- Location within France Location within Normandy
- Coordinates: 48°56′53″N 0°34′18″W
- Country: France
- Region: Normandy
- Department: Calvados
- Arrondissement: Caen
- Canton: Le Hom
- Intercommunality: Cingal-Suisse Normande

Government
  - Mayor (2020–2026): Delphine Tasteyre
- Area^{1}: 5.76 km^{2} (2.22 sq mi)
- Elevation: 280 m (920 ft)
- Highest elevation: 267 m (876 ft)
- Lowest elevation: 80 m (260 ft)
- Population (2023): 170
  - Density: 30/km^{2} (76/sq mi)
- Time zone: UTC+01:00 (CET)
  - Summer (DST): UTC+02:00 (CEST)
- INSEE/Postal code: 14146 /14770
- ^{1} French Land Register data, which excludes lakes, ponds, glaciers > 1 km^{2} (0.386 sq mi or 247 acres) and river estuaries.

Cauville (French pronunciation: [kovil]) is a commune in the Calvados department in the Normandy region in northwestern France.

== Geography ==
The commune is part of the area known as Suisse Normande.

The commune is made up of the following collection of villages and hamlets, La Lande, La Mogisière, La Brocquetière and Cauville.

The Commune along with another nine communes shares part of a 5,729 hectare, Natura 2000 conservation area, called the Bassin de la Druance.

The commune has four streams running through it: The Hamelet, The Val Quebert, The Herbion and The Cresme.

== Population ==
Historical population
Year	Pop.	±% p.a.
1968	186	—
1975	170	−1.28%
1982	131	−3.65%
1990	117	−1.40%
1999	126	+0.83%
2007	161	+3.11%
2012	149	−1.54%
2017	164	+1.94%
2023	170	+0.60%
Source: INSEE

== See also ==
- Communes of the Calvados department
