= Albert S. Gérard =

Belgian scholar of African literature

Albert Stanislaus Gérard (1920–1996) was a Belgian scholar of comparative literature, specializing in African literature. His African Language Literatures was praised by Ngũgĩ wa Thiong'o as a "pioneering survey of literature in African languages".

== Works ==
- L'idée romantique de la poésie en Angleterre. Étude sur la théorie de la poésie chez Coleridge, Wordsworth, Keats et Shelley, 1955. Translated as English romantic poetry : ethos, structure, and symbol in Coleridge, Wordsworth, Shelley, and Keats, 1968
- Four African literatures: Xhosa, Sotho, Zulu, Amharic, 1971
- (ed.) Black Africa, 1972
- African language literatures : an introduction to the literary history of Sub-Saharan Africa, 1981
- European-language writing in sub-Saharan Africa, 1985
- Contexts of African literature, 1990
