= Lénault =

- Part of Condé-en-Normandie
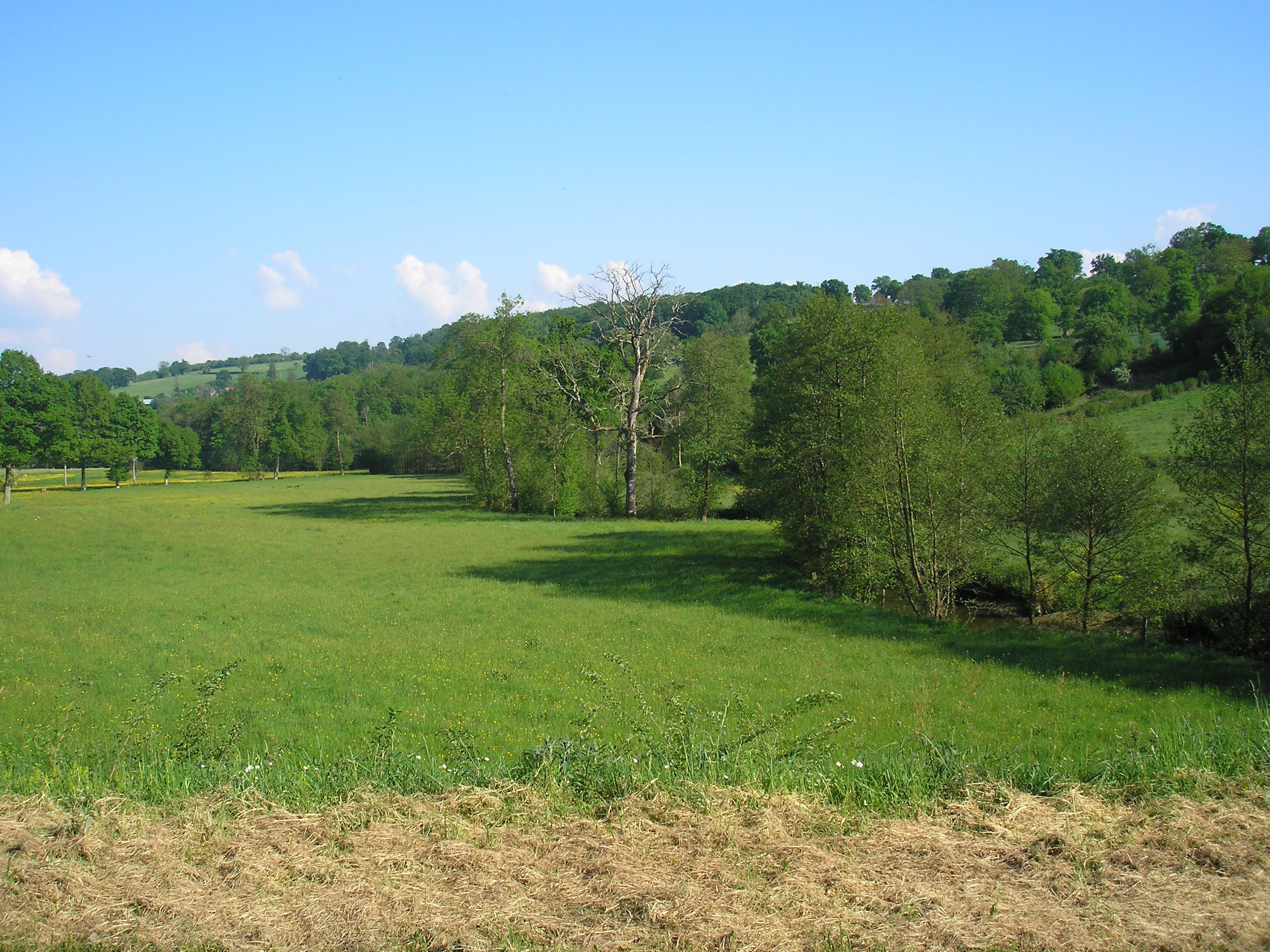
- Location of Lénault
- Location within France Location within Normandy
- Coordinates: 48°56′01″N 0°37′40″W
- Country: France
- Region: Normandy
- Department: Calvados
- Arrondissement: Vire
- Canton: Condé-en-Normandie
- Commune: Condé-en-Normandie
- Area^{1}: 6.67 km^{2} (2.58 sq mi)
- Highest elevation: 248 m (814 ft)
- Lowest elevation: 130 m (430 ft)
- Population (2023): 166
  - Density: 24.9/km^{2} (64.5/sq mi)
- Time zone: UTC+01:00 (CET)
  - Summer (DST): UTC+02:00 (CEST)
- Postal code: 14770
- ^{1} French Land Register data, which excludes lakes, ponds, glaciers > 1 km^{2} (0.386 sq mi or 247 acres) and river estuaries.

Lénault (French pronunciation: [leno]) is a former commune in the Calvados department in the Normandy region in northwestern France. On 1 January 2016, it was merged into the new commune of Condé-en-Normandie.

The former commune is part of the area known as Suisse Normande.

== See also ==
- Communes of the Calvados department
