= Louis Gustave le Doulcet, comte de Pontécoulant =

French politician and military officer (1764–1853)

Louis Gustave le Doulcet de Pontécoulant
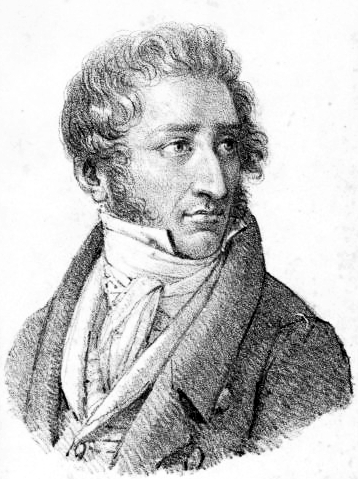
- Louis Gustave le Doulcet de Pontécoulant

President of the National Convention
- In office 4 July 1795 – 19 July 1795

Member of the Council of Five Hundred
- In office 1795–1797

Senator of the First French Empire
- In office 1805–1814

Peer of France
- In office 1814–1853

Personal details
- Born: Louis Gustave le Doulcet de Pontécoulant; 17 November 1764 Caen, Kingdom of France
- Died: 3 April 1853 (aged 88) Paris, France
- Resting place: Père Lachaise Cemetery
- Party: Girondins
- Children: Louis Adolphe le Doulcet; Philippe Gustave le Doulcet
- Known for: Author of Souvenirs historiques et parlementaires

Military service
- Allegiance: Kingdom of France; Kingdom of the French; French First Republic; First French Empire; Bourbon Restoration
- Battles/wars: French Revolutionary Wars; Napoleonic Wars; War of the Sixth Coalition

Louis Gustave le Doulcet, comte de Pontécoulant (French pronunciation: [lwi ɡystav lə dulsɛ kɔ̃t də pɔ̃tekulɑ̃]; 17 November 1764 – 3 April 1853) was a French politician and military officer. He was the father of Louis Adolphe le Doulcet and Philippe Gustave le Doulcet.

== Early life ==
Born in Caen on 17 November 1764, he began a military career with the Compagnie Écossaise of the Garde du corps du Roi in 1778, becoming lieutenant colonel in 1791.

== Career ==
=== National Convention ===
A moderate supporter of the French Revolution, he was elected to the National Convention for the département of Calvados in 1792, and became commissioner with the Army of the North during the French Revolutionary Wars.

He voted for the imprisonment of King Louis XVI during the war, and his banishment after the peace. He then attached himself to the Girondists, voting in favor of Jean-Paul Marat's prosecution, and was consequently declared an enemy of the people in August 1793,. being pursued by the Reign of Terror and taking refuge to Switzerland.

In July, Charlotte Corday, the assassin of Marat, asked Le Doulcet to defend her, but he did not receive in time her letter so Claude François Chauveau-Lagarde was appointed instead to assist her during the trial. However, it is said that Corday thought that Le Doulcet refused to defend her and sent to him a last letter of reproach just before going to the scaffold.

=== Thermidor and Directory ===
He returned to the Thermidorian Convention on 8 March 1795, and was noted for his moderation, especially after defending Prieur de la Marne and Jean-Baptiste Robert Lindet. President of the Convention in July 1795, he was for some months a member of the Council of Public Safety.

Doulcet was subsequently elected to the French Directory's Council of Five Hundred, but was suspected of Royalist sympathies, and had to spend some time in retirement between anti-monarchist coup of 18 Fructidor (4 September 1797) and the establishment of the Consulate (the 18 Brumaire coup of 9 November 1799).

=== Empire and Restoration ===
Becoming senator of the First French Empire in 1805, and count of the Empire in 1808, he organized the national guard in Franche-Comté in 1811, and the defence of the north-eastern frontier in 1813.

During the 1814 Bourbon Restoration, Louis XVIII made him a Peer of France, and although he received a similar honor from Napoleon during the Hundred Days, he remained in the upper house after the return of the king.

He died in Paris, leaving memoirs and correspondence from which were extracted four volumes (1861–1865) of Souvenirs historiques et parlementaires, 1764-1848.
