= La Chapelle-Engerbold =

- Part of Condé-en-Normandie
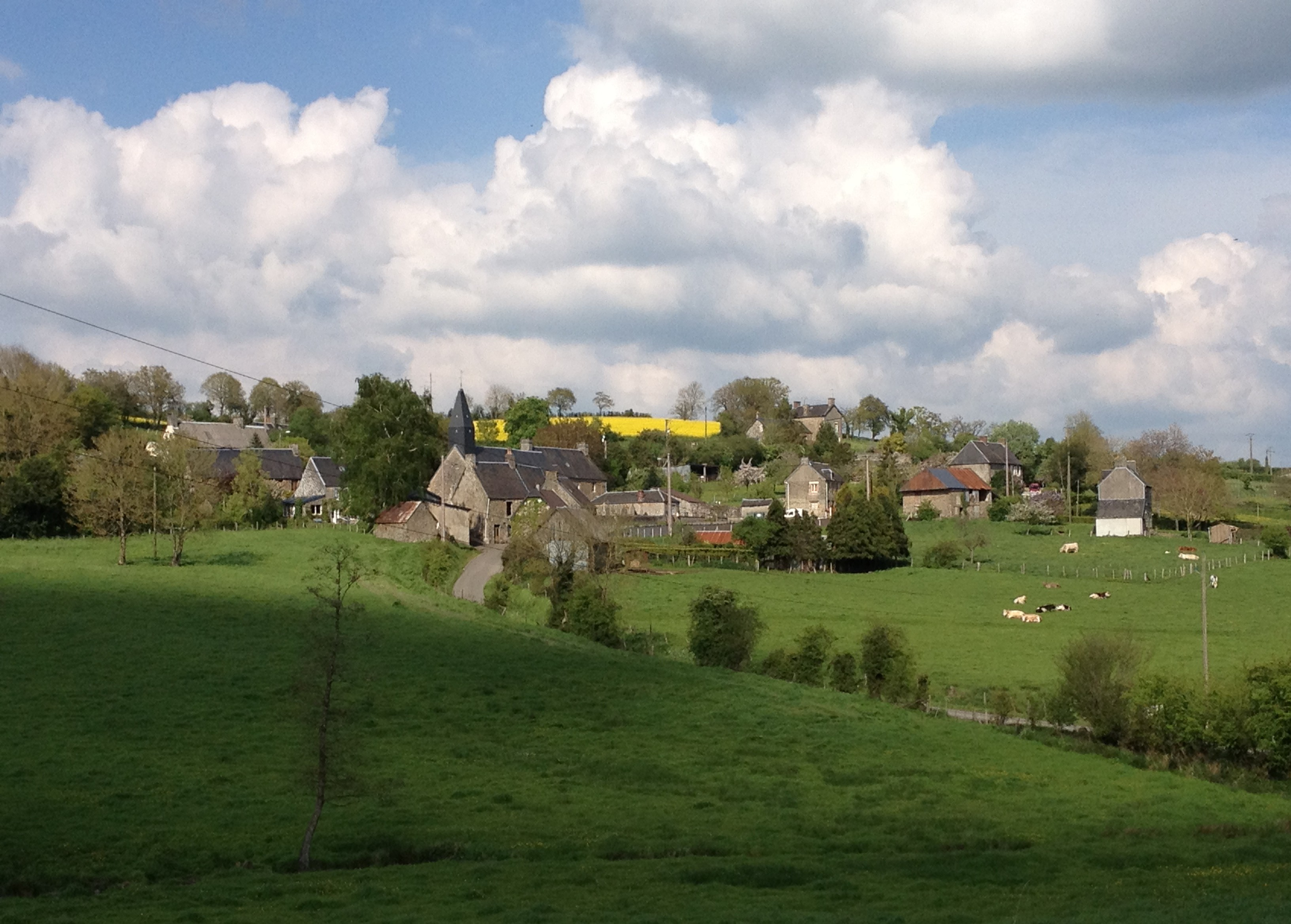
- La Chapelle-Engerbold
- Location of La Chapelle-Engerbold
- Location within France Location within Normandy
- Coordinates: 48°53′32″N 0°36′27″W
- Country: France
- Region: Normandy
- Department: Calvados
- Arrondissement: Vire
- Canton: Condé-en-Normandie
- Commune: Condé-en-Normandie
- Area^{1}: 4.07 km^{2} (1.57 sq mi)
- Elevation: 50 m (160 ft)
- Highest elevation: 206 m (676 ft)
- Lowest elevation: 98 m (322 ft)
- Population (2023): 86
  - Density: 21/km^{2} (55/sq mi)
- Time zone: UTC+01:00 (CET)
  - Summer (DST): UTC+02:00 (CEST)
- Postal code: 14770
- ^{1} French Land Register data, which excludes lakes, ponds, glaciers > 1 km^{2} (0.386 sq mi or 247 acres) and river estuaries.

La Chapelle-Engerbold (French pronunciation: [la ʃapɛl ɑ̃ʒɛʁbo] or [la ʃapɛl ɑ̃ʒɛʁbɔld]) is a former commune in the Calvados department in the Normandy region in northwestern France. On 1 January 2016, it was merged into the new commune of Condé-en-Normandie.

The former commune is part of the area known as Suisse Normande.

== See also ==
- Communes of the Calvados department
