= Proussy =

- Part of Condé-en-Normandie
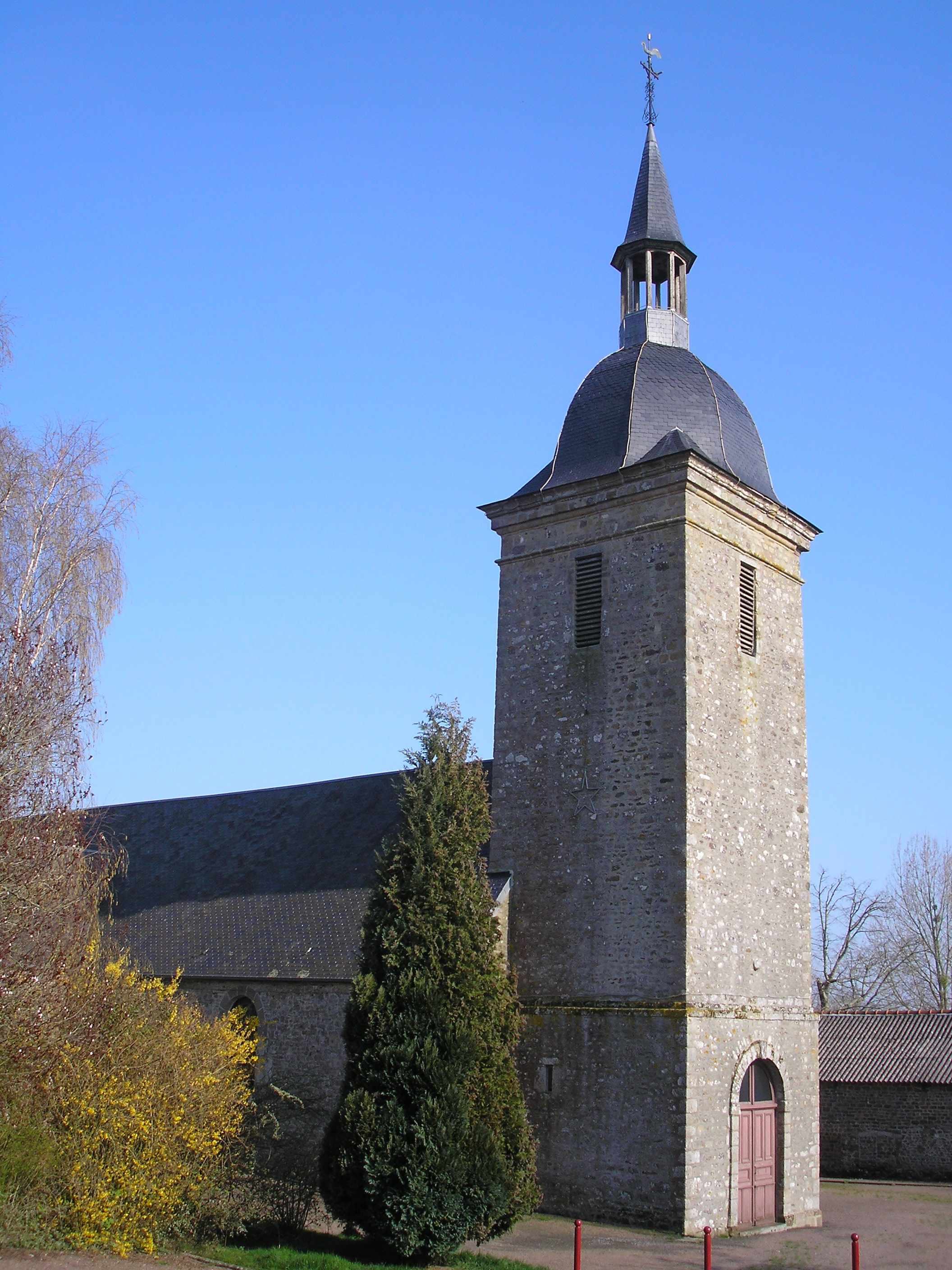
- Location of Proussy
- Location within France Location within Normandy
- Coordinates: 48°52′57″N 0°32′10″W
- Country: France
- Region: Normandy
- Department: Calvados
- Arrondissement: Vire
- Canton: Condé-en-Normandie
- Commune: Condé-en-Normandie
- Area^{1}: 12.64 km^{2} (4.88 sq mi)
- Highest elevation: 256 m (840 ft)
- Lowest elevation: 82 m (269 ft)
- Population (2022): 362
  - Density: 28.6/km^{2} (74.2/sq mi)
- Time zone: UTC+01:00 (CET)
  - Summer (DST): UTC+02:00 (CEST)
- Postal code: 14110
- ^{1} French Land Register data, which excludes lakes, ponds, glaciers > 1 km^{2} (0.386 sq mi or 247 acres) and river estuaries.

Proussy (French pronunciation: [pʁusi]) is a former commune in the Calvados department in the Normandy region in northwestern France. On 1 January 2016, it was merged into the new commune of Condé-en-Normandie.

In August 1944 as World War II was being fought, Proussy served as the location of Field Marshal Bernard Law Montgomery's tactical headquarters.

The former commune is part of the area known as Suisse Normande.
