= Condé-sur-Noireau =

- Part of Condé-en-Normandie
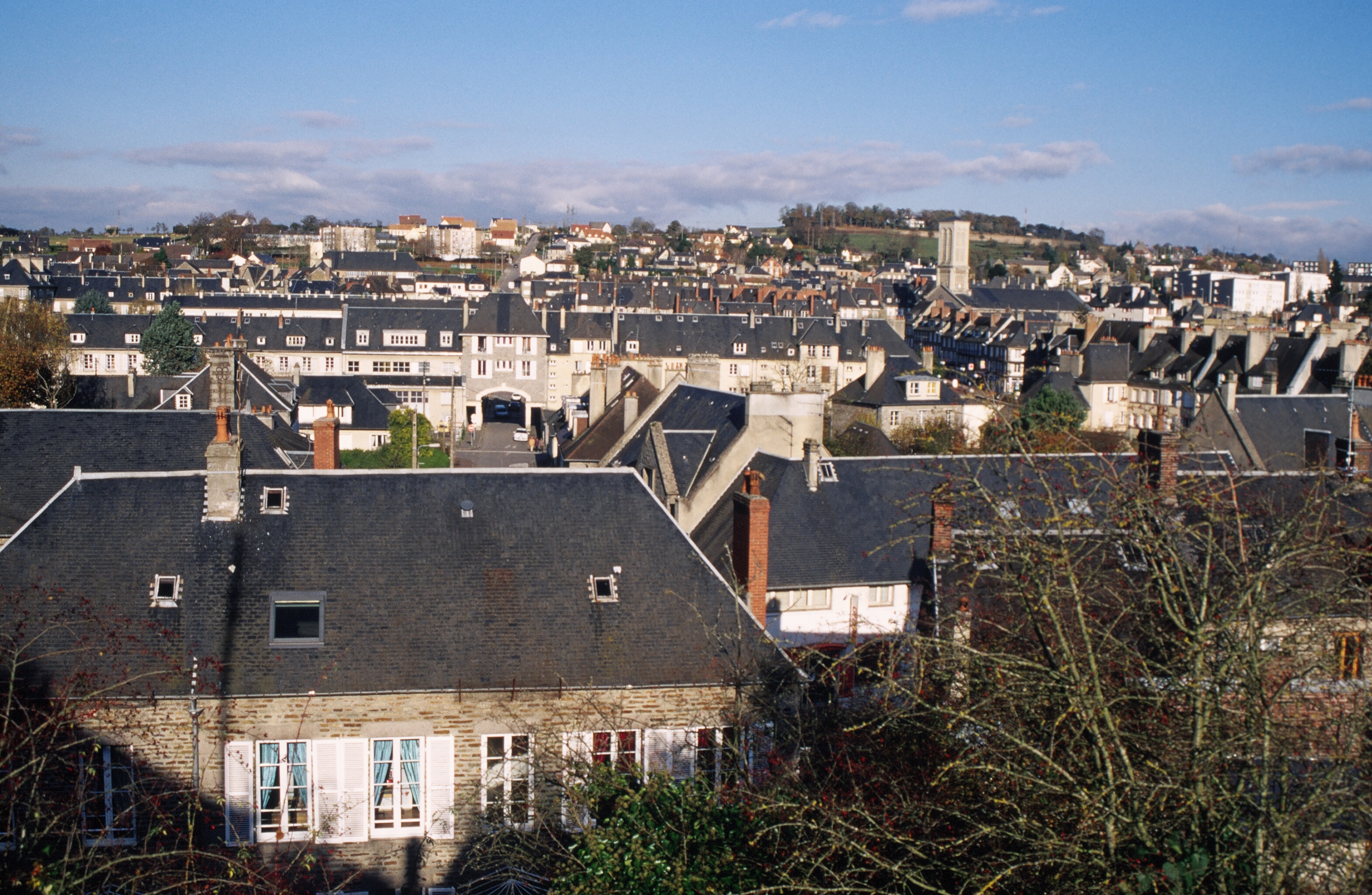

- Coat of arms
- Location of Condé-sur-Noireau
- Location within France Location within Normandy
- Coordinates: 48°51′N 0°33′W
- Country: France
- Region: Normandy
- Department: Calvados
- Arrondissement: Vire
- Canton: Condé-en-Normandie
- Commune: Condé-en-Normandie
- Area^{1}: 12.53 km^{2} (4.84 sq mi)
- Elevation: 84 m (276 ft)
- Highest elevation: 173 m (568 ft)
- Lowest elevation: 72 m (236 ft)
- Population (2022): 4,211
  - Density: 336.1/km^{2} (870.4/sq mi)
- Time zone: UTC+01:00 (CET)
  - Summer (DST): UTC+02:00 (CEST)
- Postal code: 14110
- ^{1} French Land Register data, which excludes lakes, ponds, glaciers > 1 km^{2} (0.386 sq mi or 247 acres) and river estuaries.

Condé-sur-Noireau (French pronunciation: [kɔ̃de syʁ nwaʁo], lit. 'Condé on Noireau') is a former commune in the Calvados department in the Normandy region in northwestern France. On 1 January 2016, it was merged into the new commune of Condé-en-Normandie. It is situated on the Noireau River. In the fifteenth century, the town was occupied by the English, and belonged to Sir John Fastolf of Caister Castle in Norfolk (1380–1459). It was from here that the Spanish mercenary François de Surienne launched an attack on Fougères in Brittany, which triggered the invasion of English Normandy by Charles VII of France, and the end of the Hundred Years' War.

The former commune is part of the area known as Suisse Normande.

== Population ==
Historical population

Year	Pop.	±% p.a.
1793	4,327	—
1800	3,700	−2.21%
1806	3,925	+0.99%
1821	5,436	+2.19%
1831	5,562	+0.23%
1836	6,449	+3.00%
1841	5,976	−1.51%
1846	6,355	+1.24%
1851	6,368	+0.04%
1856	6,969	+1.82%
1861	7,234	+0.75%
1866	6,643	−1.69%
1872	6,871	+0.56%
1876	7,350	+1.70%
1881	7,279	−0.19%
1886	7,252	−0.07%
1891	6,764	−1.38%
1896	6,663	−0.30%

Year	Pop.	±% p.a.
1901	6,591	−0.22%
1906	6,247	−1.07%
1911	5,604	−2.15%
1921	5,357	−0.45%
1926	4,937	−1.62%
1931	4,852	−0.35%
1936	4,800	−0.22%
1946	3,358	−3.51%
1954	4,277	+3.07%
1962	6,231	+4.82%
1968	6,568	+0.88%
1975	7,287	+1.50%
1982	7,098	−0.37%
1990	6,309	−1.46%
1999	5,820	−0.89%
2006	5,603	−0.54%
2022	4,211	−1.77%

Source: EHESS and INSEE

== International relations ==
The commune is twinned with:

- Ross-on-Wye, UK since 1978.
- Poggio Rusco, Italy since 2000.

== See also ==
- Communes of the Calvados department
