= Saint-Germain-du-Crioult =

- Part of Condé-en-Normandie
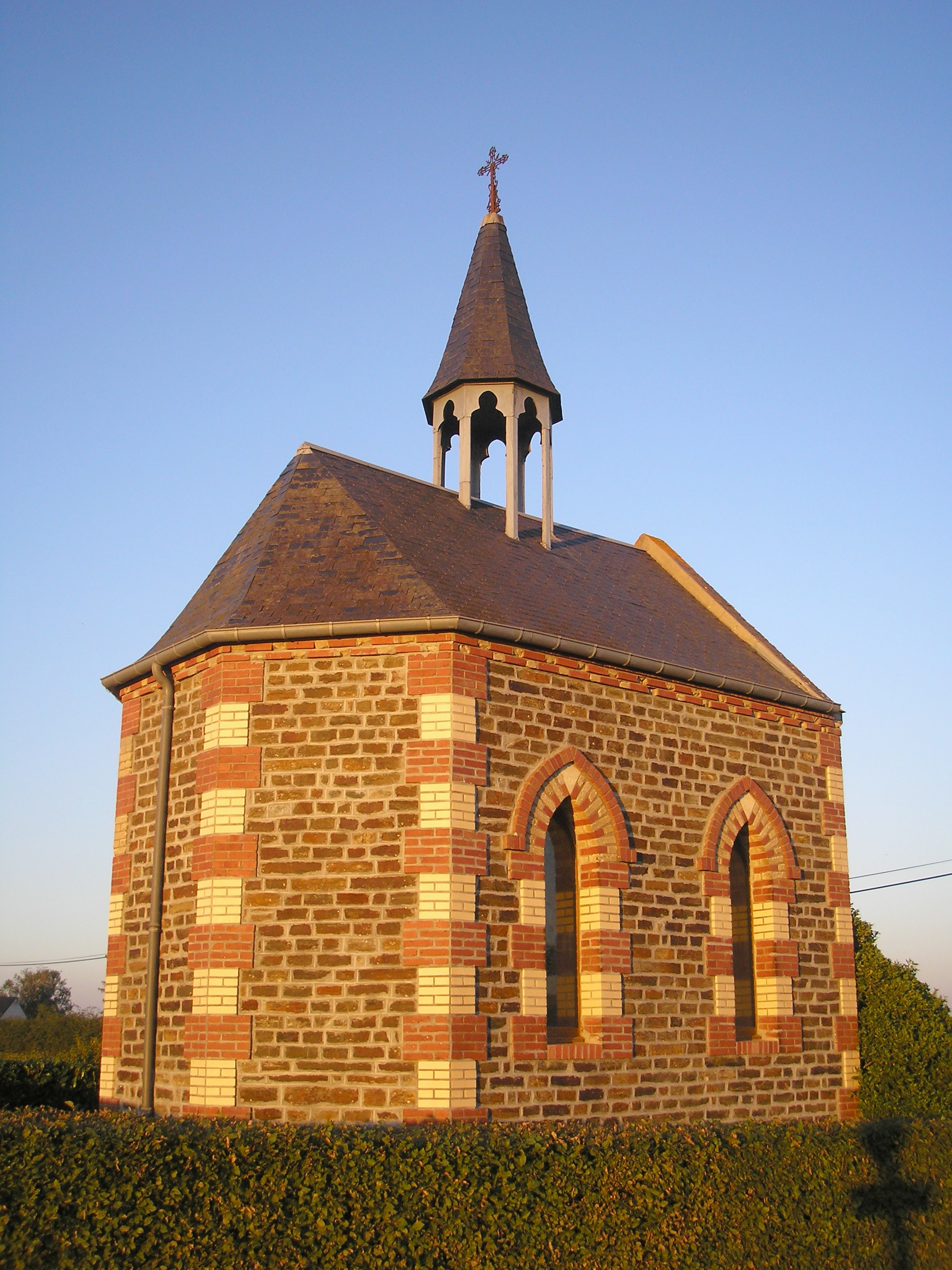
- Location of Saint-Germain-du-Crioult
- Location within France Location within Normandy
- Coordinates: 48°51′28″N 0°36′15″W
- Country: France
- Region: Normandy
- Department: Calvados
- Arrondissement: Vire
- Canton: Condé-en-Normandie
- Commune: Condé-en-Normandie
- Area^{1}: 14.64 km^{2} (5.65 sq mi)
- Elevation: 162 m (531 ft)
- Highest elevation: 202 m (663 ft)
- Lowest elevation: 82 m (269 ft)
- Population (2023): 862
  - Density: 58.9/km^{2} (152/sq mi)
- Time zone: UTC+01:00 (CET)
  - Summer (DST): UTC+02:00 (CEST)
- Postal code: 14110
- ^{1} French Land Register data, which excludes lakes, ponds, glaciers > 1 km^{2} (0.386 sq mi or 247 acres) and river estuaries.

Saint-Germain-du-Crioult (French pronunciation: [sɛ̃ ʒɛʁmɛ̃ dy kʁiju]) is a former commune in the Calvados department in the Normandy region in northwestern France. On 1 January 2016, it was merged into the new commune of Condé-en-Normandie.

The former commune is part of the area known as Suisse Normande.

== See also ==
- Communes of the Calvados department
