= Noireau =

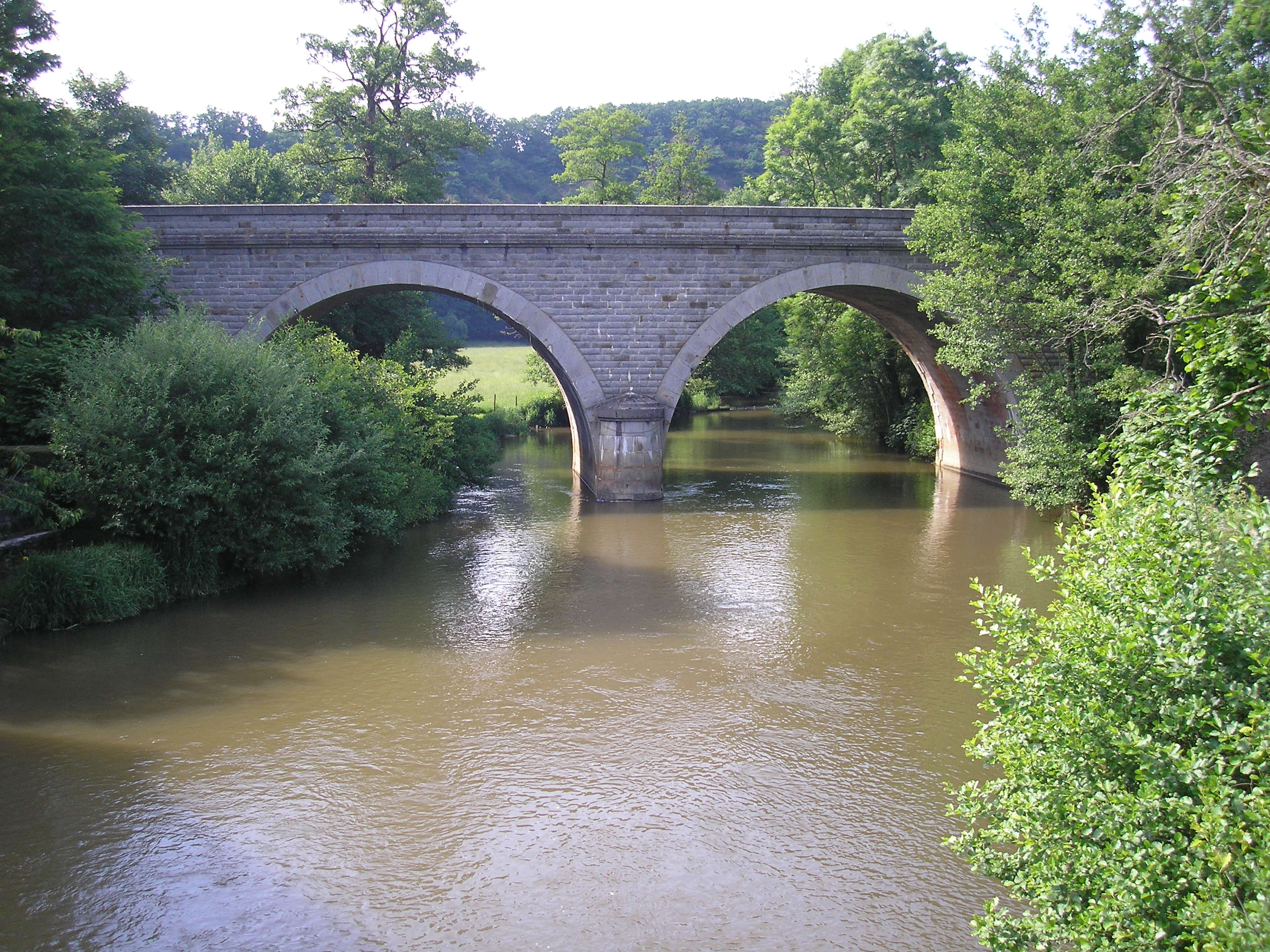
- Former railway bridge on the Caen - Flers - Laval line crossing the Noireau at a place called Pont-Erambourg in Saint-Denis-de-Méré

- Location within France Location within Normandy

Location
- Country: France

Physical characteristics
- Source
  - location: Saint-Christophe-de-Chaulieu, Orne
- Mouth: Orne
  - coordinates: 48°52′17″N 0°24′34.9″W
- Length: 43.26 km (26.88 mi)

Basin features
- Progression: Orne→ English Channel

The Noireau (French pronunciation: [nwaʁo]) is a river in northwestern France, crossing the departments of Orne and Calvados. It is 43.26 km long. Its source is in Saint-Christophe-de-Chaulieu, and it flows into the river Orne on the border of the communes of Ménil-Hubert-sur-Orne and through Suisse Normande.

== Tributaries ==
A list of the major tributaries of the Noireau:

- The Druance
- The Vère
- The Diane
- The Durance

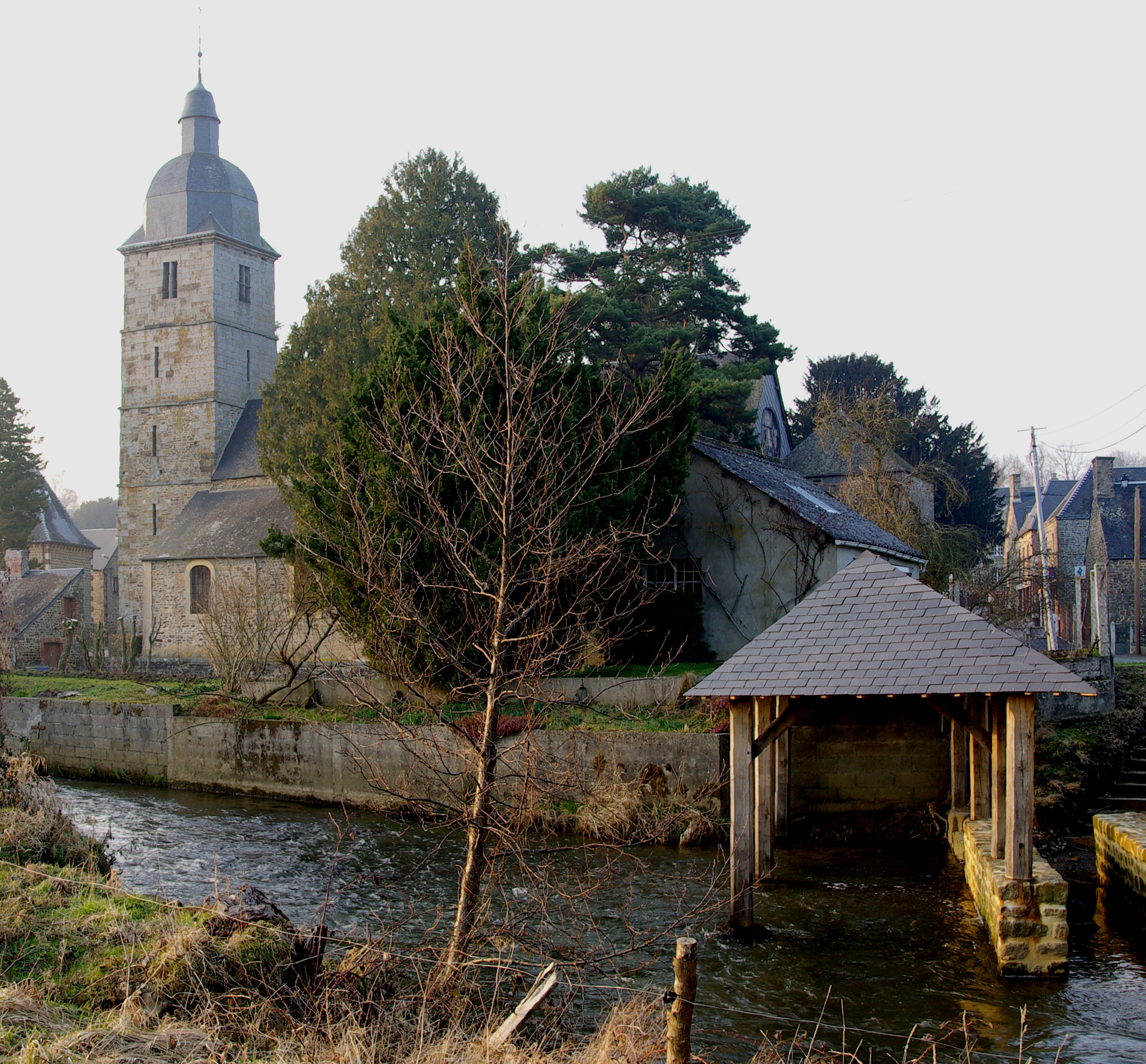
Montsecret Lavoir and Church on the Noireau

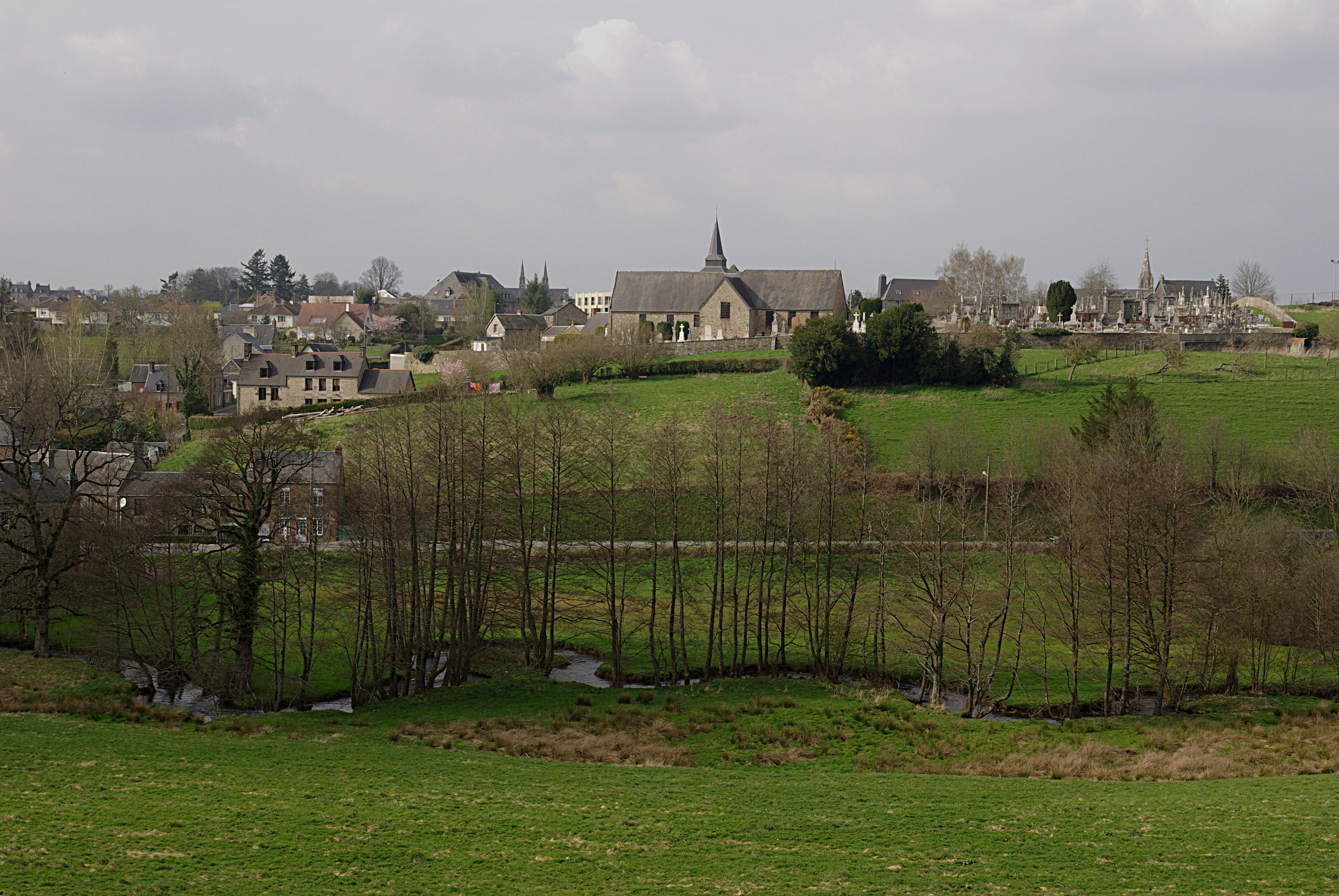
Noireau flowing through Tinchebray Montiers
