= Saint-Pierre-la-Vieille =

- Part of Condé-en-Normandie
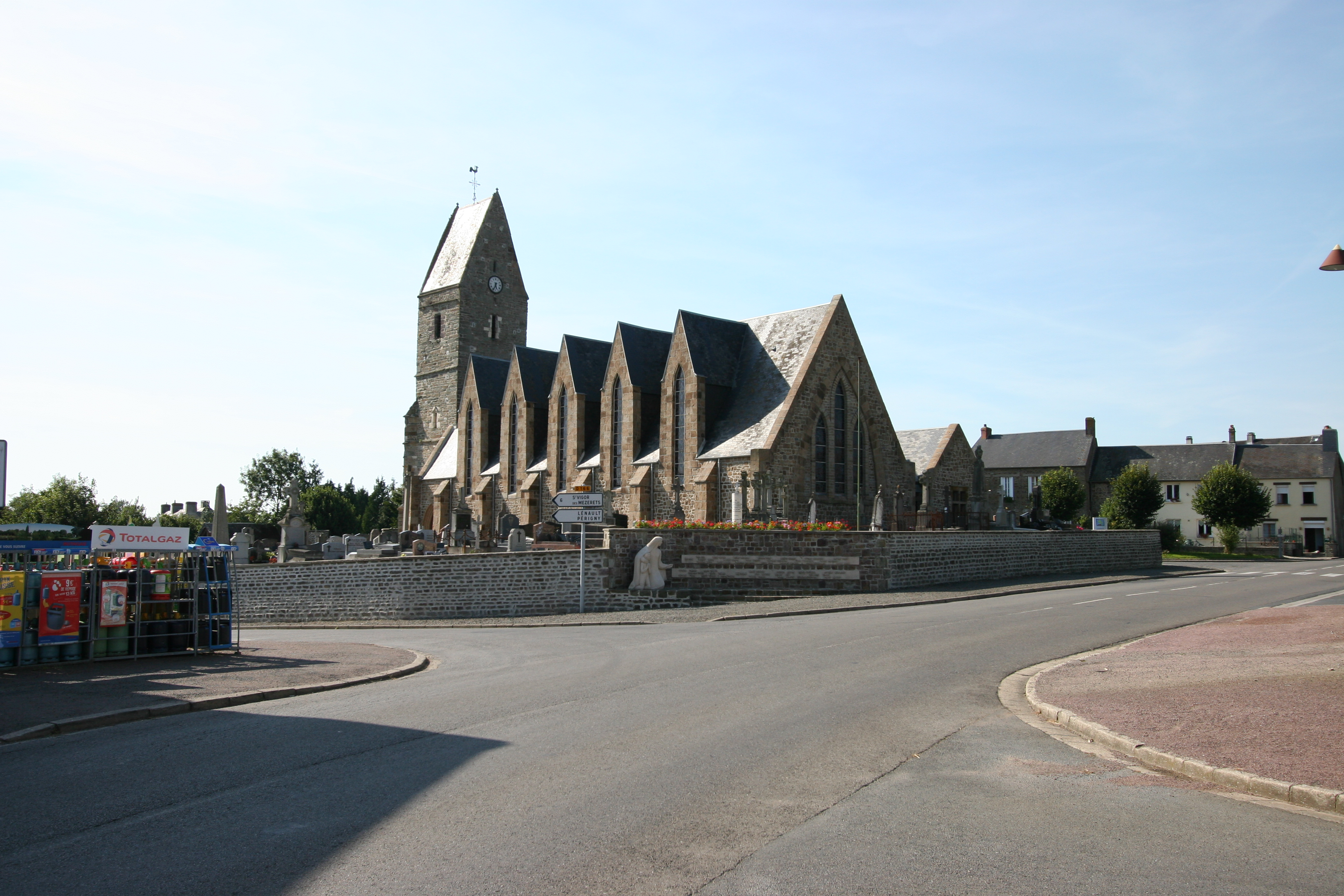
- Location of Saint-Pierre-la-Vieille
- Location within France Location within Normandy
- Coordinates: 48°55′08″N 0°34′34″W
- Country: France
- Region: Normandy
- Department: Calvados
- Arrondissement: Vire
- Canton: Condé-en-Normandie
- Commune: Condé-en-Normandie
- Area^{1}: 12.43 km^{2} (4.80 sq mi)
- Elevation: 250 m (820 ft)
- Highest elevation: 252 m (827 ft)
- Lowest elevation: 117 m (384 ft)
- Population (2023): 317
  - Density: 25.5/km^{2} (66.1/sq mi)
- Time zone: UTC+01:00 (CET)
  - Summer (DST): UTC+02:00 (CEST)
- Postal code: 14770
- ^{1} French Land Register data, which excludes lakes, ponds, glaciers > 1 km^{2} (0.386 sq mi or 247 acres) and river estuaries.

Saint-Pierre-la-Vieille (French pronunciation: [sɛ̃ pjɛʁ la vjɛj]) is a former commune in the Calvados department in the Normandy region in northwestern France. On 1 January 2016, it was merged into the new commune of Condé-en-Normandie.

The former commune is part of the area known as Suisse Normande.

== History ==
=== World War II ===
After the liberation of the area by troops of the British 50th infantry division in 1944, engineers of the Ninth Air Force IX Engineering Command began construction of a combat Advanced Landing Ground outside of the town. Declared operational on 14 August, the airfield was designated as "A-19", it was used by the 370th Fighter Group which flew P-38 Lightnings until early September when the unit moved into Central France. Afterward, the airfield was closed.

== See also ==
- Communes of the Calvados department
