= Philippe Gustave le Doulcet, Comte de Pontécoulant =

French astronomer

Philippe Gustave le Doulcet de Pontécoulant
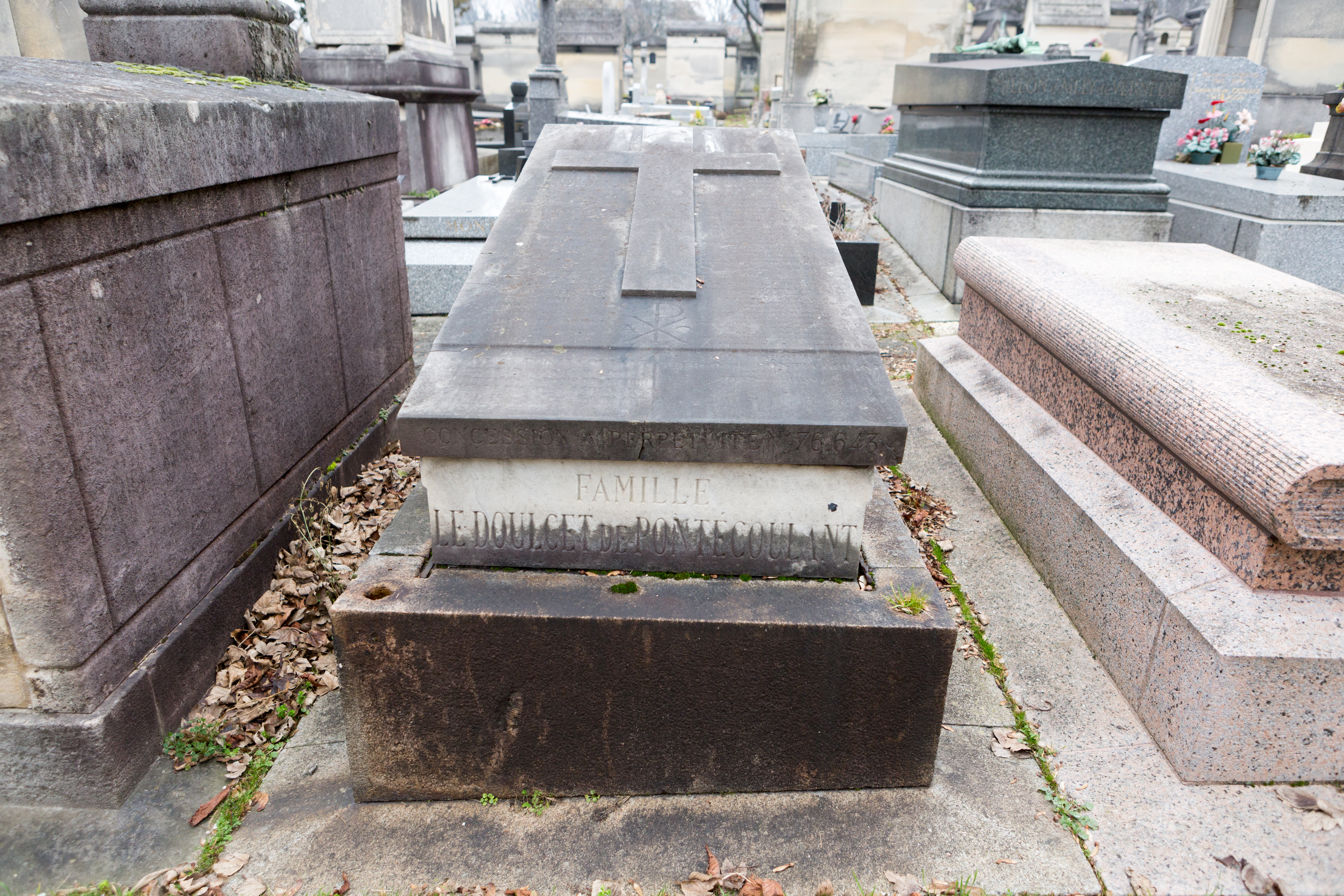
- Grave of Philippe Gustave le Doulcet de Pontécoulant
- Born: 21 June 1795
- Died: 21 July 1874 (aged 79); Pontécoulant
- Resting place: Père Lachaise Cemetery
- Known for: Astronomy
- Parent: Louis Gustave le Doulcet, comte de Pontécoulant

Philippe Gustave Doulcet, Comte de Pontécoulant (1795–1874) was a French astronomer.

He was the younger son of Louis Gustave le Doulcet, Comte de Pontécoulant and was the brother of Louis-Adolphe Pontécoulant. After 1811 he served in the army until 1849. Following his retirement he dedicated himself to the study of mathematics and astronomy.

In 1829 he used the mathematical methods of Poisson and Lagrange to successfully predict the return of Halley's Comet with good precision. His prediction of the perihelion passage was correct to within two days.

He was a member of the French Academy of Sciences. The crater Pontécoulant on the Moon is named after him.

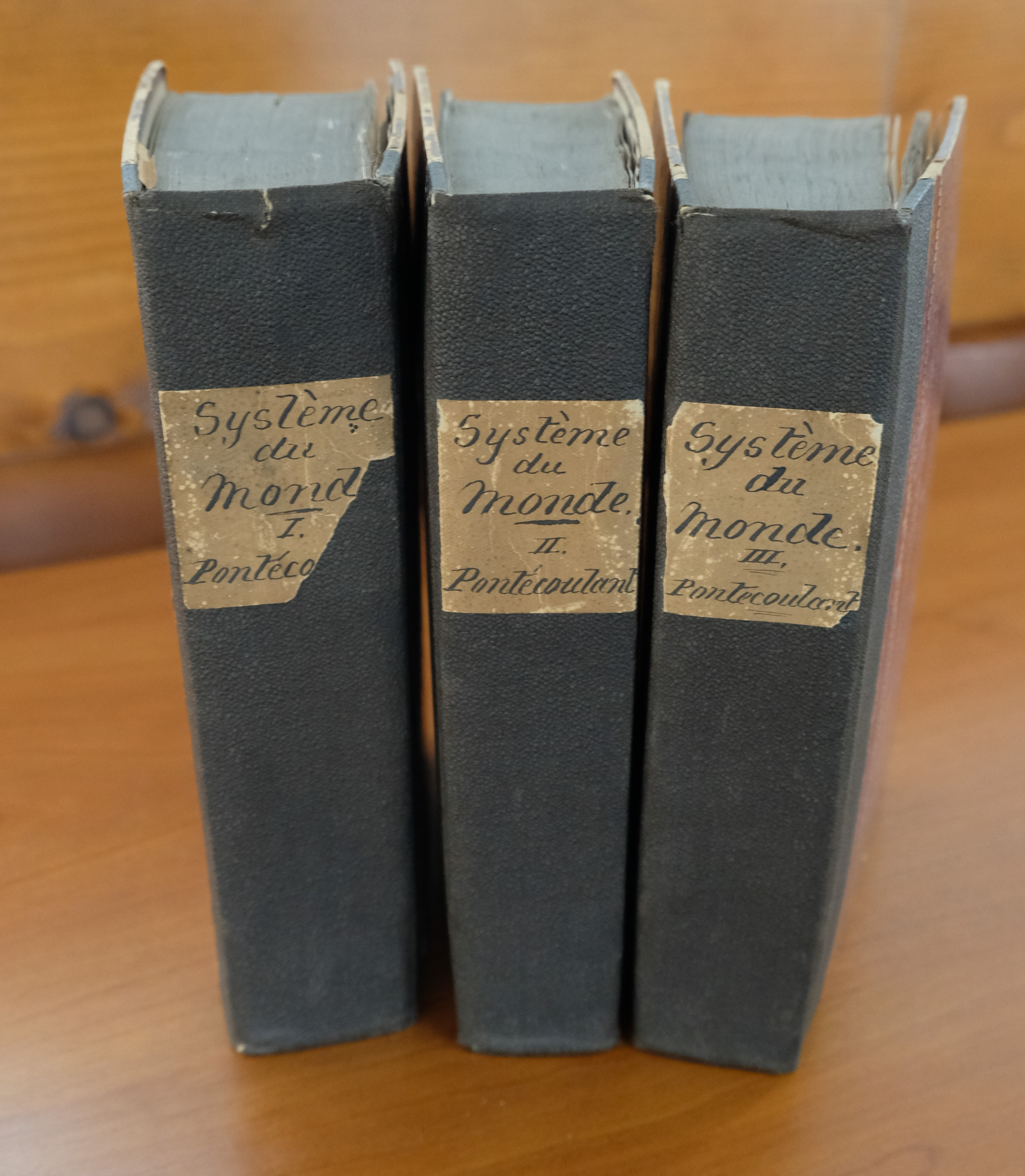
Volumes I-III of Theorie analytique du systeme du monde (1829-1834)

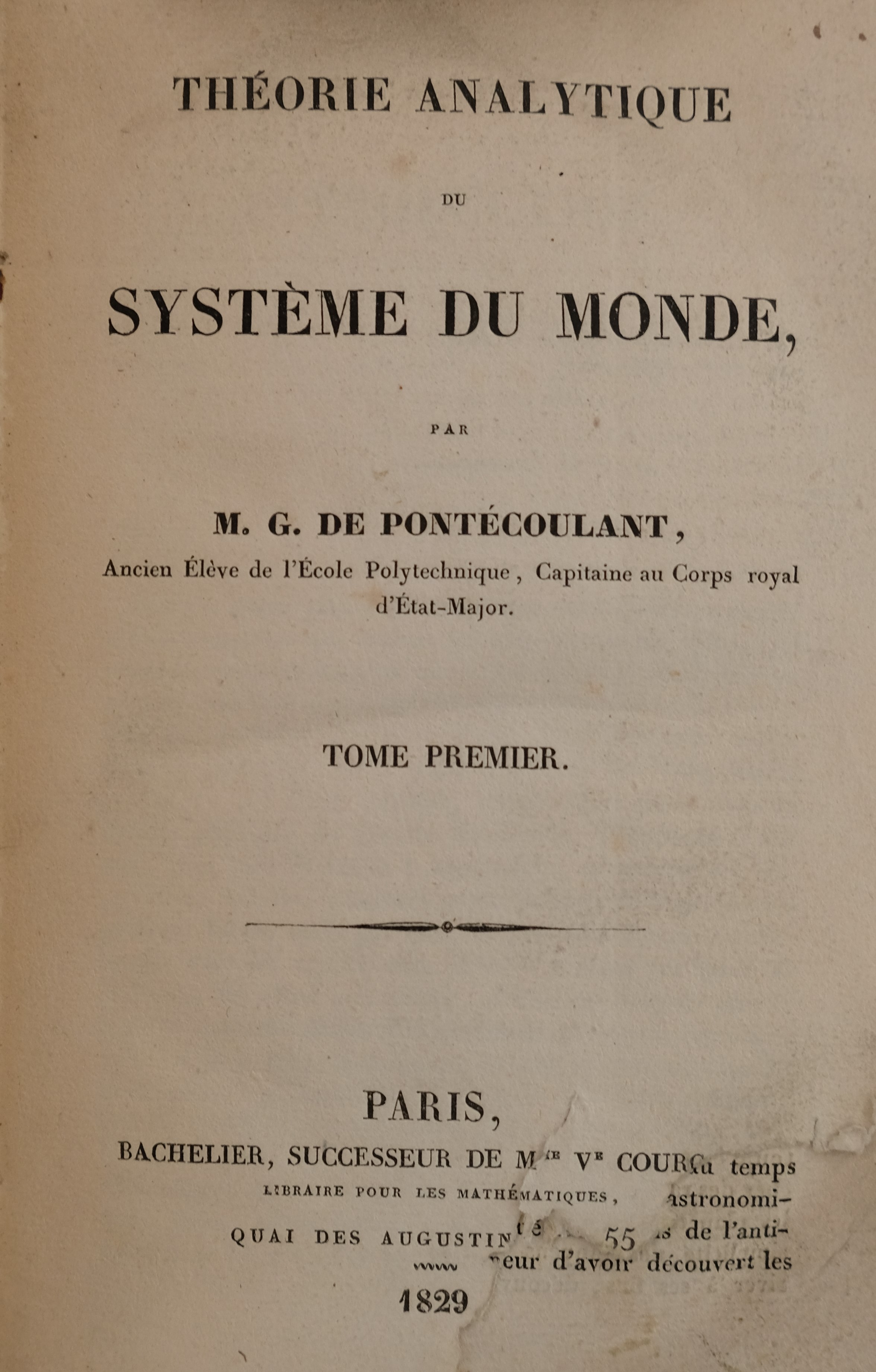
Title page to volume I of Theorie analytique du systeme du monde (1829)

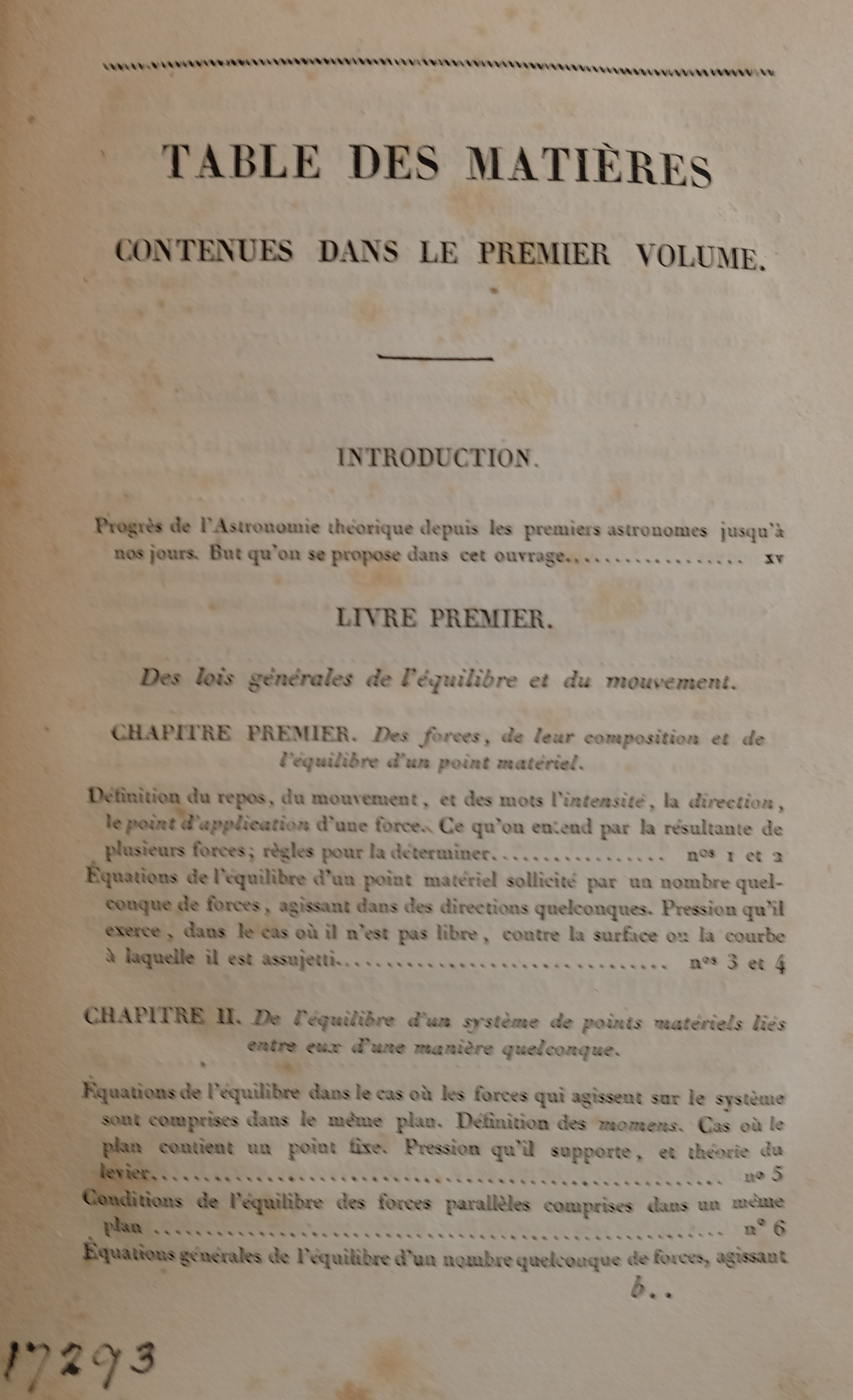
Table of contents to volume I of Theorie analytique du systeme du monde (1829)

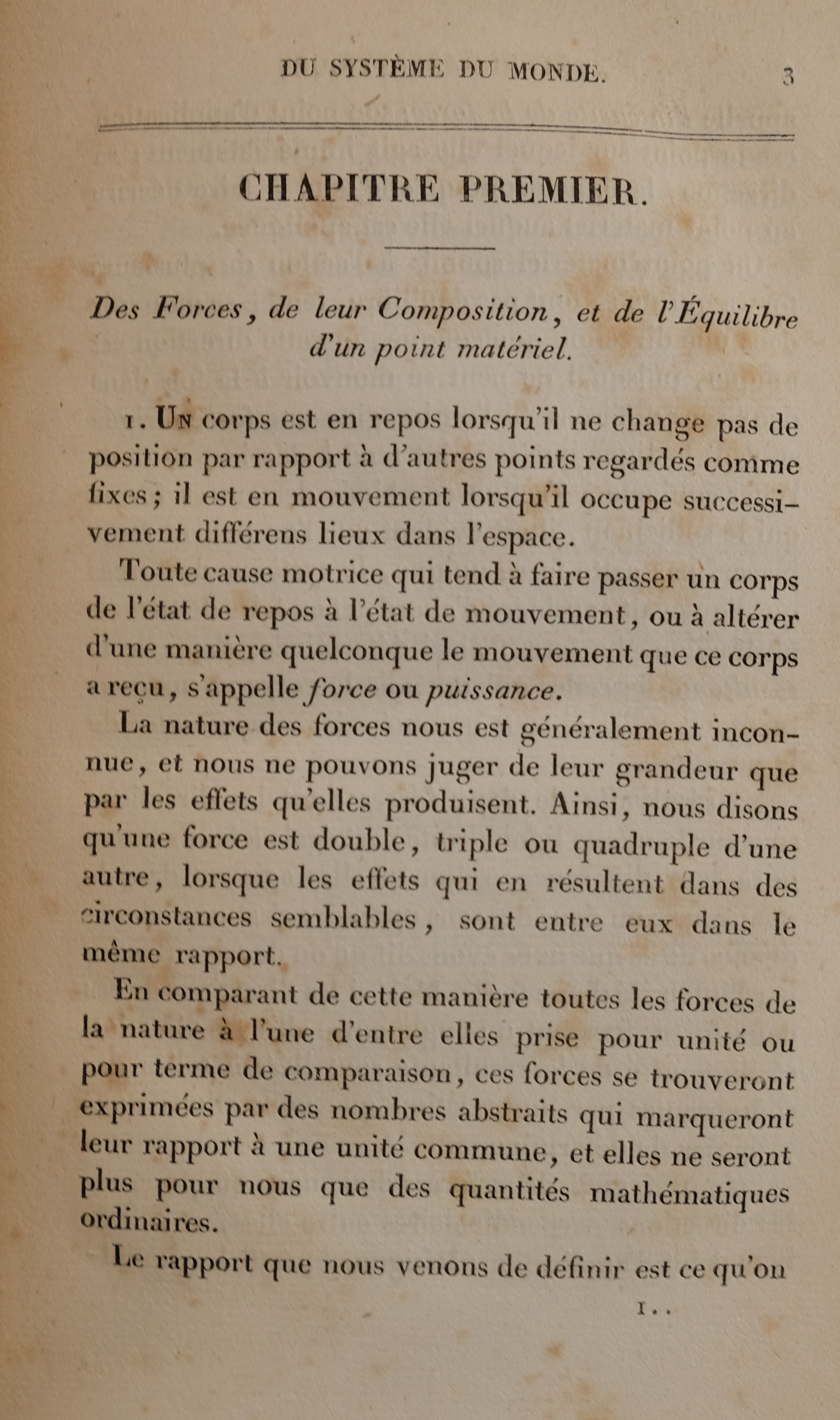
First page to volume I of Theorie analytique du systeme du monde (1829)

== Bibliography ==
- 1829-1846, "Théorie Analytique du Système du Monde", Paris.
- 1840, "Traité élémentaire de Physique Céleste", Paris, 2 volumes.
- 1864, "Notice sur la comète de Halley et ses apparitions successives de 1531 à 1910", Comptes rendus hebdomadaires des séances de l’Académie des sciences, 58, 706-709
