= Battle of Villers-Bocage =

1944 battle in occupied France

- Part of Operation Perch
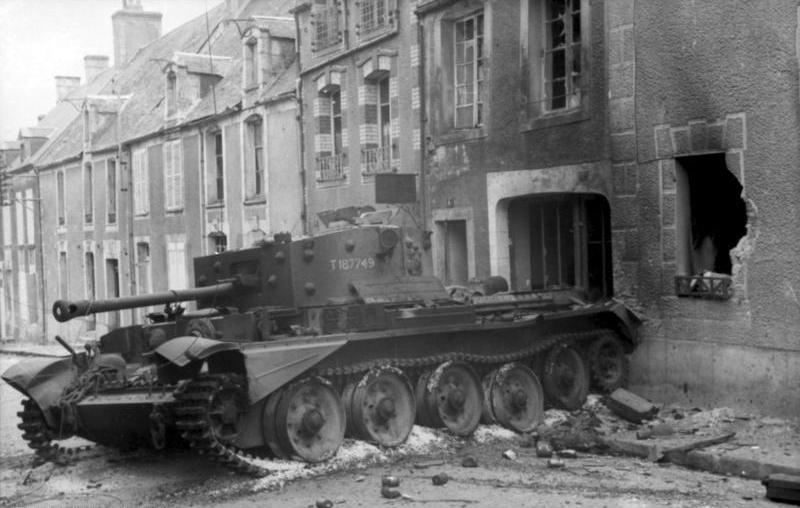
- A Cromwell observation post tank on Villers-Bocage's main street commanded by Captain Paddy Victory, 5th Royal Horse Artillery; one of more than twelve vehicles attacked by Michael Wittmann.
Date	13 June 1944
Location	Villers-Bocage, France 49°4′50″N 0°39′22″W
Result	See Aftermath section

Belligerents
United Kingdom	Germany

Commanders and leaders
George Erskine; William Hinde	Fritz Bayerlein; Heinz von Westernhagen; Michael Wittmann

Strength
One brigade group c. 60 tanks	Two ad-hoc battle groups part of a heavy tank battalion 31–41 tanks

Casualties and losses
~217 casualties 23–27 tanks	8–15 tanks written off, others damaged
- Several civilians

The Battle of Villers-Bocage took place during the Second World War on 13 June 1944, one week after the Normandy landings, which had begun the Western Allies' conquest of German-occupied France. The battle was the result of a British attempt to exploit a gap in the German defences west of the city of Caen. After one day of fighting in and around the small town of Villers-Bocage and a second day defending a position outside the town, the British force retreated.

The Allies and the Germans regarded control of Caen as vital to the Normandy campaign. In the days following the D-Day landings on 6 June, the Germans rapidly dug in north of the city. On 9 June, a two-pronged British attempt to surround and capture Caen was defeated. On the right flank of the British Second Army, the 1st US Infantry Division had forced back the German 352nd Infantry Division and opened a gap in the German front. To bypass the German Panzer-Lehr Division blocking the direct route south in the area of Tilly-sur-Seulles, a mixed force of tanks, infantry and artillery, based on the 22nd Armoured Brigade (Brigadier William "Loony" Hinde) of the 7th Armoured Division, advanced through the gap in a flanking manoeuvre towards Villers-Bocage. British commanders hoped that the appearance of a strong force in their rear would surround the Panzer-Lehr Division or force it to withdraw.

The 22nd Armoured Brigade group reached Villers-Bocage without serious incident on the morning of 13 June. The leading elements advanced eastwards from the town on the Caen road to a ridge at Point 213, where they were ambushed by Tiger I tanks of the 101st SS Heavy Panzer Battalion. In a few minutes, tanks, anti-tank guns and transport vehicles were destroyed, many by SS-Obersturmführer Michael Wittmann. The Germans attacked the town and were repulsed, losing several Tigers and Panzer IVs. After six hours, Hinde ordered a withdrawal to a more defensible position on a knoll west of Villers-Bocage. The next day, the Germans attacked the brigade box, arranged for all-round defence, in the Battle of the Island. The British inflicted a costly repulse on the Germans and then retired from the salient. The Battle for Caen continued east of Villers-Bocage, the ruins of which were captured on 4 August, after two raids by strategic bombers of RAF Bomber Command.

The British conduct of the Battle of Villers-Bocage has been controversial, because their withdrawal marked the end of the post–D-Day "scramble for ground" and the start of an attritional battle for Caen. Some historians have written that the British attack was a failure caused by a lack of conviction among some senior commanders, rather than the fighting power of the German army, while others judge the British force to have been insufficient for the task. The "single-handed" attack by Wittmann early on has excited imaginations, to the extent that some historians and writers conclude that it has dominated the historical record to an unwarranted degree and that while "remarkable", his role has been exaggerated.

== Background ==
=== D-Day and Operation Perch ===
Allied and Axis dispositions on 12 June 1944, showing the British flanking attack through the Caumont Gap and the supporting US 1st Infantry Division advance

The British 3rd Infantry Division of I Corps, came ashore on Sword Beach on 6 June 1944, with Caen—9 mi (14 km) inland—as their final objective. The vicinity of Caen was attractive to Allied planners because it contained airfields and was open, dry and conducive to swift offensive operations, for which the Allies had the advantage of numerical superiority in tanks and mobile units. The attempt to capture Caen on D-Day was ambitious but traffic jams on the beaches delayed the 27th Armoured Brigade. The advance of the 3rd Infantry Division diminished as it fought past German fortifications and was stopped short of Caen before dark, by elements of the 21st Panzer Division.

The next day, the British began Operation Perch, an advance to the south-east of Caen, according to a contingency in the invasion plan. I Corps continued the attack towards Caen but the Germans were able to reinforce the defenders, which made it impossible to rush the city with small numbers of men and tanks. On 9 June, the Allied ground forces commander, General Bernard Montgomery, revised Operation Perch to be a bigger attack with a pincer movement to surround the city. After delays caused by the time taken to get the attacking forces into position, simultaneous attacks began west and east of Caen on 12 June. On the east side of the Orne River, in the airborne bridgehead, two brigades of the 51st (Highland) Infantry Division were held up by the 21st Panzer Division and on 13 June the attack was called off. To the west of Caen, XXX Corps was unable to advance south of the village of Tilly-sur-Seulles against the Panzer-Lehr Division, one of the most powerful armoured formations in the German army, which had recently arrived in Normandy. (Note: The division contained 237 tanks and assault guns and double the number of half-tracked vehicles, compared to other panzer divisions.)

=== Caumont Gap ===
During the night of 9/10 June, the German 352nd Infantry Division retired towards Saint-Lô, creating a wide gap in the German lines covered only by light forces. On 12 June the British 7th Armoured Division passed through the gap heading for Villers-Bocage and the ridge beyond, while the US 1st and 2nd Infantry Divisions launched their own attacks in support.

The envelopment of Caen had been prevented by the Germans on the right flank of XXX Corps, at the junction between the British Second Army (Lieutenant-General Miles Dempsey) and the First US Army; five German Kampfgruppen (battle groups), including the last reserves of LXXXIV Korps, had been destroyed, leaving only the remnants of the 352nd Infantry Division defending the front from Trévières to Agy. American attacks caused the left flank of the division to collapse and on the night of 9/10 June the division retreated to Saint-Lô, leaving a 7.5 mi (12.1 km)-gap between the Panzer-Lehr Division and the German troops near Caumont-l'Éventé, with only the 17th SS-Panzergrenadier Division reconnaissance battalion in the area. The Germans intended to fill the gap with the 2nd Panzer Division, but on 10 June the bulk of it was still between Amiens and Alençon and not expected to arrive in strength until 13 June. (Note: Reynolds wrote that the 3rd Fallschirmjäger Division was sent to cover the gap but Harrison wrote that the II Fallschirmjäger Korps was diverted to Carentan further west.) Although reluctant to commit the 2nd Panzer Division piecemeal, General der Panzertruppe Hans Freiherr von Funck, commander of the XLVII Panzer Korps, rushed the divisional reconnaissance battalion to Caumont to hold the high ground.

Dempsey ordered the XXX Corps commander, Lieutenant-General Gerard Bucknall and the 7th Armoured Division commander, Major-General George Erskine, to disengage the 7th Armoured Division from Tilly-sur-Seulles, move through the gap, seize Villers-Bocage and menace the exposed left flank of the Panzer-Lehr Division. The British objective was a ridge 1.6 mi (2.6 km) to the east of Villers-Bocage. Dempsey hoped that its capture would force the Panzer-Lehr Division to withdraw or risk being surrounded. The 50th (Northumbrian) Infantry Division and most of the infantry brigade of the 7th Armoured Division were to continue the attack against the Panzer-Lehr Division around Tilly-sur-Seulles; the 1st US Infantry Division and 2nd US Infantry Division of the V US Corps would continue their advance.

The 7th Armoured Division spent the morning of 12 June attacking towards Tilly-sur-Seulles according to its original orders; at 12:00 Erskine ordered Hinde to move the 22nd Armoured Brigade immediately through the gap. Soon afterwards, the 8th King's Royal Irish Hussars, the divisional reconnaissance regiment, began to reconnoitre a route for the brigade and the rest of the division left Trungy at around 16:00. Four hours later the main body was close to Livry after a 12 mi (19 km) unopposed advance, the last 6 mi (9.7 km) of which was through German-held territory. The leading Cromwell tank of the 8th Hussars was destroyed by an anti-tank gun of the Panzer-Lehr Division Escort Company, which held out for two hours. Taylor wrote that the lead tank was destroyed and Forty wrote that a leading tank was lost. Hoping to mislead the Germans about the objective, on reaching the vicinity of la Mulotiere, north of Livry, Hinde ordered a halt for the night. The 8th King's Royal Irish and 11th (Prince Albert's Own) Hussars, the XXX Corps armoured car regiment, reconnoitred the flanks. The 11th Hussars encountered no resistance on the right flank and gained touch with the 1st US Infantry Division near Caumont. (Note: As they advanced, the 1st US Infantry Division found the town occupied by two companies of the reconnaissance battalion of the 2nd Panzer Division; part of the town was captured on 12 June and the remainder the following day.) On the left flank, 3 Troop, A Squadron, 8th Hussars, located elements of the Panzer-Lehr Division less than 2 mi (3.2 km) away. The two leading tanks were knocked out by an anti-tank gun and the Troop leader, Lieutenant H. Talbot Harvey, was killed along with six other members of his troop.

== Plan ==
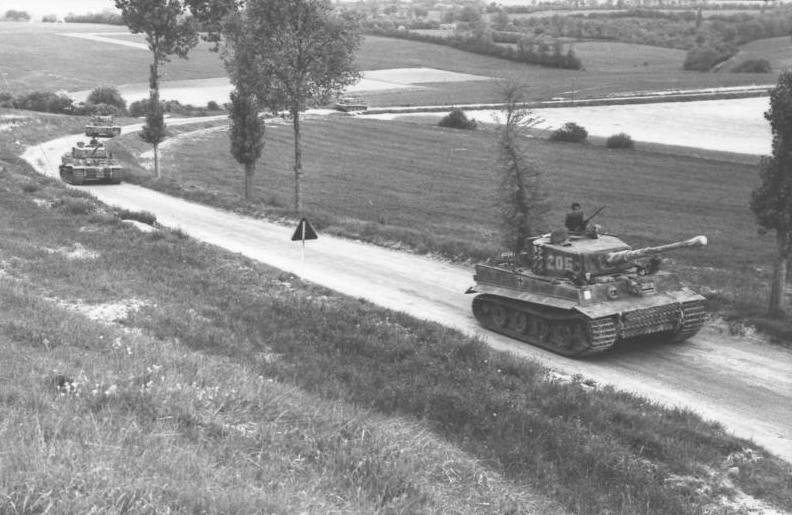
Wittmann's company, 7 June 1944, on Route nationale 316, en route to Morgny. Wittmann is standing in the turret of Tiger 205.

It was clear that to control Villers-Bocage, the British would have to occupy the ridge rapidly. The 4th County of London Yeomanry (Sharpshooters) (4th CLY), with a company of the 1st Battalion Rifle Brigade, was to pass through Villers-Bocage and occupy the highest point of the ridge at Point 213. The 1/7th Queen's Royal Regiment (West Surrey) would follow up and occupy the town; the 5th Royal Tank Regiment (5th RTR) and a company of the Rifle Brigade were to take high ground at Maisoncelles-Pelvey to the south-west of Villers-Bocage. The 260th Anti-tank Battery of the Norfolk Yeomanry would cover the gap between the 4th CLY and the 5th RTR with 17pdr SP Achilles self-propelled anti-tank guns. The 5th Regiment, Royal Horse Artillery (5th RHA), would follow the rest of the brigade group with its Sexton self-propelled guns. The 5th RHA and the brigade group tactical headquarters were established at Amayé-sur-Seulles. The two Hussar regiments were to provide flank protection against the Panzer-Lehr Division and uncover German positions on either side of the line of advance. The 131st Infantry Brigade, with the 1st Royal Tank Regiment (1st RTR) and the 1/5th and 1/6th Queen's, was to hold Livry as a firm base.

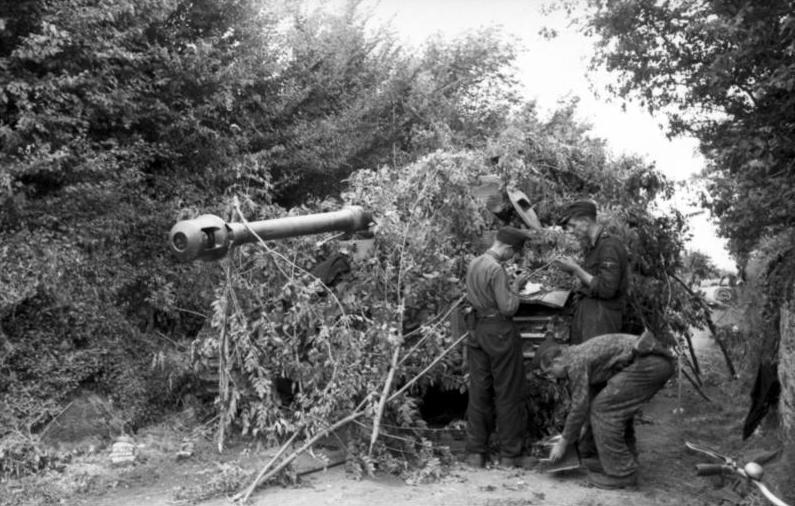
Probably taken on 14 June this photo shows a camouflaged Tiger tank on the Ancienne Route de Caen (Old Caen Road), where Wittmann's company spent the night of 12/13 June.

The I SS-Panzer Korps commander Obergruppenführer Sepp Dietrich ordered his only reserve, 101st SS Heavy Panzer Battalion, to move behind the Panzer-Lehr and 12th SS-Panzer divisions in the Villers-Bocage area, as a precaution against an attempt to advance into the Caumont Gap. The 101st SS Heavy Panzer Battalion had arrived in Normandy on 12 June, after a five-day drive from Beauvais. The battalion had an establishment of 45 Tiger I, but only about 17 tanks had reached the front by 13 June due to mechanical breakdowns during the drive from Beavais. Some of the support vehicles had also been damaged in an air attack near Versailles. The 1st Company moved to a position 5.6 mi (9.0 km) north-east of Villers-Bocage, the 2nd Company to just south of Point 213 on the Villers-Bocage ridge and the 3rd trailed near Falaise. The 2nd Company had fourteen tanks, but because of their mechanical unreliability, only six Tigers were present on 13 June. (Note: I. Zug (1st platoon) made up of Tigers 211 (SS-Obersturmführer Jürgen Wessel), 212 (SS-Unterscharführer Balthasar Woll), 213 (SS-Hauptscharführer Hans Höflinger) and 214 (SS-Unterscharführer Karl-Heinz Warmbrunn); II. Zug (2nd platoon) made up of Tigers 221 (SS-Untersturmführer Georg Hantusch), 222 (SS-Unterscharführer Kurt Sowa), 223 (SS-OberscharführerJürgen Brandt) and 224 (SS-Unterscharführer Ewald Mölly); and III. Zug (3rd platoon) made up of Tigers 231 (SS-Standartenoberjunker Heinz Belbe), 232 (SS-Unterscharführer Kurt Kleber) 233 (SS-Oberscharführer Georg Lötsch) and 234 (SS-Unterscharführer Herbert Stief).) The area around Villers-Bocage came under heavy naval artillery fire during the night of 12/13 June and the 2nd Company moved three times; the company planned a mechanical overhaul for the morning.

== Battle ==
=== Advance ===
Topography of the area west of Caen

During the early hours of 13 June, the 1st Rifle Brigade reconnoitred the first 0.5 mi (800 m) of the route. Livry was reported to be clear of Germans and the advance resumed at 05:30 with the 4th CLY leading the way. The column was met by jubilant French civilians, leading to a relaxed mood among the soldiers. Erroneous information was passed to the British that German tanks were stranded in Tracy-Bocage and rumours held that other tanks were similarly stranded at the Château de Villers-Bocage. On 11 June, German medical personnel had established a hospital at the château but had left at dawn on 13 June; a few German troops remained about the town.

As the column approached Villers-Bocage, the crew of an Sd.Kfz. 231 armoured car watched the British advance and escaped. At 08:30, having covered 5 mi (8.0 km), the 22nd Armoured Brigade group entered the town to be greeted by celebrating residents; two German soldiers were spotted leaving at high speed in a Volkswagen Kübelwagen. The two Hussar regiments made contact with German forces on either side of the 22nd Brigade group route and the 8th Hussars engaged Schwerer Panzerspähwagen (eight-wheeler armoured cars). The Hussars reported German tanks heading towards Villers-Bocage but Lieutenant Charles Pearce, of 4th CLY, thought that these were probably self-propelled guns.

=== Morning ===
With Villers-Bocage occupied, A Squadron 4th CLY motored ahead to Point 213, without reconnaissance, as ordered. A Kübelwagen was destroyed and the tanks moved into hull down positions to establish a defensive perimeter. Along the road between the town and the ridge, the personnel carriers of the Rifle Brigade pulled over nose-to-tail, to allow reinforcements for Point 213 to pass. The riflemen dismounted and posted sentries but could see fewer than 250 yd (230 m) to either side of the road.

Major Wright, the commanding officer of the 1st Rifle Brigade, called a conference at Point 213 for all officers and the senior NCOs of A Company. It was realised that a shell could kill the company commanders and the half-track occupants were rapidly dispersed among several other vehicles. In Villers-Bocage, Lieutenant-Colonel Arthur, Viscount Cranley, commander of the 4th CLY, expressed concern that his men were "out on a limb" but was assured by Hinde that all was well and was ordered to Point 213, to ensure his men had taken up good defensive positions. Hinde then left Villers-Bocage for his headquarters.

South of Point 213 Wittmann, the commander of the 2nd Company, 101st SS Heavy Panzer Battalion, was surprised by the British advance through Villers-Bocage,

I had no time to assemble my company; instead I had to act quickly, as I had to assume that the enemy had already spotted me and would destroy me where I stood. I set off with one tank and passed the order to the others not to retreat a single step but to hold their ground.

"For Christ's sake get a move on! There's a Tiger running alongside us fifty yards away!"

— Sergeant O'Connor, 1st Platoon, A Company, 1st Rifle Brigade.

Wittmann's Tiger was spotted at about 09:00 by Sergeant O'Connor of the Rifle Brigade, who was travelling towards Point 213 in a half-track and broke radio silence to give the only warning the British force received. The Tiger emerged from cover onto Route Nationale 175 and knocked out a Cromwell, the rearmost tank at Point 213. A Sherman Firefly was then knocked out, caught fire and blocked the road. (Note: knocked out means, being immobilised to being made defenceless against destruction.) The British at Point 213 were then engaged by the rest of the 2nd Company and lost three more tanks.

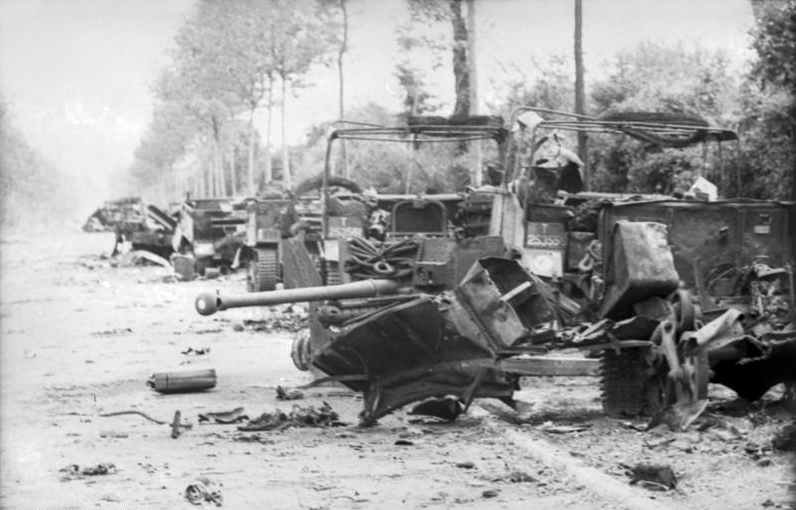
The wreckage of the 1st Rifle Brigade transport column and a 6-pounder anti-tank gun, on the road between Villers-Bocage and Point 213

Wittmann drove on towards Villers-Bocage. Along the road, the Rifle Brigade troops attempted to reply with PIAT anti-tank weapons and a 6-pounder anti-tank gun; as the Tiger drew closer, panic set in and the riflemen looked for cover. The brigade vehicles were set on fire by machine guns and high-explosive shells but few casualties were suffered. (Note: Some accounts report that the transport was engaged by two Tigers. It is speculated that the second German tank was positioned north of the main road, near the road junction to Tilly-sur-Seulles and was possibly out of fuel. Marie wrote that this is why an anti-tank gun at the back of the column was aimed towards the road junction.) At the east end of Villers-Bocage, Wittmann engaged and knocked out three M3 Stuart light tanks of the 4th CLY Reconnaissance Troop. (Note: Taylor wrote that the third light tank "may not have been taken precisely where I originally thought". Allen wrote that the third Stuart tank was knocked out elsewhere.)

In the town, the tanks of the 4th CLY Regimental Headquarters tried to escape but their reverse speed was "painfully slow"; one tank fired two shots before being destroyed by the Tiger. Two tanks reversed off the road into gardens, the 4th CLY Adjutant, Captain Pat Dyas, parked behind a barn; the Tiger drove past a wrecked Stuart towards the centre of town, knocking out another tank and missing Dyas. Lieutenant Charles Pearce took his scout car and warned the rest of the reconnaissance troop in the town centre and Pearce continued westwards to alert B Squadron of the 4th CLY. Wittmann knocked out another Cromwell and on the main street destroyed two artillery observation post (OP) tanks of the 5th RHA, the intelligence officer's scout car and the medical officer's half-track. (Note: The Sherman OP tank was equipped with a dummy main gun made of wood, to make room for a map table and radio equipment.)

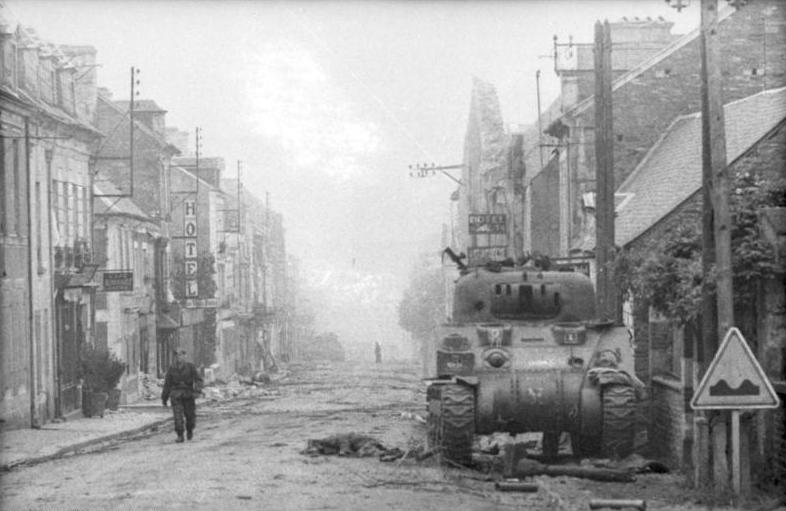
Major Well's Sherman OP tank, on the main street in Villers-Bocage

Forty and Taylor wrote that Wittmann was engaged by a Sherman Firefly and withdrew after collapsing a house that contained a German sniper. Bob Moore wrote that he forced Wittmann to retire when a shot from his tank dented the driver visor of the Tiger. Wittmann's withdrawal brought him close to Dyas who, having been bypassed, had been stalking the Tiger to fire at its thinner rear armour. The Cromwell shells had no effect and Wittmann destroyed the British tank. Pearce wrote that Wittmann engaged the Cromwell with the Tiger turret reversed. Dyas escaped the tank and was shot at by German infantry in houses along the street. Wittmann drove east to the outskirts of Villers-Bocage and was disabled by a 6-pounder anti-tank gun at the Tilly-sur-Seulles road junction. (Note: A radio report logged at XXX Corps at 09:45, claimed a Tiger knocked out by an anti-tank gun to the east of the town. In the Rifle Brigade's regimental history, Sergeant Bray is credited with knocking out a Tiger. Hastings omitted this, crediting Bray with the destruction of two half-tracks and an armoured car.) Wittmann wrote that his tank was disabled by an anti-tank gun in the town centre. In less than 15 minutes, 13 to 14 tanks, two anti-tank guns and 13 to 15 transport vehicles had been destroyed by the 2nd Company, 101st SS Heavy Panzer Battalion, many by Wittmann. Wittmann and his crew made their way to the Panzer-Lehr Division headquarters at Cháteau d'Orbois, 3.7 mi (6.0 km) north of Villers-Bocage.

=== Point 213 ===
Major Werncke of the Panzer-Lehr Division conducted a reconnaissance of Point 213 later in the morning and reconnoitring on foot, discovered a column of unoccupied Cromwell tanks. The tank crews were studying a map with an officer at the front of the column, and Werncke drove one off before the British could react. At the east end of Villers-Bocage, he found a scene of "burning tanks and Bren-gun carriers and dead Tommies" and drove back to the Panzer-Lehr headquarters at Château d'Orbois. After the ambush on Point 213, A Squadron, 4th CLY had nine tanks operational, including two Fireflies and a Cromwell OP tank, although some were short of crew. There was one rifle section and an equal number of officers. It was decided to hold the position on the ridge until reinforcements arrived and an all round defence was organised. At around 10:00, support and reconnaissance troops of the 4th Company, 101st SS Heavy Panzer Battalion arrived and began to collect prisoners between the ridge and the town. Some of the British escaped, and about thirty got back to the British lines.

The 1/7th Queen's took up defensive positions in Villers-Bocage and captured an advance party of three men from the 2nd Panzer Division. A relief force was prepared to rescue the troops on the ridge, but this plan was rejected by Cranley. At about 10:30, Cranley reported that the position on Point 213 was becoming untenable and withdrawal was impossible. A break-out attempt was planned, and two hours later a Cromwell crew tried to get back to Villers-Bocage by a roundabout route but was knocked out by German tank fire. The Germans shelled the trees along the road, spraying shell and wood splinters, and after five minutes the troops on the ridge surrendered. The British tried to burn their tanks, but German soldiers arrived quickly and took thirty of the CLY prisoner, along with some riflemen and troops of the Royal Horse Artillery. A few men escaped; Captain Christopher Milner of the Rifle Brigade spent the rest of the day on the run and crossed back into the British lines after dark.

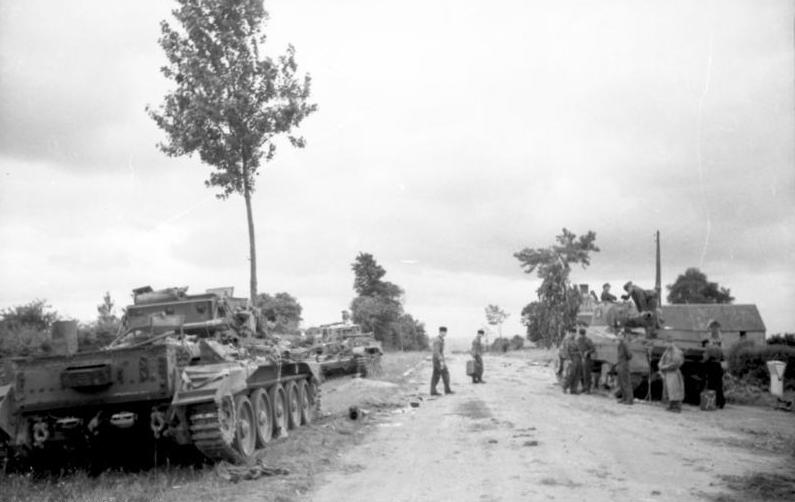
Destroyed British tanks on Point 213 after the German arrival, with two Cromwells on the left and a Sherman Firefly on the right

Wittmann briefed the Panzer-Lehr Division intelligence officer and was given a Schwimmwagen to return to Point 213. (Note: D'Este wrote that after engaging the Firefly from B Squadron, Wittmann withdrew from the town "into the woods south-east of Villers-Bocage" and "returned to his unit to re-arm and re-fuel" before renewing the attack on Point 213, preparatory to a second attack on Villers-Bocage. Beevor wrote that Wittmann attacked elements of B Squadron, who were incapable of replying, before turning around and returning to Point 213, to "finish the battle with A Squadron". Wittmann wrote that his tank was disabled in the town and he immediately went to the headquarters of the Panzer-Lehr Division. Dietrich wrote that Wittmann left the town on foot during the morning and returned to Point 213 by car. Beevor, Hastings and Dietrich wrote that Wittmann was involved in the afternoon counter-attack on Villers-Bocage; Beevor wrote that he joined the 2nd Panzer Division and Dietrich wrote that he directed the 1st Company, schwere SS-Panzer Abteilung 101. Forty wrote "[why] would a competent, experienced SS captain like Möbius [the commanding officer of the 1st Company] defer to an officer of lower rank, however expert and let him lead the attack?" The claim that tanks from the 2nd Panzer took part in the battle was rejected by Reynolds, who wrote that their tanks were "nowhere near Villers-Bocage at the time". Taylor wrote that Obersturmfuher Hannes Philipsen from the 1st Company led the attack into Villers-Bocage, and that after briefing Möbius, Wittmann was "whisked away to report to ... Sepp Dietrich ... and a number of eager journalists". "It was they who made the most of the story.") Kauffmann ordered Hauptmann Helmut Ritgen to block the northern exits of the town with 15 Panzer IV, mainly from 6th Company, 2nd Battalion Panzer-Lehr Regiment 130 and ten from a workshop south of Route Nationale 175. Ritgen rendezvoused with the Panzer-Lehr Division commanding officer, Generalleutnant Fritz Bayerlein, at Villy-Bocage. As Ritgen's tanks moved towards Villers-Bocage they ran into a British anti-tank gun screen and lost a tank. Four Panzer IVs entered the town from the south and the first two tanks were knocked out; the others withdrew.

In Villers-Bocage, A Company of the 1/7th Queen's secured the area around the railway station and B and C companies occupied the east side of the town. German infantry had entered the town and house-to-house fighting began. Two German tanks were damaged and driven off, but the 1/7th Queen's infantry companies became mingled and were ordered to fall back to reorganise. A Company was ordered back to the railway station, C Company was assigned the north-eastern edge of the town and D Company the south-eastern edge. B Company was placed in reserve and the battalion anti-tank guns were distributed along the front line. At the town square an ambush was laid by the 4th CLY. A Sherman Firefly, several Cromwells, a 6-pounder anti-tank gun and infantry of the 1/7th Queen's with PIATs waited for German tanks to move down the main street. To the west of the town, the Germans attacked the 1/5th Queen's near Livry and lost a tank.

=== Afternoon ===
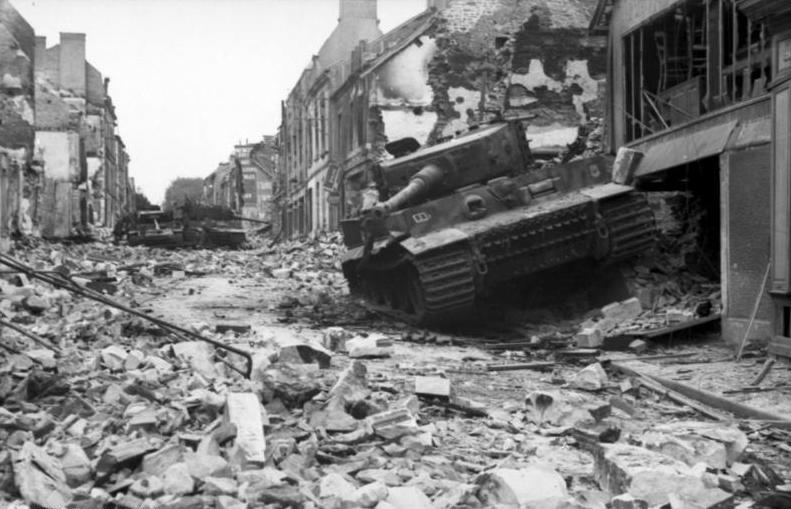
Knocked out German tanks on the main street of Villers-Bocage. Historian Henri Marie claims that the Tiger in the foreground was finished off by British infantry using grenades; none of the crew survived the attack. The devastation was only partially caused by the battle; at first light on 14 June RAF Hawker Typhoons attacked the town hours before this photograph was taken.

At around 13:00, tanks of the Panzer-Lehr Division advanced into Villers-Bocage unsupported by infantry. Four Panzer IVs tried to enter from the south near a wrecked Panzer IV and two were knocked out by anti-tank fire. Some Tigers were brought up and silenced the anti-tank position. Rolf Möbius, commander of the 1st Company, divided the primary counter-attack down the main highway through Villers-Bocage and through the southern section of town parallel to the main road, to secure the town centre. The Tigers advanced slowly to intimidate the British into withdrawing and ran into the British ambush. The Firefly opened fire on the lead tank and missed but the anti-tank gun knocked it out. A group of three Tigers split up and drove through the back streets to flank the British; one was engaged by an anti-tank gun and destroyed and the other two were engaged with PIATs, with one being knocked out and the other immobilised.

Artist's impression for the London Illustrated News of the Tiger being engaged though the corner window by Bramall's Sherman Firefly. The artist has drawn the Firefly as a Covenanter tank

A fifth Tiger halted on the main street short of the ambush site, apparently waiting for the British to emerge from cover. The Tiger was spotted through the windows of a corner building by the Firefly crew, who reversed to shoot through the windows. The Tiger was hit on the gun mantlet and raced past the side street. A Cromwell advanced onto the main street and fired into the rear of the Tiger, knocking it out and then reversed back into cover. The Firefly knocked out a Panzer IV and during a lull, the disabled tanks were set on fire with blankets and petrol. (Note: According to Marie this also included Wittmann's abandoned tank.) Outside the town, the 7th Armoured Division brigade group stretched back to Amayé-sur-Seulles and was attacked from the north and south. The attacks were repulsed and at Tracey-Bocage, the 11th Hussars overwhelmed a pocket of resistance.

Bill Cotton, sheltering under an umbrella, remonstrated with the French Fire Brigade for attempting to put out a fire in a disabled German Mk IV tank.

— Robert Moore.

Under a mortar and artillery bombardment, the Germans attacked A Company 1/7th Queen's in the town and a platoon was cut off and captured. Even with the whole of the Queen's battalion in the town, the German troops found their way inside. Two grenadier battalions of the 2nd Panzer Division attacked from the south, were engaged by B Squadron 4th CLY and suffered many casualties. Both sides called for artillery support and several British mortars and a carrier were destroyed. By 18:00 the Queen's battalion headquarters was threatened and Hinde decided to withdraw before dark made the town untenable. Behind a smoke screen and bombardment by the 5th RHA and V US Corps, the infantry retreated, covered by tanks of the 4th CLY. The Germans harassed the withdrawal with artillery fire and infantry from Tracy-Bocage attacked the British for 2½ hours as they fell back. Though costly to the Germans this continued until around 22:30.

=== 14 June ===
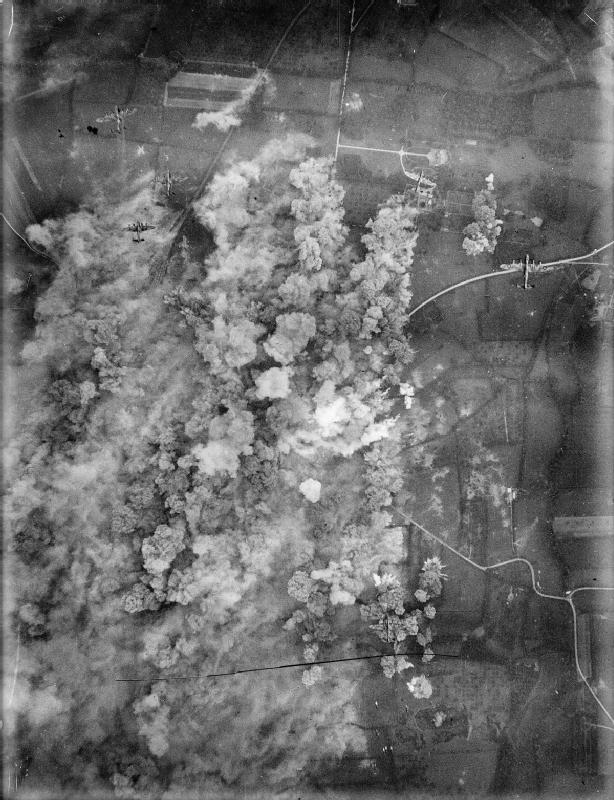
The town of Villers-Bocage, photographed during the bombing raid on 30 June 1944. Six Avro Lancasters are visible.

On 14 June, the 22nd Armoured Brigade group formed an all round defensive position, a "brigade box", in the Amayé-sur-Seulles–Tracy-Bocage–St-Germain area to overlook Villers-Bocage. (Note: D'Este wrote that the box was between Amayé-sur-Seulles and Tracy-Bocage, around Hill 174. Taylor wrote that the box was around the brigade tactical headquarters on Hill 174. Forty placed the box to the north of Tracy-Bocage, around the hamlet of St-Germain, from a report by the 22nd Armoured Brigade Group commanding officer, that the position was east of Amayé-sur-Seulles and included St-Germain.) Supported by the 1st Company, 101st SS Heavy Panzer Battalion, the Panzer-Lehr Division attacked the brigade box. The 1st US Infantry Division, on the heights around Caumont, opened observed artillery fire, which helped to defeat the first German attack. Later attacks got so close that the artillery could not fire without hitting British positions. A platoon was overrun, and a counter-attack with tanks and infantry then forced the Germans back. The Germans subjected the box to harassing fire and attacked from two sides later in the day with artillery and tanks, which broke into the box and came close to the brigade headquarters before being repulsed. Although confident that the brigade box could be held, the inability of the 50th (Northumbrian) Infantry Division to come up prompted the decision to recall the brigade group and straighten the front line.

== Aftermath ==
=== Analysis ===
==== Propaganda ====
Both sides tried to exploit the Villers-Bocage battle for propaganda. Having escaped from their knocked-out tank, Lieutenant John Cloudsley-Thompson and his crew of the 4th CLY spent much of the day in a basement in Villers-Bocage. After dark, Thompson and the crew were picked up by troops of the 50th (Northumbrian) Infantry Division. During debriefing, Cloudsley-Thompson said that he "never wished to see another tank as long as [he] lived" but the British press reported this as "The first thing the five tank men asked for was another tank". Because the British had lost contact with the forces on Point 213 and withdrawn from Villers-Bocage, they were ignorant of the losses on both sides. The German propaganda machine swiftly credited Wittmann, a household name in Germany, with all the British tanks destroyed at Villers-Bocage.

Wittmann recorded a radio message on the evening of 13 June, describing the battle and claiming that later counter-attacks had destroyed a British armoured regiment and an infantry battalion. Doctored images were produced; three joined-together photographs, published in the German armed forces magazine Signal, gave a false impression of the scale of destruction in the town. The propaganda campaign was given credence in Germany and abroad, leaving the British convinced that the Battle of Villers-Bocage had been a disaster when its results were less clear-cut. Schneider, an instructor at the German Bundeswehr tank school and a historian, wrote that the Waffen-SS did not have an "experienced tank arm", compared to the army panzer divisions. The Waffen-SS may have fought with distinction during the Battle of Kursk but could not match the army's success, hence Dietrich's attempts to manufacture a hero out of Wittmann.

==== Wittmann ====
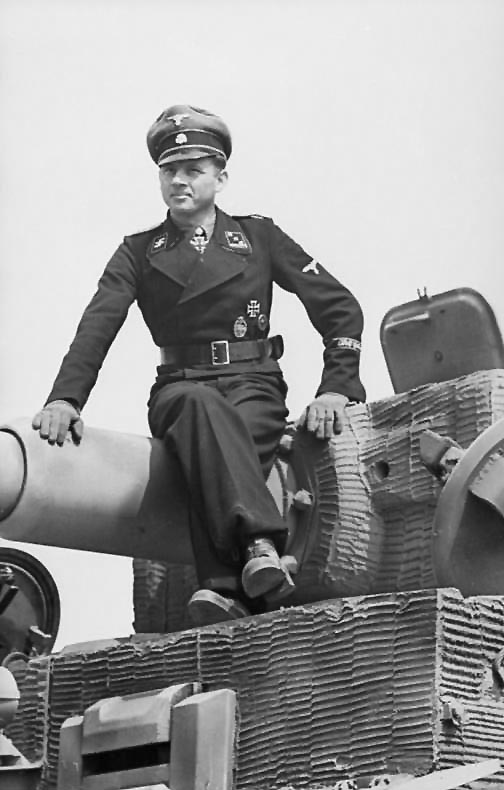
German tank commander Michael Wittman, photographed one month prior to Operation Overlord

In 2007, Stephen Badsey wrote that Wittmann's engagement of the spearhead of the 22nd Armoured Brigade group had overshadowed the period between D-Day and 13 June in historical accounts. Carlo D'Este wrote that Wittmann's attack was "one of the most amazing engagements in the history of armoured warfare", Max Hastings called it "one of the most devastating single-handed actions of the war" and Antony Beevor wrote that it was "one of the most devastating ambushes in British military history". Hubert Meyer attributed the failure of Operation Perch to Wittmann's "courage, his tactical and technical abilities and [...] the valor, the expertise and the camaraderie of his Panzer crew". Henri Marie called the attack a "spur of the moment" decision that showed Wittmann's quick grasp of the possibility of surprising the British but described the action as foolhardy and argued that other historians had been carried away by Wittmann's ambush; Wittmann lost the first Tiger knocked out in Normandy.

John Buckley attributed the hyperbole about Wittmann to the lingering influence of the German propaganda campaign and criticised D'Este and Meyer for exaggerating his role and implying that he single-handedly stopped the 7th Armoured Division. Buckley wrote that Russell A. Hart's claim that Wittmann "all but annihilated" the 7th Armoured Division spearhead was wrong and that "the complete German propaganda treatment" was available from Gary Simpson. Badsey called Wittmann's attack and the attention it has received, "remarkable but massively over-written". In 2013, Buckley wrote that unquestioning regurgitation of Nazi propaganda by writers and historians was inexcusably casual, when a glance at the facts showed that the defeat of the 7th Armoured Division by one Tiger crew led by Wittmann was a myth. Wittmann made a bold attack, which helped to stop the advance of the 4th CLY but did not make a solo effort; the action at Point 213 was led by Rolf Möbius.

==== Tactics ====
Beevor and Patrick Delaforce have written that the ambush would have been mitigated had it been detected sooner and blame "Erskine's failure to provide [a] reconnaissance screen" ahead of the British vanguard as it moved to Point 213. Marie wrote that the British vanguard out-paced the rest of the Brigade group, whose flanks were well protected and advanced with poor information and little intelligence gathering. Milner of the Rifle Brigade wrote that information was not gleaned from the town's inhabitants when it should have been and that had the battalion scout platoon been present, the result of the first engagement may have been different. (Note: The A Company scout platoon had not arrived in time for Operation Perch.) Milner also wrote that the first attack could have been repulsed had the battalion officers and NCOs been with their men instead of with the O-group on the ridge. Buckley wrote that while Wittmann showed great audacity, the causes of the British defeat were broader and that the British were to blame for the failure at Villers-Bocage, not superior German tanks. Hastings wrote that although the Tiger was "incomparably" more deadly than the Cromwell, the "shambles" caused by the Tigers reflected poorly on the tactics of the British force and that the

German achievement on 13/14 June had been that, while heavily outnumbered in the sector as a whole, they successfully kept the British everywhere feeling insecure and off-balance, while concentrating sufficient forces to dominate the decisive points. The British, in their turn, failed to bring sufficient forces to bear on these."

Marie noted that Dempsey was disappointed in the lack of tactical flair shown by Brigadier Hinde throughout the battle and that the British should have known better than to attempt an armoured advance unsupported by infantry in the bocage. The British fought an uncoordinated infantry and tank battle during the morning, and the Germans did much the same throughout the day.

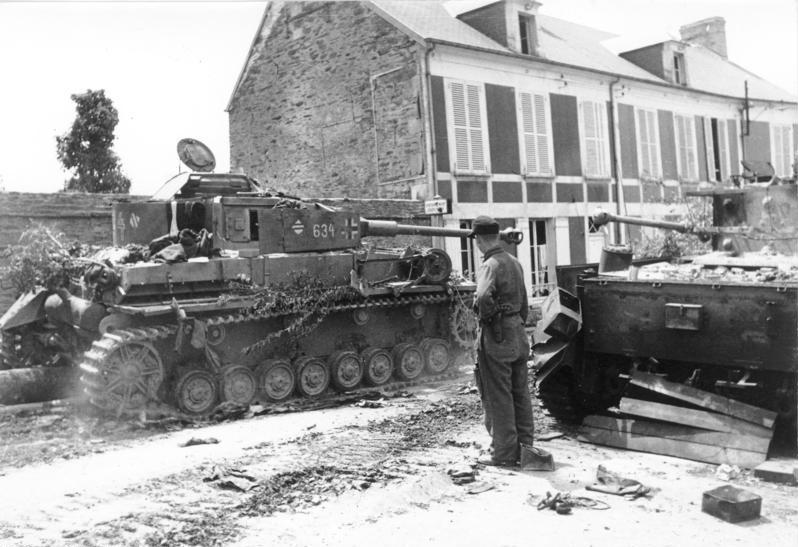
A knocked out Panzer IV in Villers-Bocage

Schneider described the contribution of the 101st SS Heavy Panzer Battalion to the battle as "everything but awe-inspiring". The Tiger companies and the Panzer-Lehr Division averted a serious British breakthrough but there was no need for the German counter-attack to have been piecemeal. Möbius and the 1st Company were in command of the road to Caen, so Wittmann had time to plan a coordinated attack. Schneider wrote that "a competent tank company commander does not accumulate so many serious mistakes". By putting the Tigers in a sunken lane overnight, with a vehicle with engine trouble at the head of the column, Wittmann risked blocking the company. Schneider called the advance by Wittmann into the town courageous but that it went "against all the rules". No intelligence was gathered beforehand and there was no "centre of gravity" or "concentration of forces" in the attack. "The bulk of the 2nd Company and Rolf Möbius' 1st Company, came up against an enemy who had gone onto the defensive".

Wittmann's "carefree" advance into British-occupied positions was "pure folly" and "such over hastiness was uncalled for". Had Wittmann properly prepared an assault involving the rest of his company and the 1st Company, there might have been greater results. "[T]houghtlessness of this kind was to cost [Wittmann] his life [in] August ... near Gaumesnil, during an attack casually launched in open country with an exposed flank". Meyer wrote that the 2nd Company advance into the town without infantry support was "obviously inexpedient". Marie called this a serious tactical error by Möbius but that it was a justifiable risk under the circumstances. No infantry were available and the British could have been expected to still be "under the devastating impression of seeing [their] vanguard totally destroyed in such a short time".

==== British withdrawal ====
The British official historian, Lionel Ellis, described the 22nd Armoured Brigade group withdrawal and explained that with the unexpected arrival of the 2nd Panzer Division, the 7th Armoured Division "could hardly have achieved full success". This view was partially supported by the briefing given to 7th Armoured Division commanders prior to the retreat but has gained little support. (Note: Hastings quoted Lieutenant-Colonel Goulburn on the reasons given for the withdrawal as "Firstly, 50 Div attack towards Longreves-Tilly [...] has made very little progress. Secondly, 2nd Panzer Division has been identified on our front.") In 1979, following the disclosure of Ultra, it was revealed that intercepted German communications placed the 2nd Panzer Division 35 mi (56 km) from the front line on 12 June. Ralph Bennett called Montgomery's claim that the division "suddenly appeared" disingenuous. Buckley wrote that the order to retreat was given before the 2nd Panzer Division arrived in any real strength, and Reynolds wrote that "2nd Panzer's tanks were nowhere near Villers-Bocage at this time". Ellis described the retirement as temporary, as the 7th Armoured Division was to be reinforced with the 33rd Armoured Brigade to renew the offensive towards Évrecy.

David French wrote that the follow-up formations landing in Normandy were on average two days behind schedule and that, had the 33rd Armoured Brigade, the 49th (West Riding) Infantry Division and the 7th Armoured Division's infantry brigade landed on time, XXX Corps might have been able to secure Villers-Bocage before the arrival of substantial German forces. Other historians wrote that substantial British forces remained uncommitted during the battle. Mungo Melvin wrote that although the 7th Armoured Division changed its organisation to a flexible combined arms structure, which was not done by the other British armoured divisions until after Operation Goodwood, neither the 131st Infantry Brigade nor the balanced divisional reserve of an armoured regiment and an infantry battalion were employed well.

Buckley referred to "a reduced armoured brigade, with only limited mobile infantry and artillery support", doubted it could worry the Germans and noted that the 151st Infantry Brigade was available in Corps reserve. Hastings was critical of a British failure to concentrate force at the crucial place and time and referred to the feelings of the "men on the spot" in Villers-Bocage that "a single extra infantry brigade could have been decisive in turning the scale". D'Este supported the claim by Bucknall, the XXX Corps commander, that neither the 151st Infantry Brigade or the 49th (West Riding) Infantry Division could be made ready in time to influence the battle.

==== Result ====
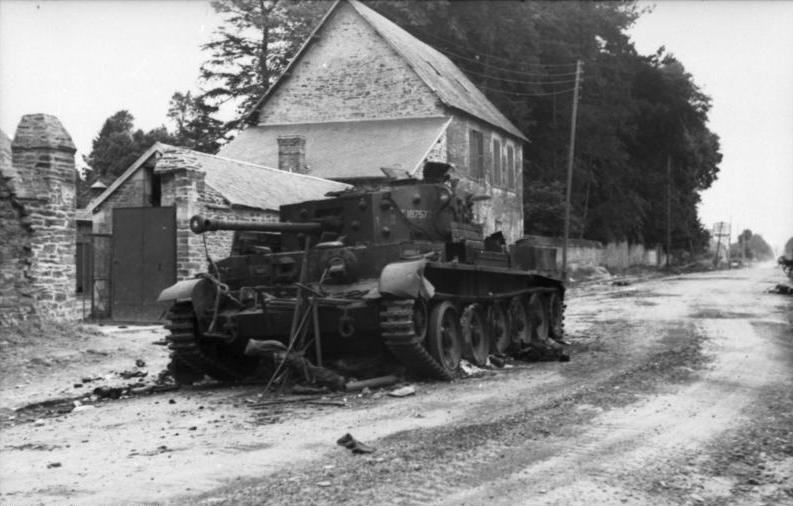
A knocked out Cromwell tank in Villers-Bocage

After the ambush by the 2nd Company, 101st SS Heavy Panzer Battalion and the loss of Point 213, the 22nd Armoured Brigade group had repulsed every German attack for two days,

Erskine's troops had suffered no defeat after the first costly encounters with the single Tiger.

— Wilmot

Students of the battle have looked to the senior commanders involved to explain the "fumbled failure" at Villers-Bocage. Dempsey remarked after the war that

.... this attack by 7th Armoured Division should have succeeded. My feeling that Bucknall and Erskine would have to go started with that failure ... the whole handling of that battle was a disgrace. Their decision to withdraw [from Villers-Bocage] was done by the corps commander and Erskine.

— Dempsey

D'Este called Dempsey "excessively harsh", saying that once the town had been abandoned the Brigade group, withdrawal was inevitable. Other historians suggest that Bucknall threw away the chance swiftly to capture Caen. Montgomery had been a patron of Bucknall and wrote that his protégé "could not manage a Corps once the battle became mobile". Buckley wrote that Bucknall was unprepared to support the attack once problems developed and that Erskine was not suited to the task. Wilmot agreed with Dempsey that Bucknall, not the Germans, was to blame for the 7th Armoured Division withdrawal. He further wrote that Bucknall refused to reinforce the division, because he had already decided that its lines of communication were endangered

This great opportunity of disrupting the enemy line and expanding the Allied bridgehead was lost not so much in the woods and orchards around Villers-Bocage, as in the Corps Commander's mind.

— Wilmot

D'Este wrote that the failure to unhinge the German front line south of Caen and outflank the I SS Panzer Corps was "one of the costliest Allied mistakes" of the campaign. With the British withdrawal, the chance of mounting a "snap airborne operation" to seize Caen or to deepen the Allied bridgehead had been lost. Wilmot wrote that after the battle, "Caen [could] be taken only by a set-piece assault". Hastings called Villers-Bocage a "debacle" and the moment which "marked, for the British, the end of the scramble for ground that had continued since D-Day". Reynolds wrote that the consequences of the battle would be felt in the coming weeks, during the costly attacks needed to drive the Germans from Caen and the surrounding area. The 7th Armoured Division history called the battle indecisive, "... the brilliant defensive battle of Villers Bocage ... although it obliged us to withdraw some seven miles, cost the enemy casualties disproportionate to this gain". This view is shared by Taylor, who wrote that the battle ended with no clear winner.

=== Casualties ===
Contradictory sources make casualty figures difficult to establish. The 22nd Armoured Brigade group suffered around 217 men killed, wounded and missing, many of whom were taken prisoner at Point 213. (Note: Hastings wrote that the Rifle Brigade A Company lost 80 men, of whom Taylor counted nine killed and the rest captured. D'Este wrote that the 4th CLY lost 85 men; four killed (Taylor gave 12 killed), five wounded and 76 missing. Delaforce wrote that the 1/7th QRR suffered 44 casualties, according to Taylor, seven of them killed. The Commonwealth War Graves Commission records two men killed from 5th RHA, one each for 1st RTR and 5th RTR and four from the 8th Hussars. No deaths are recorded for the 1/5th QRR or the 65th Anti-tank Regiment RA.) This figure includes five riflemen who had been captured but were then shot by their guards, apparently for attempting to escape, when they took cover spontaneously in a ditch under American artillery fire. The British lost 23 to 27 tanks, more than half of which were on Point 213, where A Squadron, 4th CLY, lost all 15 of its tanks. (Note: Taylor gave losses in the 22nd Armoured Brigade group as 16 Cromwells, four Fireflies and three Stuarts. Lionel Ellis, the British official historian, gave 25 tank losses and D'Este and Delaforce 27 tanks (20 Cromwells). Forty notes that the brigade group lost these tanks over 48 hours from 13 to 14 June. Marie and Reynolds note that 27 combat tanks and three artillery 'OP' tanks were destroyed. Some sources record the loss of 14 half-tracks and 14 universal carriers, and Reynolds wrote that there were 16 universal carrier losses; Marie counted 11 half-tracks and six universal carriers. Three scout cars, nine Daimler armoured cars and two anti-tank guns were also lost during the battle.) The Panzer-Lehr Division and the 2nd Panzer Division were in action elsewhere on 13 June and did not count the casualties at Villers-Bocage separate from the day's losses. The 101st SS Heavy Panzer Battalion was only engaged at Villers-Bocage; Taylor gave figures of nine men killed and ten wounded in the 1st Company and one killed and three wounded in the 2nd Company.

Sources differ on the number of German tanks lost, in part because the Panzer-Lehr Division was committed piecemeal, making it impossible to be certain of the number of Panzer IVs knocked out. German tank losses are generally considered to be from 8 to 15, including six Tigers. (Note: Wilmot quoted Bayerlein, who reported the loss of six Tigers at Villers-Bocage. Agte and Reynolds record the loss of six Tigers and two Panzer IVs. Forty wrote that up to six Tigers and three Panzer IVs were knocked out during the fighting, from the 7th Armoured Division history. Marie counted six Tigers destroyed, five Panzer IVs and other tanks damaged. Taylor reported British claims to have disabled 14 tanks; the 4th CLY claimed four Tigers and three Panzer IVs, the Rifle Brigade claimed one Tiger, while the 1/7th QRR claimed four Tigers with 6-pounder anti-tank guns and a Tiger and a Panzer IV with PIATs. Delaforce wrote that the British knocked out 15 German tanks during the battle. Fortin also quoted the figure but that it included tanks that had been damaged. In 2000, Niklas Zetterling noted that by 16 June, the 101st SS Heavy Panzer Battalion had only 15 operational tanks; nine had been destroyed and 21 were under repair. Additional German losses included one armoured car, one Kübelwagen and two half-tracks.) Chester Wilmot states that this was a serious loss, as there were only 36 Tiger tanks in Normandy. Taylor wrote that the numbers claimed by the British included tanks that were immobilised and later recovered. Marie named at least nine French civilians who died on 13 June. Six were killed by crossfire or shrapnel during the battle and three by artillery-fire just before midnight. Three of the deaths may have been war crimes. More civilians became casualties in the fighting and bombing later. Following the British withdrawal, the town was reoccupied and searched by the Germans; several shops, houses and the town hall were set on fire.

=== Bombing and liberation ===
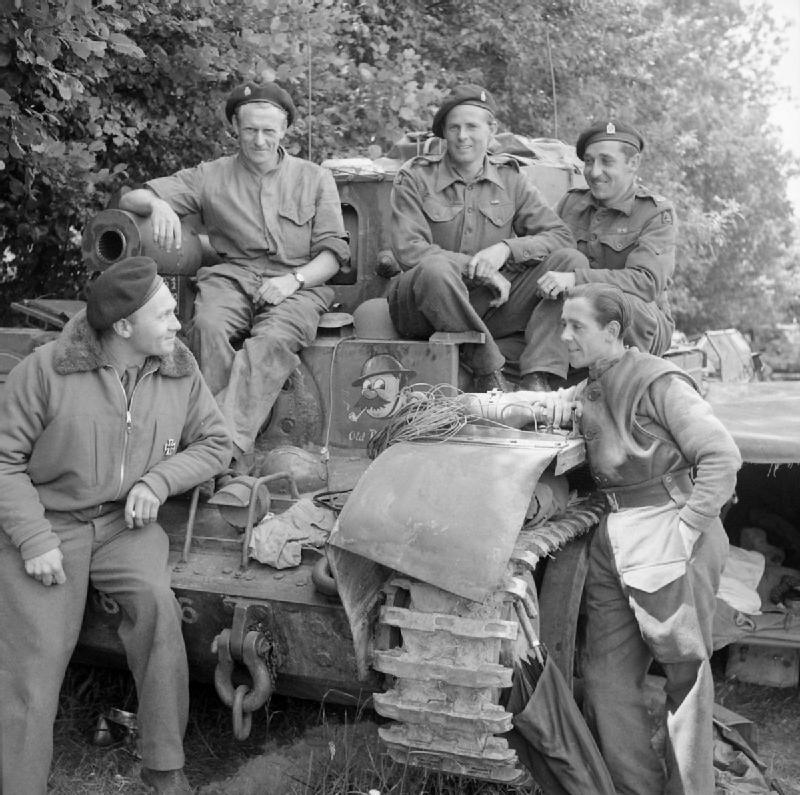
Bill Cotton (on the left wearing a looted Iron Cross) and his tank crew

During the night of 14/15 June, to cover the withdrawal of the 22nd Armoured Brigade group, 337 Royal Air Force (RAF) bombers (223 Lancasters, 100 Halifaxes and 14 Mosquitos from 4 Group, 5 Group and 8 (Pathfinder) Group) dropped 1,700 long tons (1,700 t) of high explosives on the town of Évrecy and on targets around Villers-Bocage, destroying one Tiger tank and damaging three more for the loss of no aircraft. Just over two weeks later, at 20:30 on 30 June, Villers-Bocage was bombed again by 266 bombers (151 Lancasters, 105 Halifaxes and 10 Mosquitos from 3 Group, 4 Group and 8 [Pathfinder] Group) in support of Operation Epsom, dropping 1,100 long tons (1,100 t) of bombs for the loss of two aircraft. The town was a vital traffic centre for German forces and though it was hoped that German troops would be caught in the bombing, only French civilians were present at the time. After being severely damaged by the fighting of 13 June and subsequent bombing raids, the town was liberated by a patrol of the 1st Battalion Dorset Regiment, 50th (Northumbrian) Infantry Division, on 4 August 1944.

=== Command changes ===
In early August, up to 100 men, including Bucknall, Erskine, Hinde and other senior officers were sacked and reassigned. Historians largely agree that this was a consequence of the failure at Villers-Bocage and had been planned since the battle. Daniel Taylor is of the opinion that the battle's outcome simply provided a convenient excuse and that the sackings took place to "demonstrate that the army command was doing something to counteract the poor public opinion of the conduct of the campaign".

=== Battle honours and awards ===
In 1956 and 1957, the British and Commonwealth system of battle honours recognised participation in the Battle of Villers-Bocage by the award to 11 units of the battle honour Villers Bocage, for service in expanding the bridgehead from 8–15 June. For his actions at Villers-Bocage, Michael Wittmann was promoted to Hauptsturmführer and awarded Swords to his Knight's Cross of the Iron Cross.
