= Amayé =

Amayé may refer to the following places in Calvados, France:

- Amayé-sur-Orne
- Amayé-sur-Seulles
