= Arrondissement of Vire =

Coordinates: 48°50′27″N 0°53′47″W

Vire
- Arrondissement
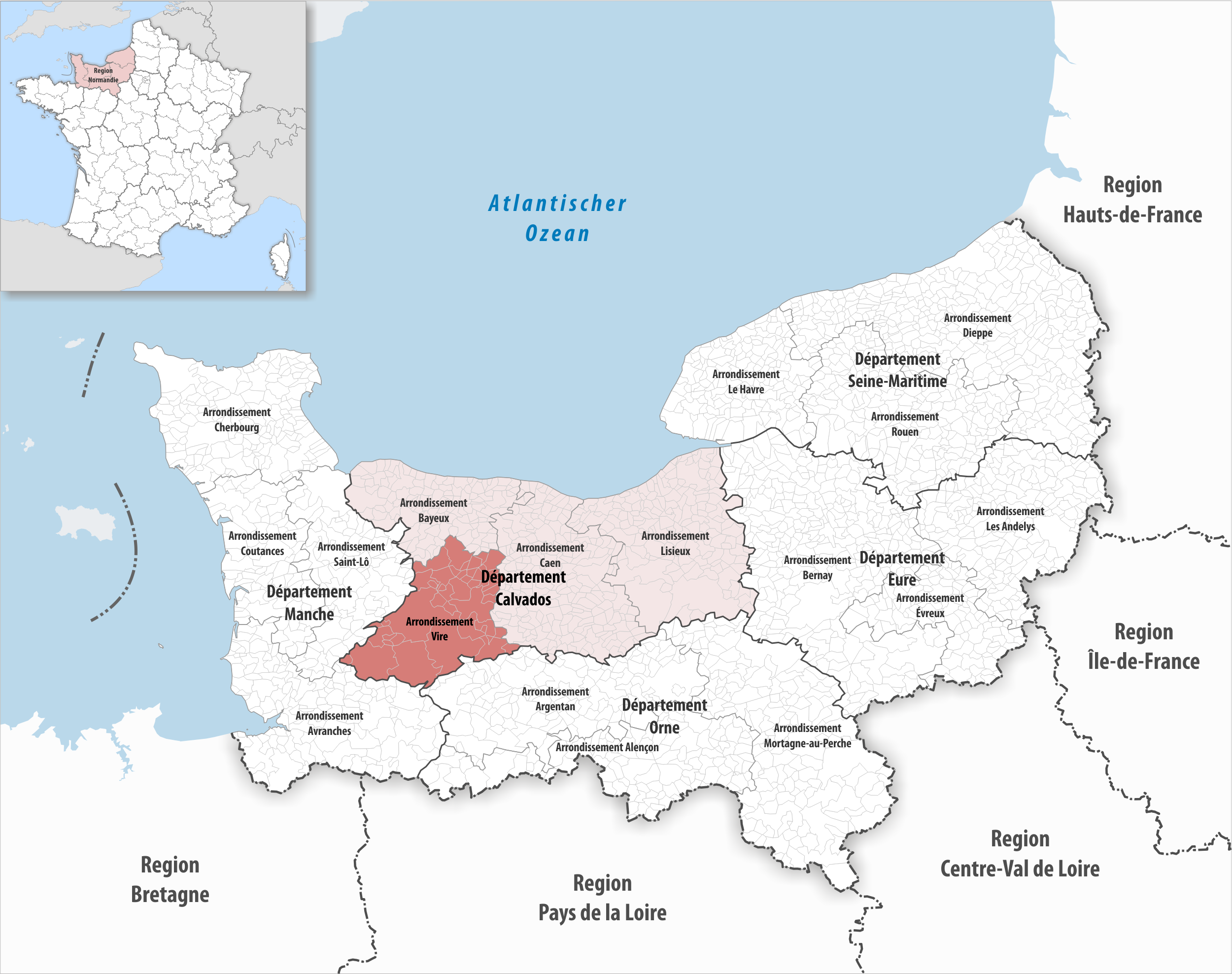
- Location within the region Normandy
- Country: France
- Region: Normandy
- Department: Calvados
- No. of communes: {{{nbcomm}}}
- Area: 1,205.9 km^{2} (465.6 sq mi)
- Population (2023): 71,309
  - Density: 59.133/km^{2} (153.15/sq mi)
- INSEE code: 144

The arrondissement of Vire is an arrondissement of France in the Calvados department in the Normandy region. It has 44 communes. Its population is 71,033 (2021), and its area is 1,205.9 km^{2} (465.6 sq mi).

== Composition ==
The communes of the arrondissement of Vire, and their INSEE codes, are:

1. Amayé-sur-Seulles (14007)
2. Aurseulles (14011)
3. Beaumesnil (14054)
4. Bonnemaison (14084)
5. Brémoy (14096)
6. Cahagnes (14120)
7. Campagnolles (14127)
8. Caumont-sur-Aure (14143)
9. Condé-en-Normandie (14174)
10. Courvaudon (14195)
11. Dialan sur Chaîne (14347)
12. Épinay-sur-Odon (14241)
13. Landelles-et-Coupigny (14352)
14. Landes-sur-Ajon (14353)
15. Les Loges (14374)
16. Longvillers (14379)
17. Maisoncelles-Pelvey (14389)
18. Maisoncelles-sur-Ajon (14390)
19. Malherbe-sur-Ajon (14037)
20. Le Mesnil-au-Grain (14412)
21. Le Mesnil-Robert (14424)
22. Les Monts d'Aunay (14027)
23. Monts-en-Bessin (14449)
24. Noues de Sienne (14658)
25. Parfouru-sur-Odon (14491)
26. Périgny (14496)
27. Pont-Bellanger (14511)
28. Pontécoulant (14512)
29. Saint-Aubin-des-Bois (14559)
30. Saint-Denis-de-Méré (14572)
31. Sainte-Marie-Outre-l'Eau (14619)
32. Saint-Louet-sur-Seulles (14607)
33. Saint-Pierre-du-Fresne (14650)
34. Seulline (14579)
35. Souleuvre en Bocage (14061)
36. Terres de Druance (14357)
37. Tracy-Bocage (14708)
38. Valdallière (14726)
39. Val d'Arry (14475)
40. Val de Drôme (14672)
41. Villers-Bocage (14752)
42. La Villette (14756)
43. Villy-Bocage (14760)
44. Vire Normandie (14762)

== History ==
The arrondissement of Vire was created in 1800. At the January 2017 reorganisation of the arrondissements of Calvados, it gained 20 communes from the arrondissement of Caen and four communes from the arrondissement of Bayeux.

As a result of the reorganisation of the cantons of France which came into effect in 2015, the borders of the cantons are no longer related to the borders of the arrondissements. The cantons of the arrondissement of Vire were, as of January 2015:

1. Aunay-sur-Odon
2. Le Bény-Bocage
3. Condé-sur-Noireau
4. Saint-Sever-Calvados
5. Vassy
6. Vire

== Sub-prefects ==
- Régis Guyot (1978)
