= Le Mesnil-au-Grain =

- Commune
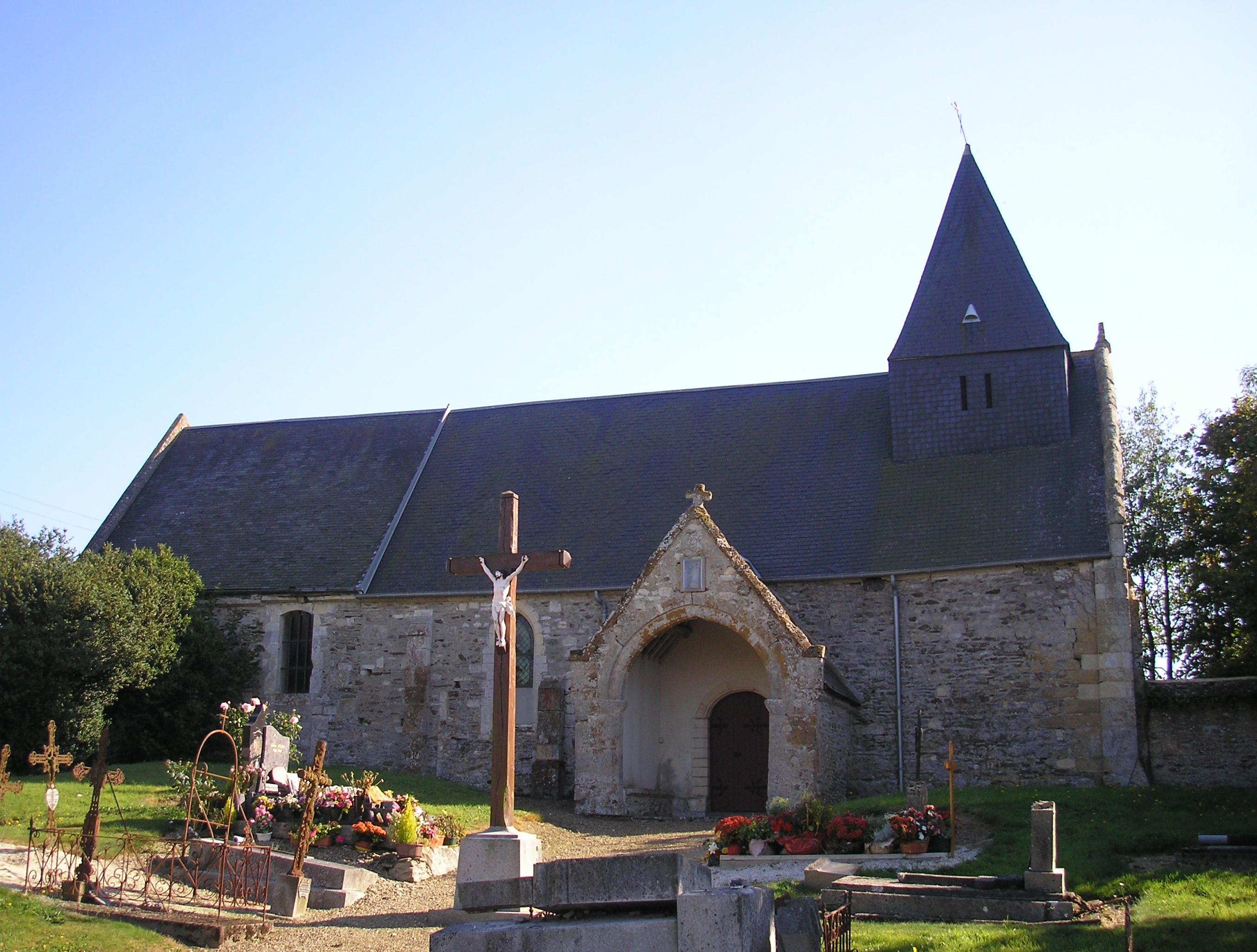
- The church in Le Mesnil-au-Grain
- Location of Le Mesnil-au-Grain
- Location within France Location within Normandy
- Coordinates: 49°02′42″N 0°35′54″W
- Country: France
- Region: Normandy
- Department: Calvados
- Arrondissement: Vire
- Canton: Les Monts d'Aunay
- Intercommunality: Pré-Bocage Intercom

Government
  - Mayor (2020–2026): Annick Solier
- Area^{1}: 4.30 km^{2} (1.66 sq mi)
- Elevation: 150 m (490 ft)
- Highest elevation: 197 m (646 ft)
- Lowest elevation: 88 m (289 ft)
- Population (2023): 74
  - Density: 17/km^{2} (45/sq mi)
- Time zone: UTC+01:00 (CET)
  - Summer (DST): UTC+02:00 (CEST)
- INSEE/Postal code: 14412 /14260
- ^{1} French Land Register data, which excludes lakes, ponds, glaciers > 1 km^{2} (0.386 sq mi or 247 acres) and river estuaries.

Le Mesnil-au-Grain (French pronunciation: [lə menil o ɡʁɛ̃]) is a commune in the Calvados department in the Normandy region in northwestern France.

== Geography ==
The commune is made up of the following collection of villages and hamlets, Montvarat, Le Mesnil-au-Grain and Le Cabaret.

A single river the Odon, flows through the commune.

== Population ==
Historical population
Year	Pop.	±% p.a.
1968	40	—
1975	40	+0.00%
1982	37	−1.11%
1990	50	+3.84%
1999	57	+1.47%
2007	56	−0.22%
2012	67	+3.65%
2017	77	+2.82%
2023	74	−0.66%
Source: INSEE

== See also ==
- Communes of the Calvados department
