= Monts-en-Bessin =

- Commune
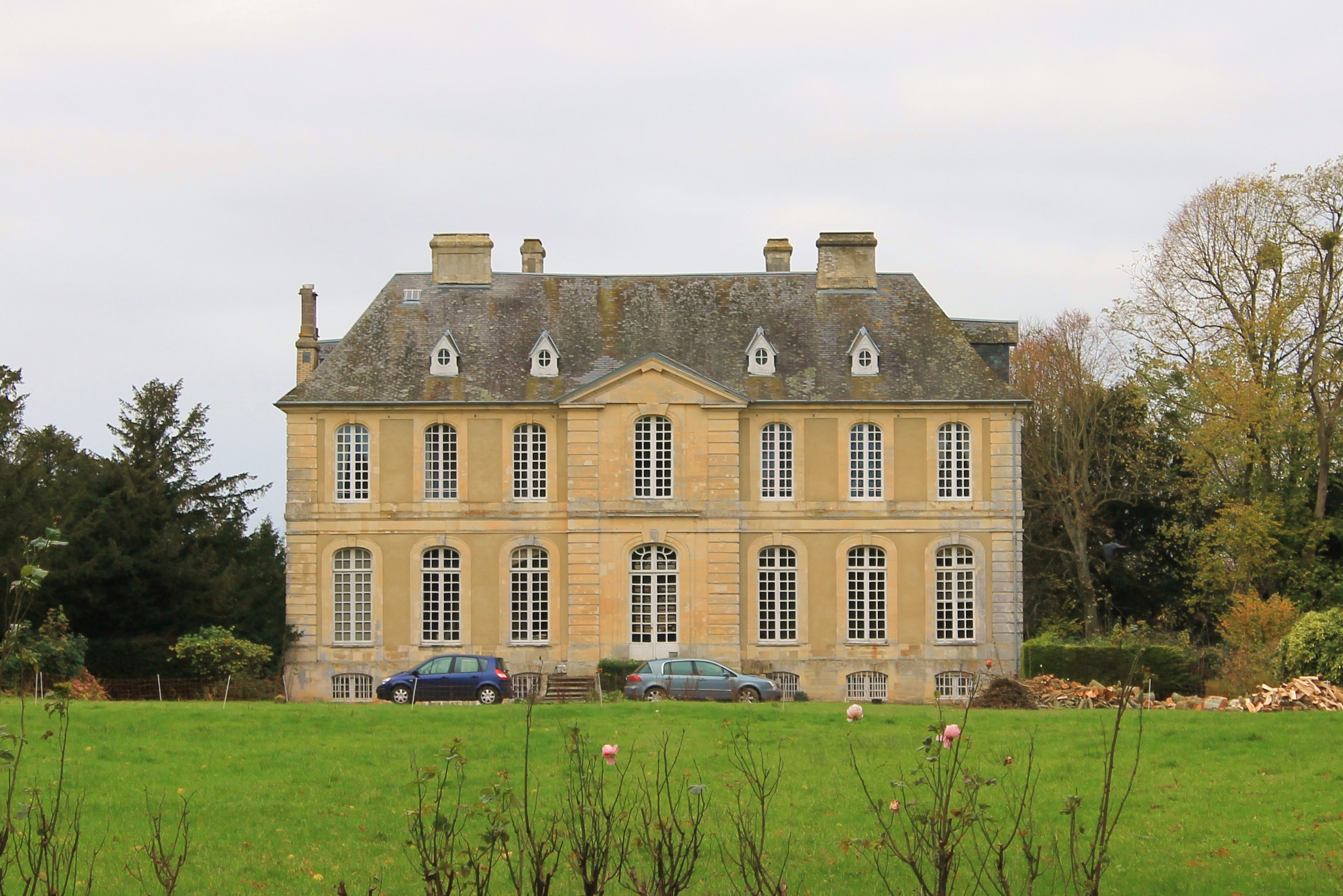
- The chateau in Monts-en-Bessin
- Location of Monts-en-Bessin
- Location within France Location within Normandy
- Coordinates: 49°06′55″N 0°36′08″W
- Country: France
- Region: Normandy
- Department: Calvados
- Arrondissement: Vire
- Canton: Les Monts d'Aunay
- Intercommunality: Pré-Bocage Intercom

Government
  - Mayor (2023–2026): Edith Langlois
- Area^{1}: 7.16 km^{2} (2.76 sq mi)
- Elevation: 100 m (330 ft)
- Highest elevation: 192 m (630 ft)
- Lowest elevation: 82 m (269 ft)
- Population (2023): 422
  - Density: 58.9/km^{2} (153/sq mi)
- Time zone: UTC+01:00 (CET)
  - Summer (DST): UTC+02:00 (CEST)
- INSEE/Postal code: 14449 /14310
- ^{1} French Land Register data, which excludes lakes, ponds, glaciers > 1 km^{2} (0.386 sq mi or 247 acres) and river estuaries.

Monts-en-Bessin (French pronunciation: [mɔ̃ ɑ̃ bɛsɛ̃], literally Monts in Bessin) is a commune in the department of Calvados in the Normandy region in northwestern France.

== Population ==
Historical population
| Year | Pop. | ±% p.a. |
|---|---|---|
| 1968 | 294 | — |
| 1975 | 256 | −1.96% |
| 1982 | 343 | +4.27% |
| 1990 | 373 | +1.05% |
| 1999 | 388 | +0.44% |
| 2007 | 392 | +0.13% |
| 2012 | 419 | +1.34% |
| 2017 | 415 | −0.19% |
| 2023 | 422 | +0.28% |
Source: INSEE

== See also ==
- Communes of the Calvados department
