= Landes-sur-Ajon =

- Commune
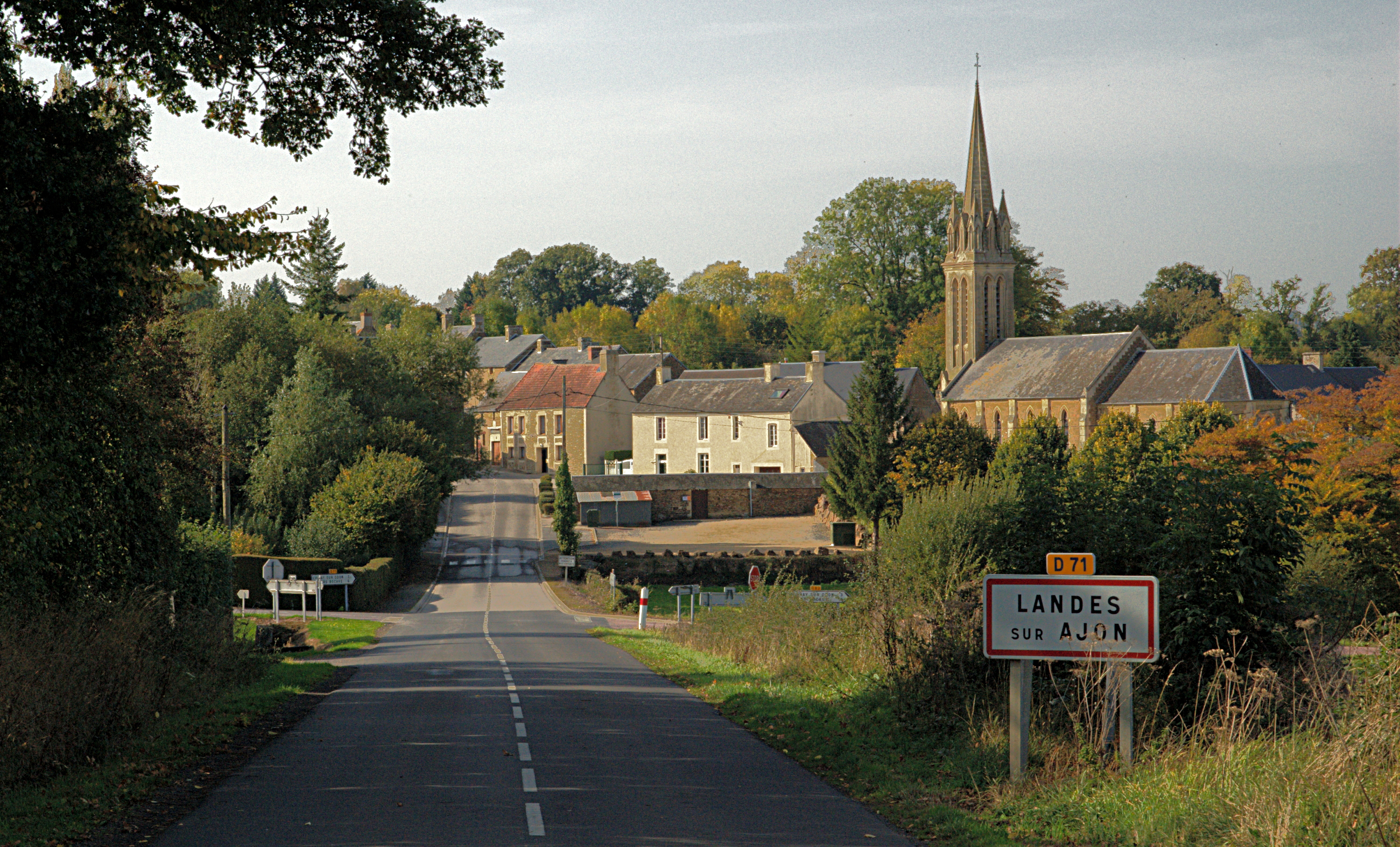
- The road into Landes-sur-Ajon
- Location of Landes-sur-Ajon
- Location within France Location within Normandy
- Coordinates: 49°04′36″N 0°34′42″W
- Country: France
- Region: Normandy
- Department: Calvados
- Arrondissement: Vire
- Canton: Les Monts d'Aunay
- Intercommunality: Pré-Bocage Intercom

Government
  - Mayor (2020–2026): Didier Vergy
- Area^{1}: 6.00 km^{2} (2.32 sq mi)
- Elevation: 110 m (360 ft)
- Highest elevation: 175 m (574 ft)
- Lowest elevation: 70 m (230 ft)
- Population (2023): 451
  - Density: 75.2/km^{2} (195/sq mi)
- Time zone: UTC+01:00 (CET)
  - Summer (DST): UTC+02:00 (CEST)
- INSEE/Postal code: 14353 /14310
- ^{1} French Land Register data, which excludes lakes, ponds, glaciers > 1 km^{2} (0.386 sq mi or 247 acres) and river estuaries.

Landes-sur-Ajon (French pronunciation: [lɑ̃d syʁ aʒɔ̃]) is a commune in the Calvados department in the Normandy region in northwestern France.

== Geography ==
The commune is made up of the following collection of villages and hamlets, Le Bas de Landes, Le Haut de Landes and Landes-sur-Ajon.

The river Ajon flows through the commune.

== Population ==
Historical population
Year	Pop.	±% p.a.
1968	170	—
1975	163	−0.60%
1982	215	+4.03%
1990	250	+1.90%
1999	252	+0.09%
2007	340	+3.81%
2012	406	+3.61%
2017	426	+0.97%
2023	451	+0.95%
Source: INSEE

== See also ==
- Communes of the Calvados department
