= Les Loges, Calvados =

Les Loges
- Commune
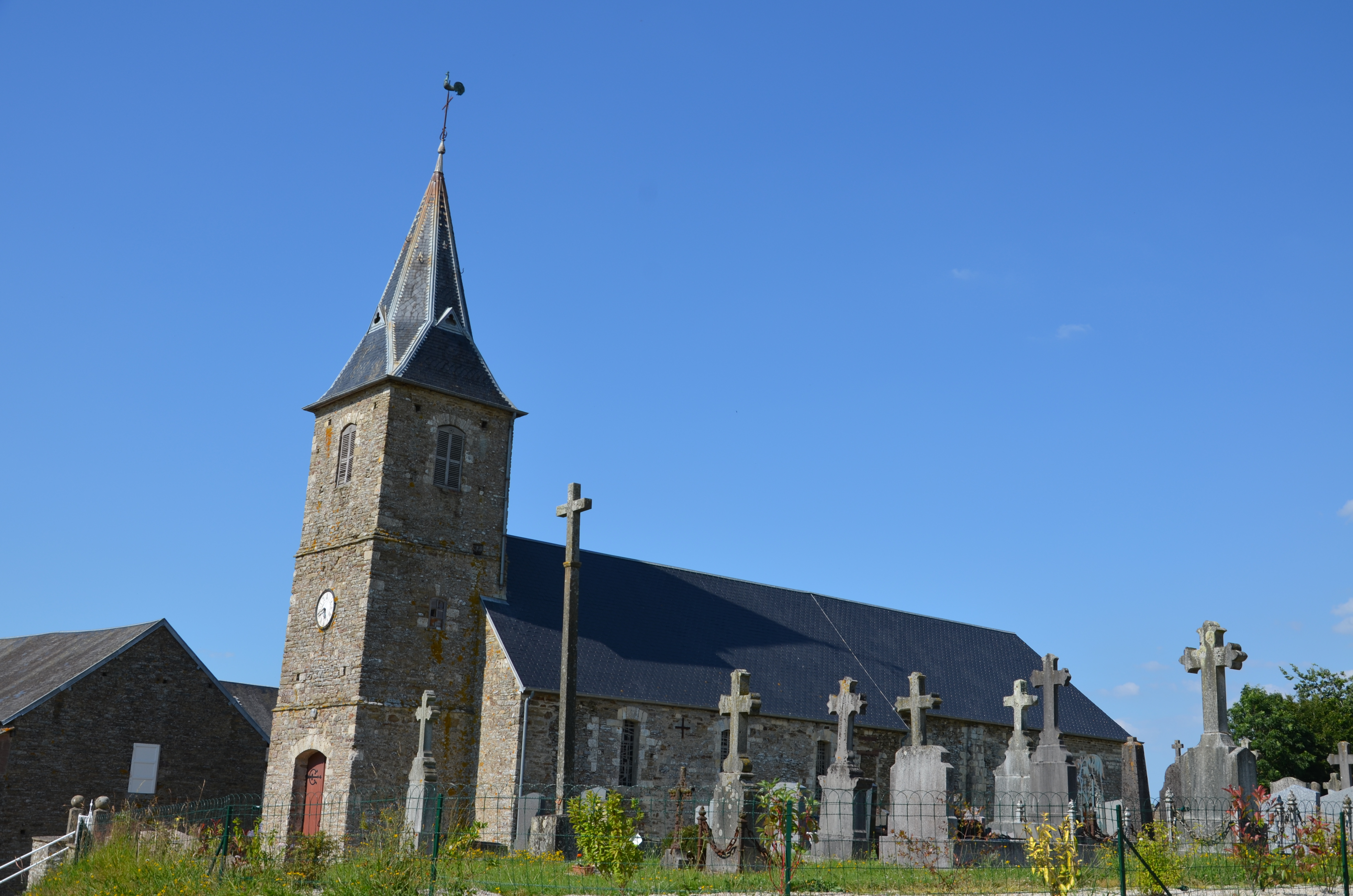
- The church in Les Loges
- Location of Les Loges
- Location within France Location within Normandy
- Coordinates: 49°02′38″N 0°48′18″W
- Country: France
- Region: Normandy
- Department: Calvados
- Arrondissement: Vire
- Canton: Les Monts d'Aunay
- Intercommunality: Pré-Bocage Intercom

Government
  - Mayor (2020–2026): Joël Levert
- Area^{1}: 4.46 km^{2} (1.72 sq mi)
- Elevation: 230 m (750 ft)
- Highest elevation: 255 m (837 ft)
- Lowest elevation: 137 m (449 ft)
- Population (2023): 136
  - Density: 30.5/km^{2} (79.0/sq mi)
- Time zone: UTC+01:00 (CET)
  - Summer (DST): UTC+02:00 (CEST)
- INSEE/Postal code: 14374 /14240
- ^{1} French Land Register data, which excludes lakes, ponds, glaciers > 1 km^{2} (0.386 sq mi or 247 acres) and river estuaries.

Les Loges (French pronunciation: [le lɔʒ]) is a commune in the Calvados department in the Normandy region in northwestern France.

== Population ==
Historical population
Year	Pop.	±% p.a.
1968	165	—
1975	126	−3.78%
1982	128	+0.23%
1990	110	−1.88%
1999	115	+0.50%
2007	135	+2.02%
2012	125	−1.53%
2017	132	+1.10%
2023	136	+0.50%
Source: INSEE

== See also ==
- Communes of the Calvados department
