= Saint-Louet-sur-Seulles =

- Commune
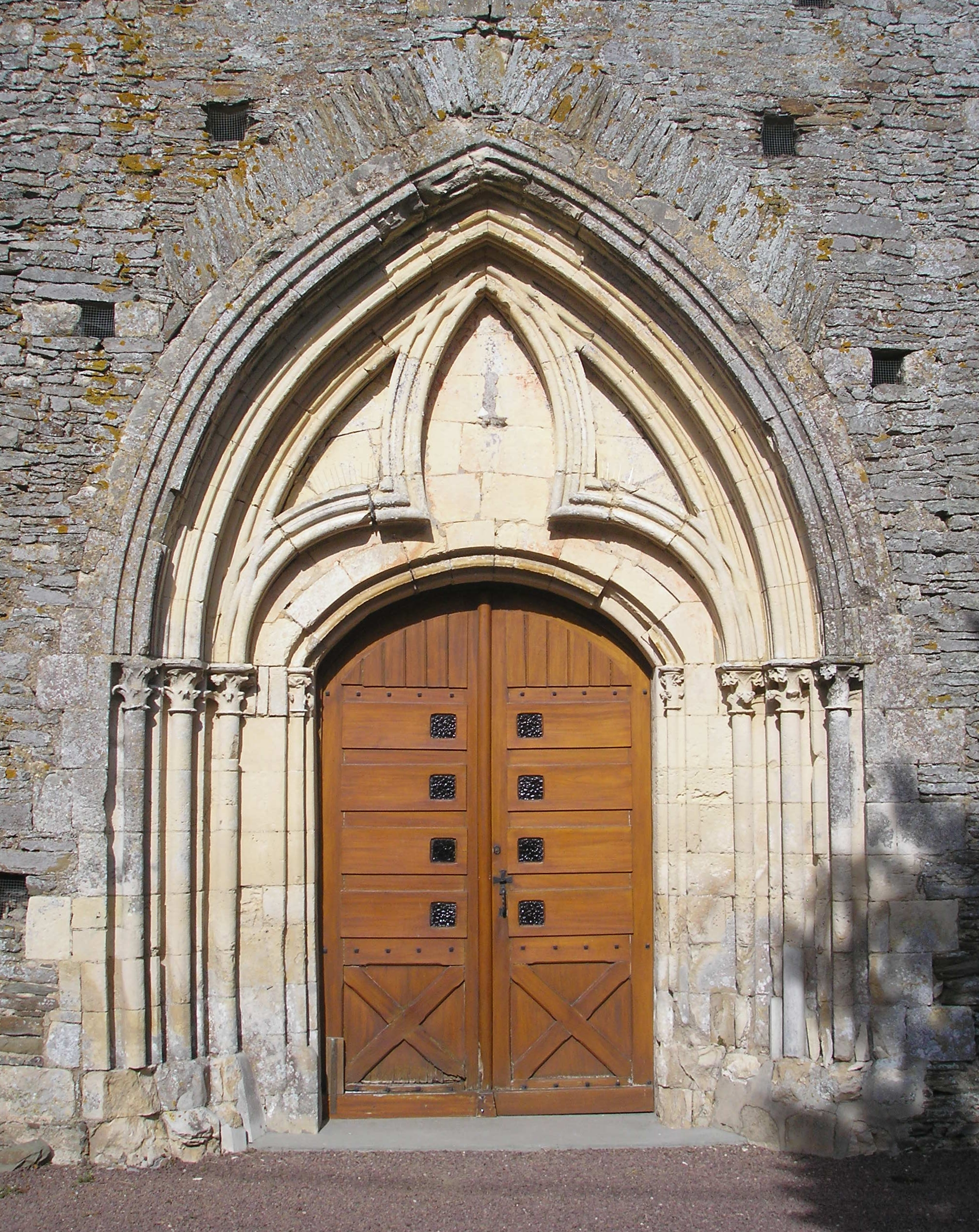
- The doorway of the church
- Location of Saint-Louet-sur-Seulles
- Location within France Location within Normandy
- Coordinates: 49°05′51″N 0°39′57″W
- Country: France
- Region: Normandy
- Department: Calvados
- Arrondissement: Vire
- Canton: Les Monts d'Aunay

Government
  - Mayor (2020–2026): Yves Piet
- Area^{1}: 4.33 km^{2} (1.67 sq mi)
- Elevation: 93 m (305 ft)
- Highest elevation: 141 m (463 ft)
- Lowest elevation: 77 m (253 ft)
- Population (2023): 148
  - Density: 34.2/km^{2} (88.5/sq mi)
- Time zone: UTC+01:00 (CET)
  - Summer (DST): UTC+02:00 (CEST)
- INSEE/Postal code: 14607 /14310
- ^{1} French Land Register data, which excludes lakes, ponds, glaciers > 1 km^{2} (0.386 sq mi or 247 acres) and river estuaries.

Saint-Louet-sur-Seulles (French pronunciation: [sɛ̃ lwɛ syʁ sœl], literally Saint-Louet on Seulles) is a commune in the Calvados department in the Normandy region in northwestern France.

== Population ==
Historical population
Year	Pop.	±% p.a.
1968	158	—
1975	165	+0.62%
1982	128	−3.56%
1990	144	+1.48%
1999	171	+1.93%
2007	177	+0.43%
2012	178	+0.11%
2017	148	−3.62%
2023	148	+0.00%
Source: INSEE

== See also ==
- Communes of the Calvados department
