= Bonnemaison =

- Commune
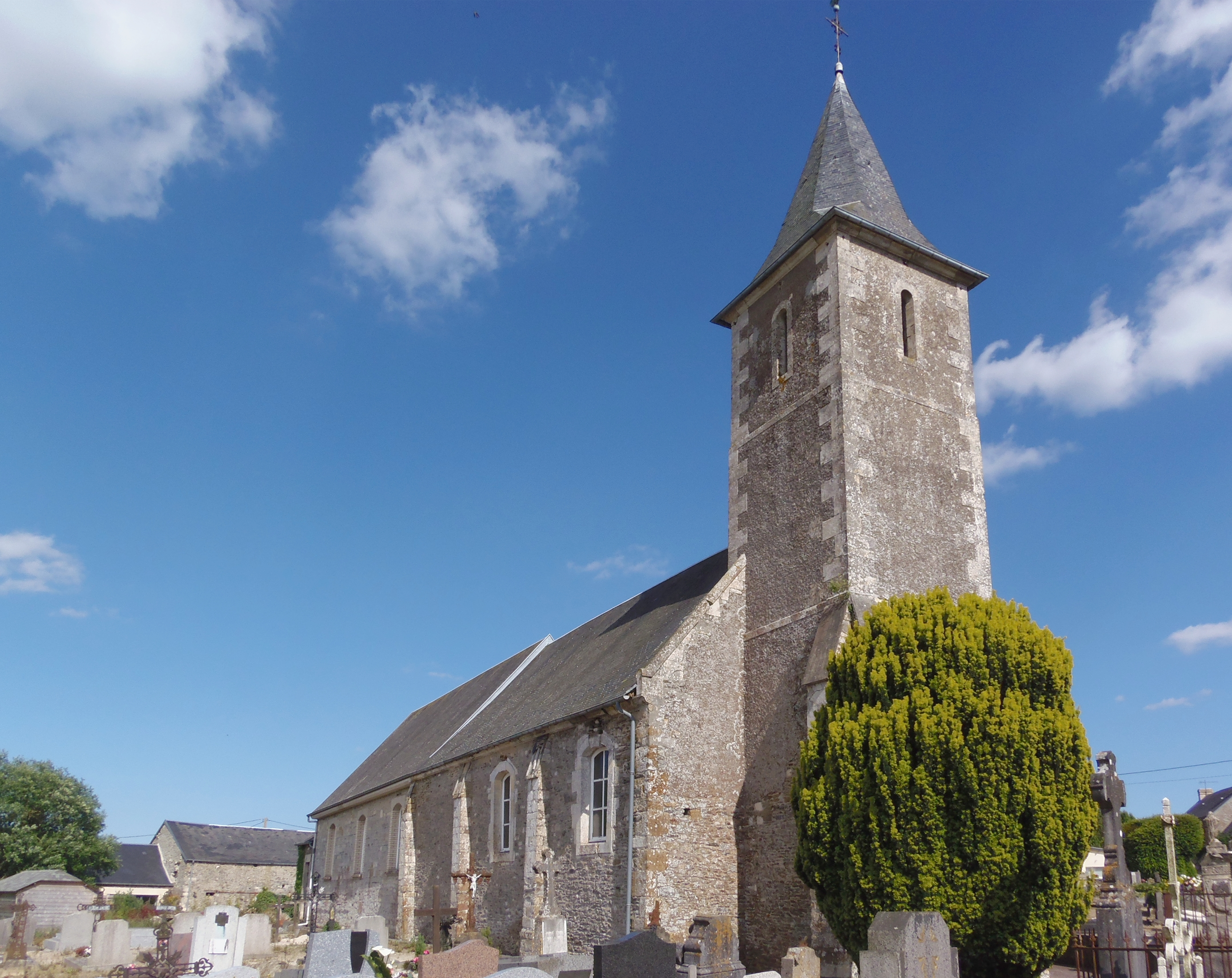
- The church in Bonnemaison
- Location of Bonnemaison
- Location within France Location within Normandy
- Coordinates: 49°00′42″N 0°34′58″W
- Country: France
- Region: Normandy
- Department: Calvados
- Arrondissement: Vire
- Canton: Les Monts d'Aunay

Government
  - Mayor (2020–2026): Pierre Salliot
- Area^{1}: 8.4 km^{2} (3.2 sq mi)
- Elevation: 200 m (660 ft)
- Highest elevation: 298 m (978 ft)
- Lowest elevation: 99 m (325 ft)
- Population (2023): 398
  - Density: 47/km^{2} (120/sq mi)
- Time zone: UTC+01:00 (CET)
  - Summer (DST): UTC+02:00 (CEST)
- INSEE/Postal code: 14084 /14260
- ^{1} French Land Register data, which excludes lakes, ponds, glaciers > 1 km^{2} (0.386 sq mi or 247 acres) and river estuaries.

Bonnemaison (French pronunciation: [bɔnmɛzɔ̃]) is a commune in the Calvados department in the Normandy region in northwestern France.

== Geography ==
The commune is made up of the following collection of villages and hamlets, Le Bourg Joli, La Véranguerie, Bonnemaison, Lamberville, La Rouelle and Le Haut Bosq.

The commune is on the border of the area known as Suisse Normande.

== Population ==
Historical population
Year	Pop.	±% p.a.
1968	208	—
1975	184	−1.74%
1982	317	+8.08%
1990	331	+0.54%
1999	324	−0.24%
2007	360	+1.33%
2012	379	+1.03%
2017	404	+1.29%
2023	398	−0.25%
Source: INSEE

== See also ==
- Communes of the Calvados department
