= Longvillers =

- Commune
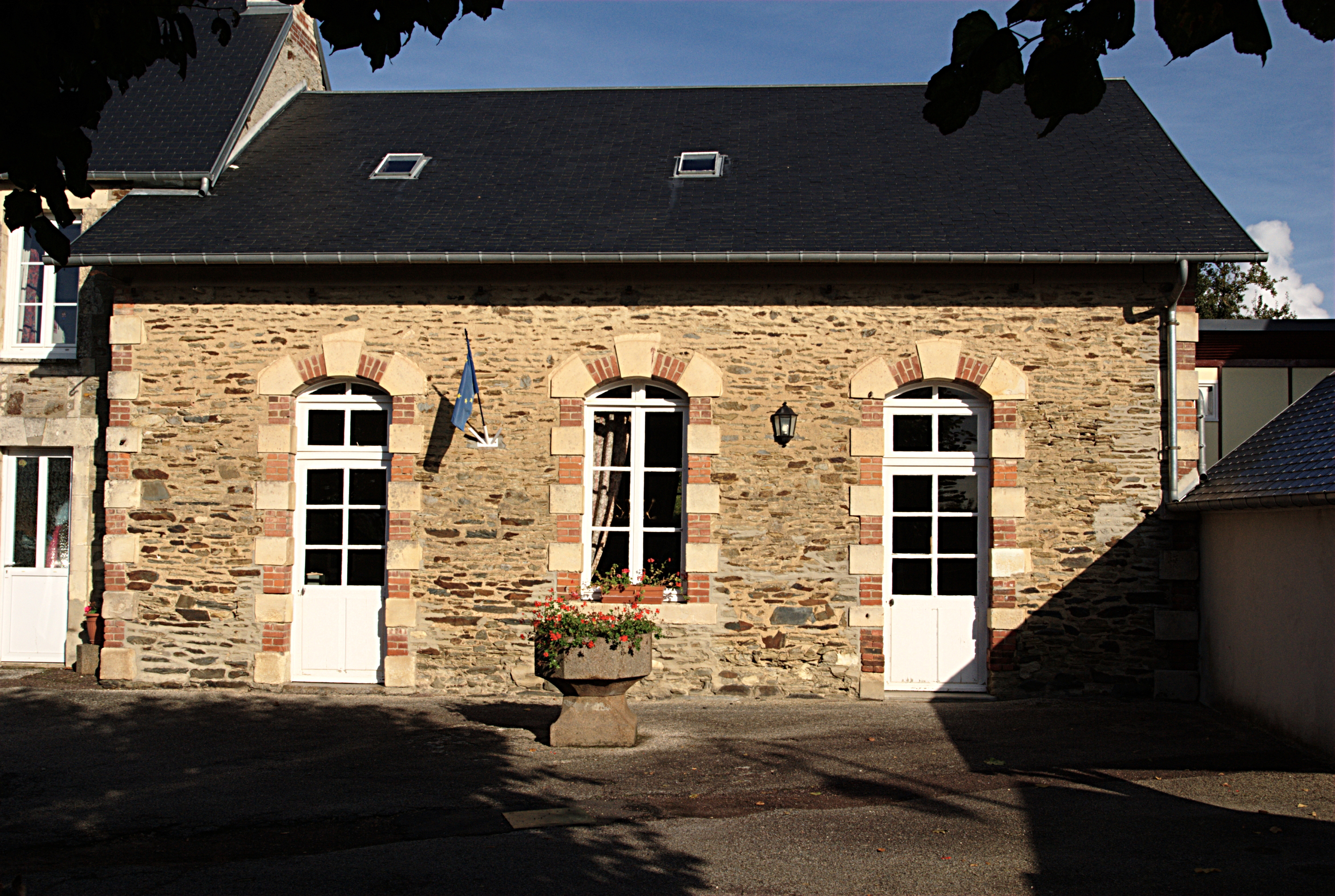
- Town hall
- Location of Longvillers
- Location within France Location within Normandy
- Coordinates: 49°03′09″N 0°37′48″W
- Country: France
- Region: Normandy
- Department: Calvados
- Arrondissement: Vire
- Canton: Les Monts d'Aunay
- Intercommunality: Pré-Bocage Intercom

Government
  - Mayor (2020–2026): Bertrand Gosset
- Area^{1}: 6.65 km^{2} (2.57 sq mi)
- Elevation: 118 m (387 ft)
- Highest elevation: 187 m (614 ft)
- Lowest elevation: 87 m (285 ft)
- Population (2023): 353
  - Density: 53.1/km^{2} (137/sq mi)
- Time zone: UTC+01:00 (CET)
  - Summer (DST): UTC+02:00 (CEST)
- INSEE/Postal code: 14379 /14310
- ^{1} French Land Register data, which excludes lakes, ponds, glaciers > 1 km^{2} (0.386 sq mi or 247 acres) and river estuaries.

Longvillers is a commune in the Calvados department in the Normandy region in northwestern France.

== Geography ==
The commune is made up of the following collection of villages and hamlets, La Capelle and Longvillers.

A single river the Odon, flows through the commune. There are also two streams that traverse the commune, the Ruisseau de Beslondes and the Ruisseau du Val Boquet.

== Population ==
Historical population
Year	Pop.	±% p.a.
1968	221	—
1975	218	−0.20%
1982	268	+2.99%
1990	288	+0.90%
1999	323	+1.28%
2007	329	+0.23%
2012	369	+2.32%
2017	360	−0.49%
2023	353	−0.33%
Source: INSEE

== See also ==
- Communes of the Calvados department
