= Saint-Pierre-du-Fresne =

- Commune
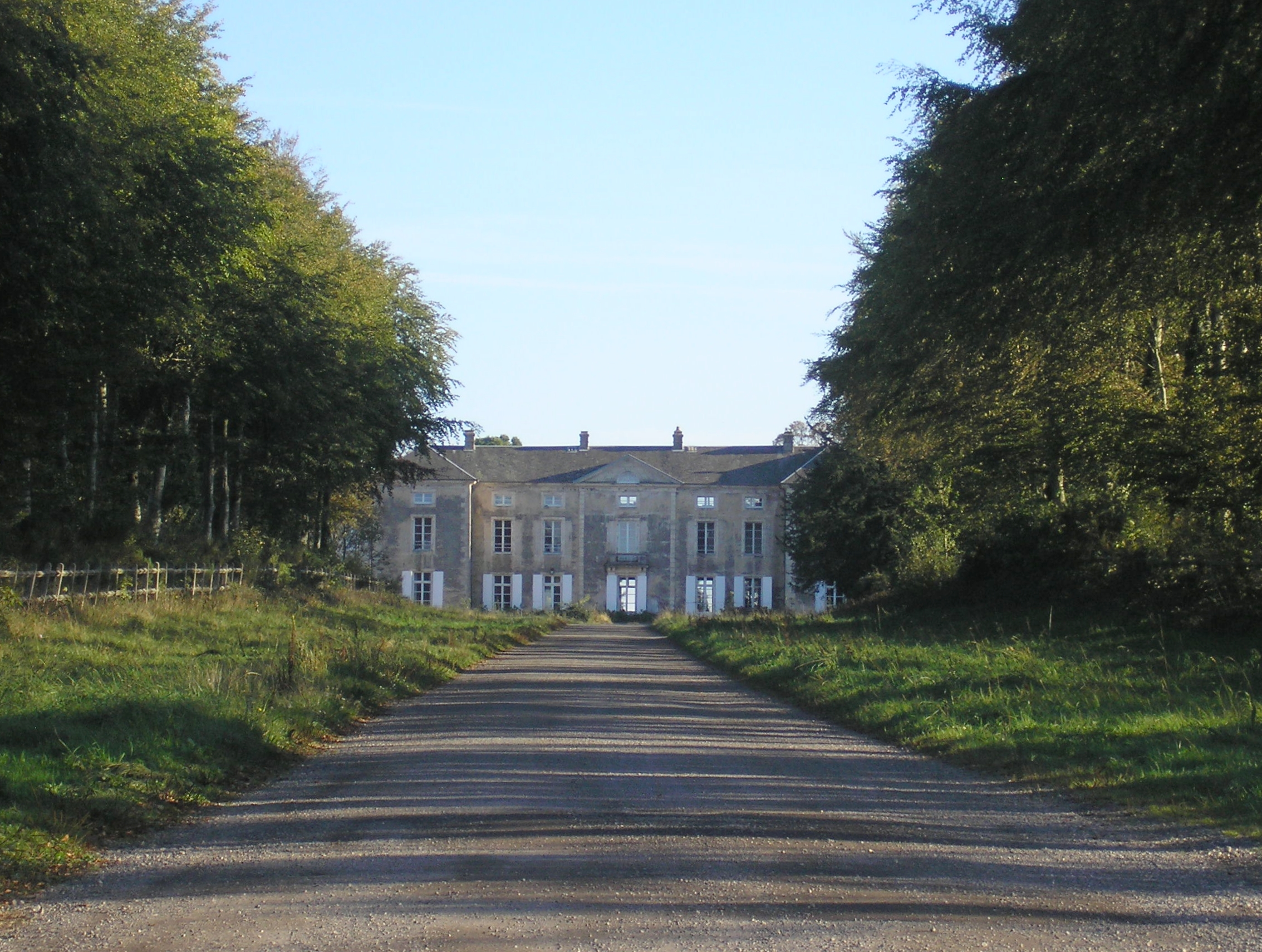
- Château du Fresne
- Location of Saint-Pierre-du-Fresne
- Location within France Location within Normandy
- Coordinates: 49°02′09″N 0°45′39″W
- Country: France
- Region: Normandy
- Department: Calvados
- Arrondissement: Vire
- Canton: Les Monts d'Aunay
- Intercommunality: Pré-Bocage Intercom

Government
  - Mayor (2020–2026): Alain Quéhé
- Area^{1}: 3.43 km^{2} (1.32 sq mi)
- Elevation: 205 m (673 ft)
- Highest elevation: 275 m (902 ft)
- Lowest elevation: 159 m (522 ft)
- Population (2023): 183
  - Density: 53.4/km^{2} (138/sq mi)
- Time zone: UTC+01:00 (CET)
  - Summer (DST): UTC+02:00 (CEST)
- INSEE/Postal code: 14650 /14260
- ^{1} French Land Register data, which excludes lakes, ponds, glaciers > 1 km^{2} (0.386 sq mi or 247 acres) and river estuaries.

Saint-Pierre-du-Fresne (French pronunciation: [sɛ̃ pjɛʁ dy fʁɛn]) is a commune in the Calvados department in the Normandy region in northwestern France.

== Population ==
Historical population
Year	Pop.	±% p.a.
1968	138	—
1975	144	+0.61%
1982	127	−1.78%
1990	127	+0.00%
1999	198	+5.06%
2007	200	+0.13%
2012	198	−0.20%
2017	195	−0.30%
2023	183	−1.05%
Source: INSEE

== See also ==
- Communes of the Calvados department
