= Parfouru-sur-Odon =

- Commune
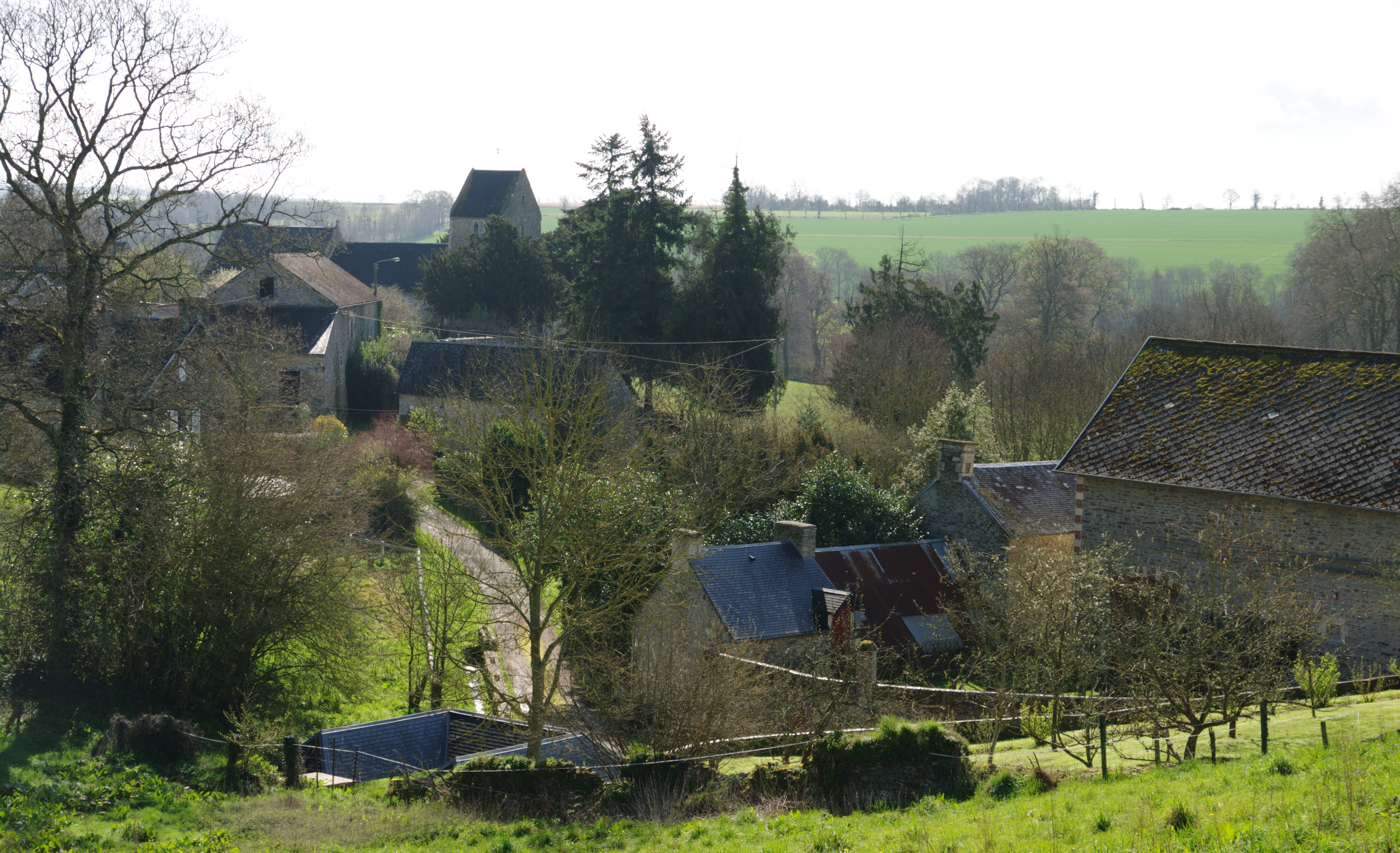
- A general view of Parfouru-sur-Odon
- Location of Parfouru-sur-Odon
- Location within France Location within Normandy
- Coordinates: 49°05′30″N 0°36′29″W
- Country: France
- Region: Normandy
- Department: Calvados
- Arrondissement: Vire
- Canton: Les Monts d'Aunay
- Intercommunality: Pré-Bocage Intercom

Government
  - Mayor (2020–2026): David Piccand
- Area^{1}: 3.65 km^{2} (1.41 sq mi)
- Elevation: 106 m (348 ft)
- Highest elevation: 217 m (712 ft)
- Lowest elevation: 69 m (226 ft)
- Population (2023): 198
  - Density: 54.2/km^{2} (140/sq mi)
- Time zone: UTC+01:00 (CET)
  - Summer (DST): UTC+02:00 (CEST)
- INSEE/Postal code: 14491 /14310
- ^{1} French Land Register data, which excludes lakes, ponds, glaciers > 1 km^{2} (0.386 sq mi or 247 acres) and river estuaries.

Parfouru-sur-Odon (French pronunciation: [paʁfuʁy syʁ ɔdɔ̃], literally Parfouru on Odon) is a commune in the Calvados department in the Normandy region in northwestern France.

== Geography ==
The river Odon flows through the commune.

== Population ==
Historical population
Year	Pop.	±% p.a.
1968	104	—
1975	131	+3.35%
1982	150	+1.95%
1990	147	−0.25%
1999	136	−0.86%
2007	154	+1.57%
2012	188	+4.07%
2017	196	+0.84%
2023	198	+0.17%
Source: INSEE

== See also ==
- Communes of the Calvados department
