= Villy-Bocage =

- Commune
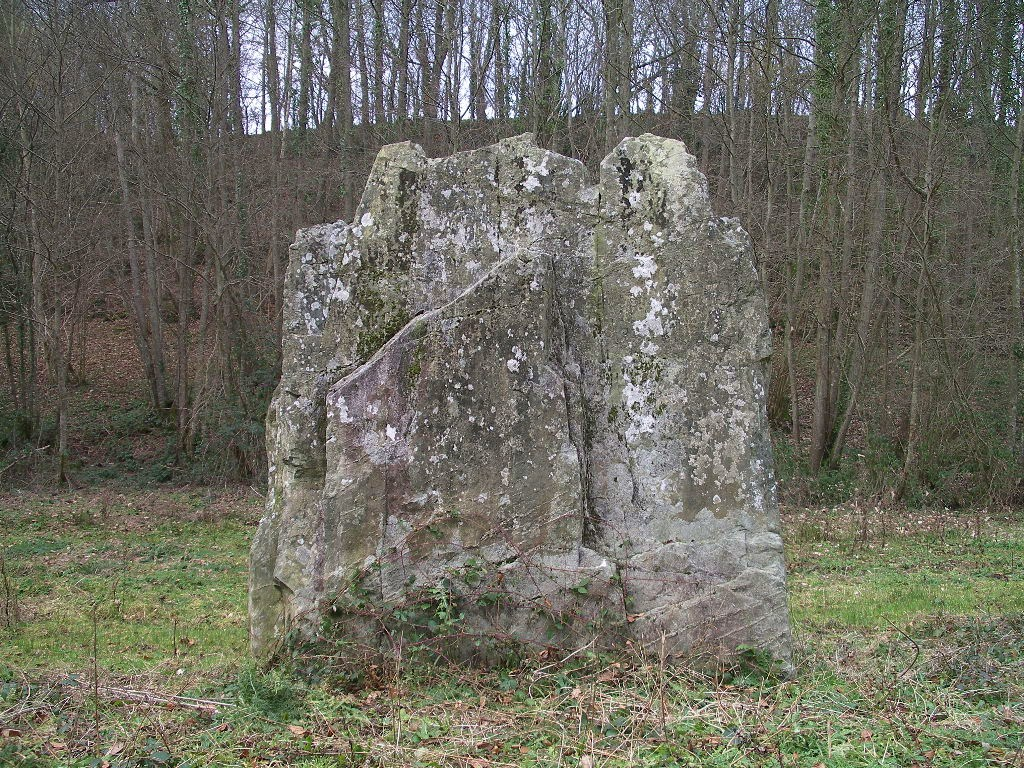
- Menhir of Pierrelaye
- Location of Villy-Bocage
- Location within France Location within Normandy
- Coordinates: 49°05′46″N 0°38′29″W
- Country: France
- Region: Normandy
- Department: Calvados
- Arrondissement: Vire
- Canton: Les Monts d'Aunay
- Intercommunality: Pré-Bocage Intercom

Government
  - Mayor (2026–32): Alexandre Lebastard
- Area^{1}: 11.39 km^{2} (4.40 sq mi)
- Elevation: 147 m (482 ft)
- Highest elevation: 217 m (712 ft)
- Lowest elevation: 68 m (223 ft)
- Population (2023): 728
  - Density: 63.9/km^{2} (166/sq mi)
- Time zone: UTC+01:00 (CET)
  - Summer (DST): UTC+02:00 (CEST)
- INSEE/Postal code: 14760 /14310
- ^{1} French Land Register data, which excludes lakes, ponds, glaciers > 1 km^{2} (0.386 sq mi or 247 acres) and river estuaries.

Villy-Bocage (French pronunciation: [viji bɔkaʒ]) is a commune in the Calvados department in the Normandy region in northwestern France.

== Population ==
Historical population
Year	Pop.	±% p.a.
1968	373	—
1975	384	+0.42%
1982	585	+6.20%
1990	646	+1.25%
1999	624	−0.38%
2007	734	+2.05%
2012	787	+1.40%
2017	782	−0.13%
2023	728	−1.19%
Source: INSEE

== See also ==
- Communes of the Calvados department
