= Canton of Les Monts d'Aunay =

Coordinates: 49.02°N 0.63°W

Les Monts d'Aunay
- Canton
- Interactive map of Les Monts d'Aunay
- Country: France
- Region: Normandy
- Department: Calvados
- No. of communes: {{{nbcomm}}}

Government
  - Representatives (2021–2028): Christian Hauret; Sylvie Lenourrichel
- Area: 423.58 km^{2} (163.55 sq mi)
- Population (2023): 25,729
  - Density: 60.742/km^{2} (157.32/sq mi)
- INSEE code: 14 01

The canton of Les Monts d'Aunay (before 2021: Aunay-sur-Odon) is an administrative division of the Calvados department, northwestern France. Its borders were modified at the French canton reorganisation which came into effect in March 2015. Its seat is in Les Monts d'Aunay.

== Composition ==
It consists of the following communes:

1. Amayé-sur-Seulles
2. Aurseulles
3. Bonnemaison
4. Brémoy
5. Cahagnes
6. Caumont-sur-Aure
7. Courvaudon
8. Dialan sur Chaîne
9. Épinay-sur-Odon
10. Hottot-les-Bagues
11. Landes-sur-Ajon
12. Lingèvres
13. Les Loges
14. Longvillers
15. Maisoncelles-Pelvey
16. Maisoncelles-sur-Ajon
17. Malherbe-sur-Ajon
18. Le Mesnil-au-Grain
19. Les Monts d'Aunay (partly)
20. Monts-en-Bessin
21. Parfouru-sur-Odon
22. Saint-Louet-sur-Seulles
23. Saint-Pierre-du-Fresne
24. Seulline
25. Tracy-Bocage
26. Val d'Arry
27. Val de Drôme
28. Villers-Bocage
29. Villy-Bocage

== Councillors ==
Election	Councillors	Party	Occupation
2015	Christian Hauret	DVD	Mayor of Maisoncelles-Pelvey
2015	Sylvie Lenourrichel	DVD	Delegate mayor of La Lande-sur-Drôme
2021	Christian Hauret	DVD	Retired farmer
2021	Sylvie Lenourrichel	DVD	Former mayor of Val de Drôme

== Pictures of the canton ==
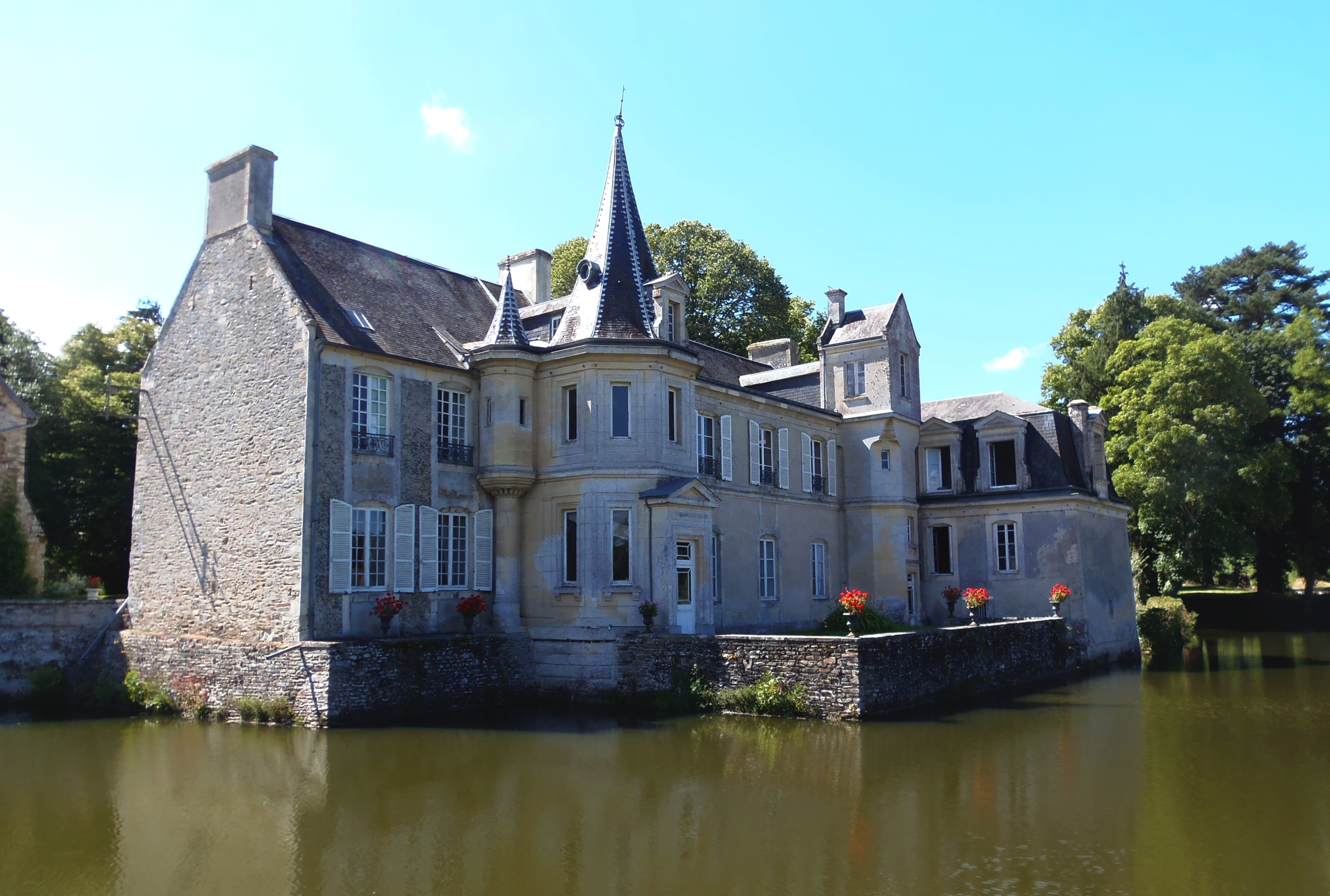
Parfouru castle in Caumont-sur-Aure

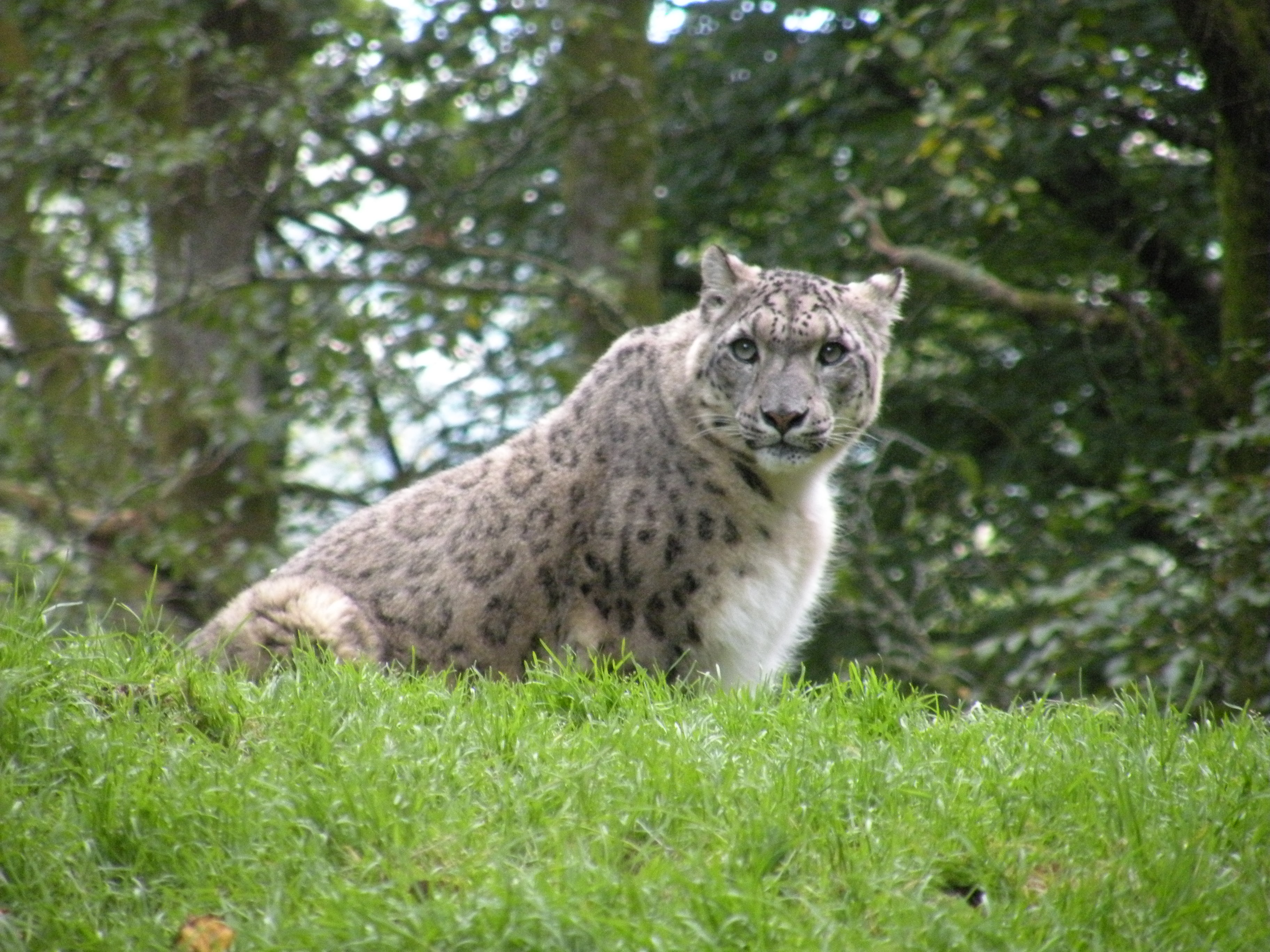
Snow leopard in Zoo of Jurques

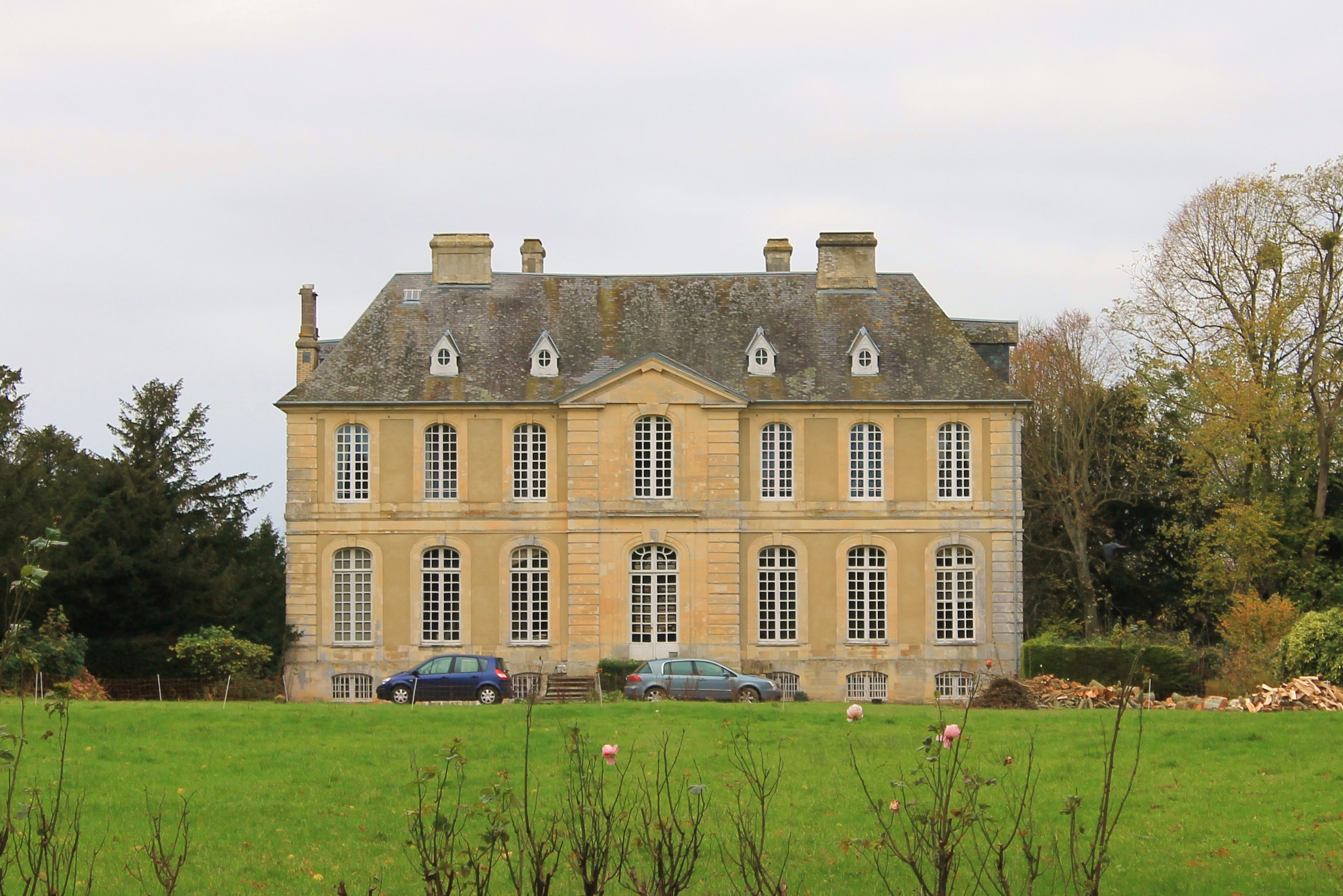
Castle in Monts-en-Bessin
