= Amayé-sur-Seulles =

- Commune
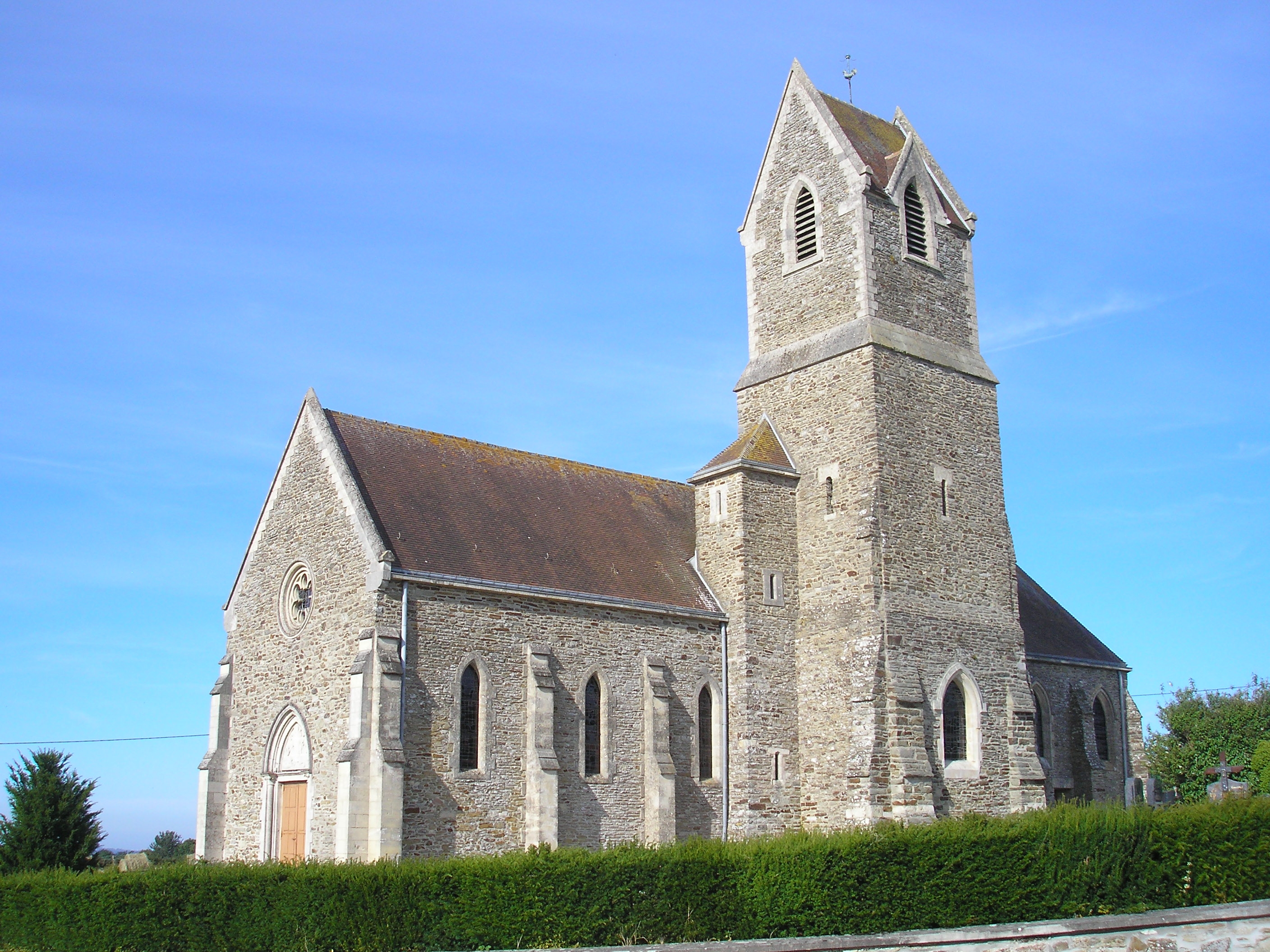
- The church in Amayé-sur-Seulles

- Coat of arms
- Location of Amayé-sur-Seulles
- Location within France Location within Normandy
- Coordinates: 49°04′51″N 0°42′47″W
- Country: France
- Region: Normandy
- Department: Calvados
- Arrondissement: Vire
- Canton: Les Monts d'Aunay
- Intercommunality: Pré-Bocage Intercom

Government
  - Mayor (2020–2026): Pascal Cotard
- Area^{1}: 5.62 km^{2} (2.17 sq mi)
- Elevation: 160 m (520 ft)
- Highest elevation: 194 m (636 ft)
- Lowest elevation: 91 m (299 ft)
- Population (2023): 215
  - Density: 38.3/km^{2} (99.1/sq mi)
- Time zone: UTC+01:00 (CET)
  - Summer (DST): UTC+02:00 (CEST)
- INSEE/Postal code: 14007 /14310
- ^{1} French Land Register data, which excludes lakes, ponds, glaciers > 1 km^{2} (0.386 sq mi or 247 acres) and river estuaries.

Amayé-sur-Seulles (French pronunciation: [amaje syʁ sœl], literally Amayé on Seulles) is a commune in the Calvados department in the Normandy region of northwestern France.

== Geography ==
Amayé-sur-Seulles is located four kilometres west of Villers-Bocage and 20 kilometres south of Bayeux in the Seulles valley. It can be accessed by road D71 coming west from Villers-Bocage through the heart of the commune and village and continuing west to Caumont-l'Evente. The road D193 running west from Cahagnes to Villers-Bocage forms the southern boundary of the commune. The road D215 also starts from the hamlet of Saint-German in the commune and runs south-west to Tracy-Bocage. There are also many small country roads in the commune. In addition to the village there are also the hamlets of Saint-German to the east and La Vallee to the north of the village. The commune consists entirely of farmland.

La Seulles river passes through the northern part of the commune and Le Calichon which forms the northern boundary of the commune flows into it. Another stream which rises near the village flows north forming part of the eastern boundary of the commune and also joins La Seulles. In the south-east the Ruisseau du Caudray forms the south-eastern boundary of the commune and flows eastwards to join La Seulline river. The Ruisseau de Pont Chouquet flows into the Caudray and forms part of the eastern boundary of the commune.

=== Heraldry ===
| Arms of Amayé-sur-Seulles | Blazon: Vert, 3 fesses wavy of argent between 3 cinquefoils of Or 2 and 1.. |

== Administration ==
List of Successive Mayors of Amayé-sur-Seulles

| From | To | Name | Party | Position |
|---|---|---|---|---|
| 1983 | 2001 | Charles Guilbert | SE | Farmer |
| 2001 | 2026 | Pascal Cotard | SE | Farmer |

== Population ==
The inhabitants of the commune are known as Amayéens or Amayéennes in French.

Historical population
| Year | Pop. | ±% p.a. |
|---|---|---|
| 1968 | 195 | — |
| 1975 | 169 | −2.02% |
| 1982 | 185 | +1.30% |
| 1990 | 158 | −1.95% |
| 1999 | 163 | +0.35% |
| 2007 | 190 | +1.93% |
| 2012 | 199 | +0.93% |
| 2017 | 230 | +2.94% |
| 2023 | 215 | −1.12% |
Source: INSEE

== Sites and Monuments ==
- The Church of Saint-Vigor (15th century) belonged to the Abbey of Cerisy. It contains two items which are registered as historical objects:
  - A Statue: Virgin and child (16th century)
  - A Retable: Virgin and child (18th century)
- The Chateau of Bosq (18th century)
- The Clos d'Orval cider farm with an exhibition of old cider-making equipment.

== See also ==
- Communes of the Calvados department
