= Maisoncelles-Pelvey =

- Commune
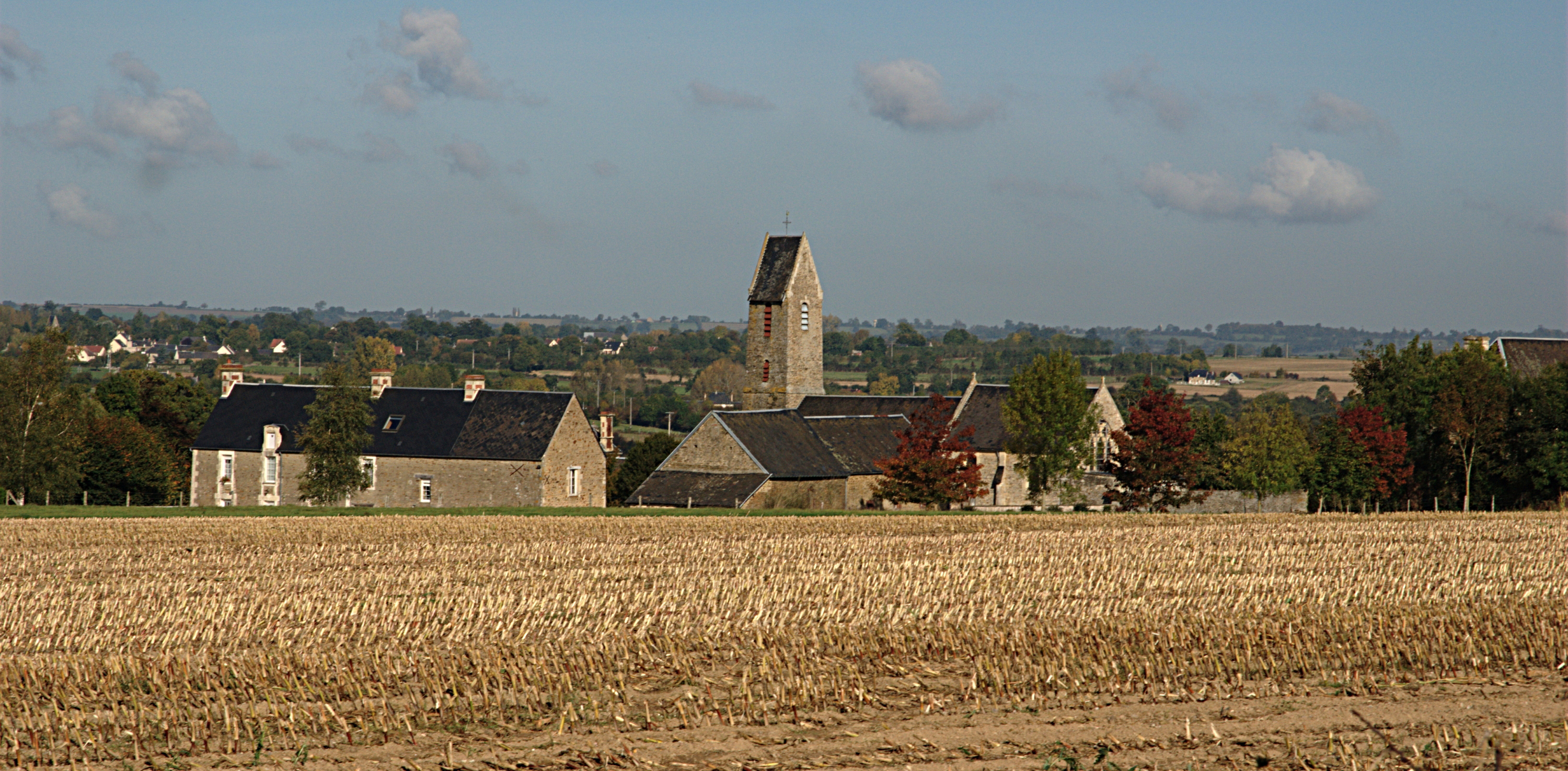
- A general view of Maisoncelles-Pelvey
- Location of Maisoncelles-Pelvey
- Location within France Location within Normandy
- Coordinates: 49°03′28″N 0°40′23″W
- Country: France
- Region: Normandy
- Department: Calvados
- Arrondissement: Vire
- Canton: Les Monts d'Aunay
- Intercommunality: Pré-Bocage Intercom

Government
  - Mayor (2020–2026): Valérie Lefevre
- Area^{1}: 5.40 km^{2} (2.08 sq mi)
- Elevation: 150 m (490 ft)
- Highest elevation: 193 m (633 ft)
- Lowest elevation: 103 m (338 ft)
- Population (2023): 252
  - Density: 46.7/km^{2} (121/sq mi)
- Time zone: UTC+01:00 (CET)
  - Summer (DST): UTC+02:00 (CEST)
- INSEE/Postal code: 14389 /14310
- ^{1} French Land Register data, which excludes lakes, ponds, glaciers > 1 km^{2} (0.386 sq mi or 247 acres) and river estuaries.

Maisoncelles-Pelvey (French pronunciation: [mɛzɔ̃sɛl pɛlvɛ]) is a commune in the Calvados department in the Normandy region in northwestern France.

== Geography ==
The commune is made up of the following collection of villages and hamlets, La Truelle and Maisoncelles-Pelvey.

== Population ==
Historical population
Year	Pop.	±% p.a.
1968	235	—
1975	188	−3.14%
1982	211	+1.66%
1990	203	−0.48%
1999	228	+1.30%
2007	252	+1.26%
2012	264	+0.93%
2017	262	−0.15%
2023	252	−0.65%
Source: INSEE

== See also ==
- Communes of the Calvados department
