= Tracy-Bocage =

- Commune
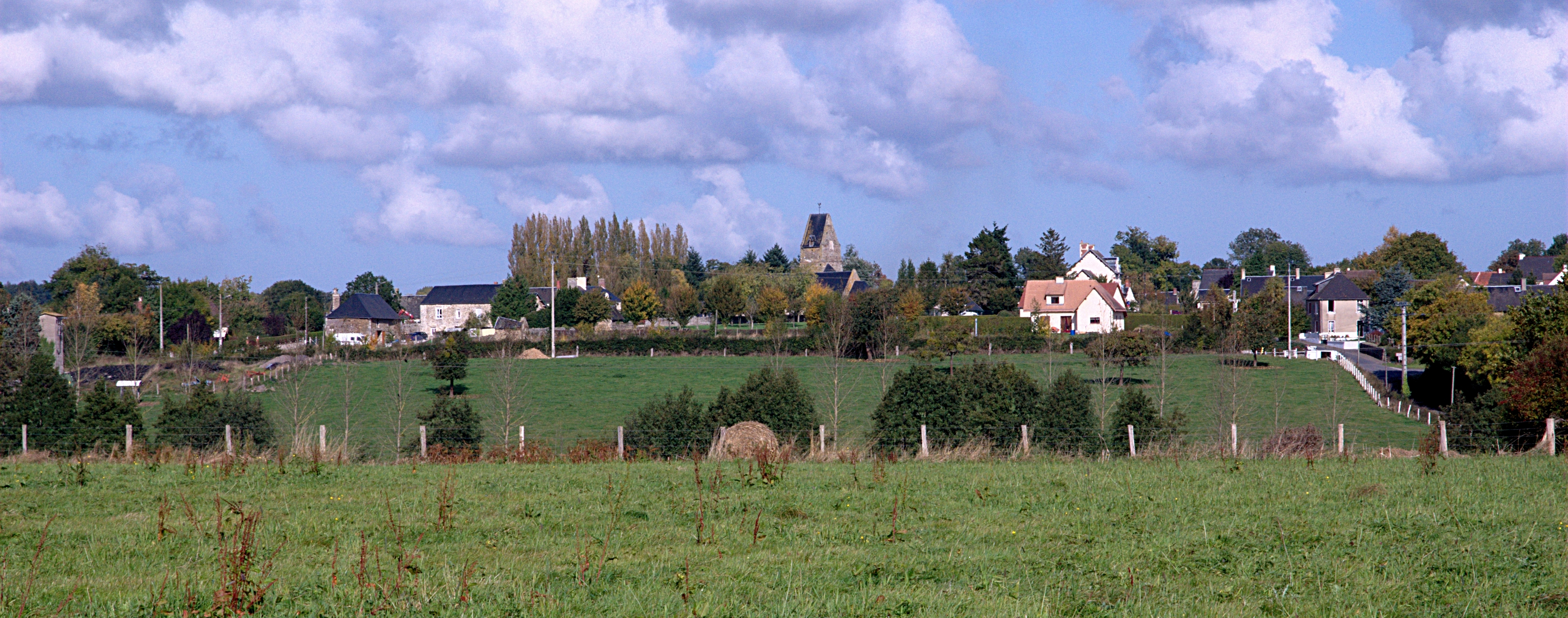
- A general view of Tracy-Bocage
- Location of Tracy-Bocage
- Location within France Location within Normandy
- Coordinates: 49°04′24″N 0°41′24″W
- Country: France
- Region: Normandy
- Department: Calvados
- Arrondissement: Vire
- Canton: Les Monts d'Aunay
- Intercommunality: Pré-Bocage Intercom

Government
  - Mayor (2020–2026): François Repel
- Area^{1}: 5.24 km^{2} (2.02 sq mi)
- Elevation: 137 m (449 ft)
- Highest elevation: 189 m (620 ft)
- Lowest elevation: 95 m (312 ft)
- Population (2023): 312
  - Density: 59.5/km^{2} (154/sq mi)
- Time zone: UTC+01:00 (CET)
  - Summer (DST): UTC+02:00 (CEST)
- INSEE/Postal code: 14708 /14310
- ^{1} French Land Register data, which excludes lakes, ponds, glaciers > 1 km^{2} (0.386 sq mi or 247 acres) and river estuaries.

Tracy-Bocage (French pronunciation: [tʁasi bɔkaʒ]) is a commune in the Calvados department in the Normandy region in northwestern France.

== Population ==
Historical population
Year	Pop.	±% p.a.
1968	206	—
1975	201	−0.35%
1982	244	+2.81%
1990	258	+0.70%
1999	297	+1.58%
2007	342	+1.78%
2012	322	−1.20%
2017	303	−1.21%
2023	312	+0.49%
Source: INSEE

== See also ==
- Communes of the Calvados department
