= Canton of Saint-Sever-Calvados =

Canton of France, disestablished 2015

Coordinates: 48°50′23″N 1°02′53″W

The Canton of Saint-Sever-Calvados (French: Le canton de Saint-Sever-Calvados) is a French former canton of the département of Calvados in the region of Basse-Normandie. It had 7,226 inhabitants (2012). It was disbanded following the French canton reorganisation which came into effect in March 2015. It consisted of 18 communes, which joined the canton of Vire Normandie in 2015. The canton formed part of the Arrondissement of Vire. The chief commune in the Canton was Saint-Sever-Calvados and the general counciller was Yves Rondel (2008 - 2014)

== Geography ==
The altitude varied from 39 m (Pont-Farcy) to 351 m (Le Gast), the average altitude was 186 m.

== Communes ==
The Canton comprised the following Communes:

- Beaumesnil
- Campagnolles
- Champ-du-Boult
- Courson
- Fontenermont
- Le Gast
- Landelles-et-Coupigny
- Le Mesnil-Benoist
- Le Mesnil-Caussois
- Mesnil-Clinchamps
- Le Mesnil-Robert
- Pont-Bellanger
- Pont-Farcy
- Saint-Aubin-des-Bois
- Saint-Manvieu-Bocage
- Sainte-Marie-Outre-l'Eau
- Saint-Sever-Calvados
- Sept-Frères
