= Sainte-Marie-Outre-l'Eau =

- Commune
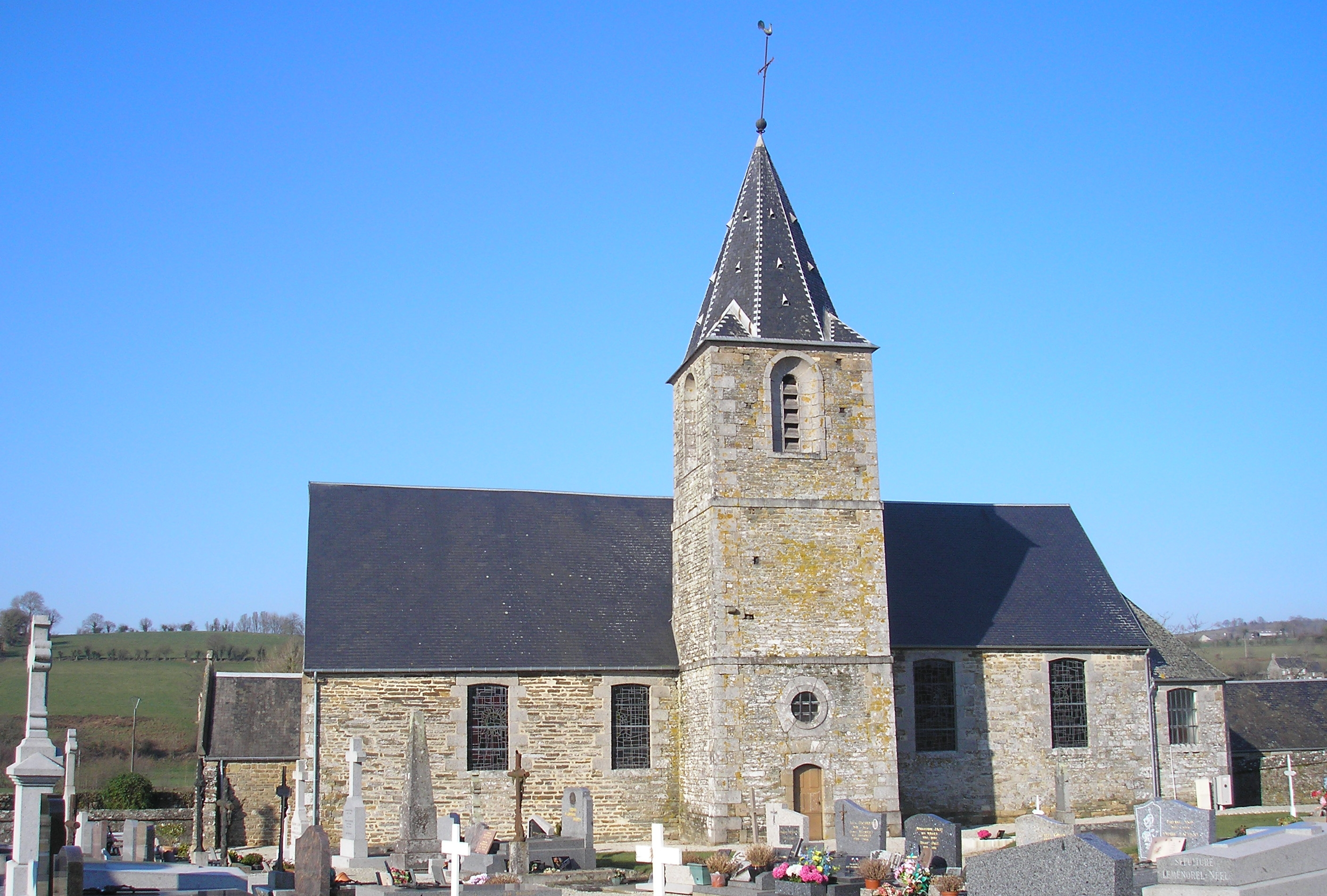
- The church in Sainte-Marie-Outre-l'Eau

- Coat of arms
- Location of Sainte-Marie-Outre-l'Eau
- Location within France Location within Normandy
- Coordinates: 48°56′11″N 1°01′22″W
- Country: France
- Region: Normandy
- Department: Calvados
- Arrondissement: Vire
- Canton: Vire Normandie
- Intercommunality: Intercom de la Vire au Noireau

Government
  - Mayor (2020–2026): Catherine Garnier
- Area^{1}: 5.75 km^{2} (2.22 sq mi)
- Elevation: 65 m (213 ft)
- Highest elevation: 192 m (630 ft)
- Lowest elevation: 46 m (151 ft)
- Population (2023): 124
  - Density: 21.6/km^{2} (55.9/sq mi)
- Time zone: UTC+01:00 (CET)
  - Summer (DST): UTC+02:00 (CEST)
- INSEE/Postal code: 14619 /14380
- ^{1} French Land Register data, which excludes lakes, ponds, glaciers > 1 km^{2} (0.386 sq mi or 247 acres) and river estuaries.

Sainte-Marie-Outre-l'Eau is a commune in the Calvados department in the Normandy region in northwestern France. The name roughly translates as Saint Mary beyond the Water.

It is likely that some of the families who settled in Cheshire after 1066 came from the area.[3]

== Geography ==
The village is located approximately 1 kilometre east from Pont-Farcy, on the left bank of the river Vire. The village is a collection of farm houses and a church. The overall population is 85 (in 2008), including outlying farms. Other nearby communes include Pont-Bellanger and Beaumesnil. The nearest large towns are Villedieu-les-Poeles and Vire.

The village is located close to the Calvados tourist attraction Grotte de Bion

== Population ==
Historical population
Year	Pop.	±% p.a.
1968	224	—
1975	149	−5.66%
1982	119	−3.16%
1990	106	−1.44%
1999	81	−2.94%
2007	89	+1.18%
2012	94	+1.10%
2017	123	+5.53%
2023	124	+0.14%
Source: INSEE

== See also ==
- Communes of the Calvados department
