= Sept Frères =

Sept Frères may refer to:

- Sept-Frères, a commune in France
- Seven Brothers (islands), also known as Les Sept Frères, located in Djibouti
