= Communauté de communes Intercom de la Vire au Noireau =

Federation of municipalities in Lower Normandy, France

Intercom de la Vire au Noireau
- Communauté de communes
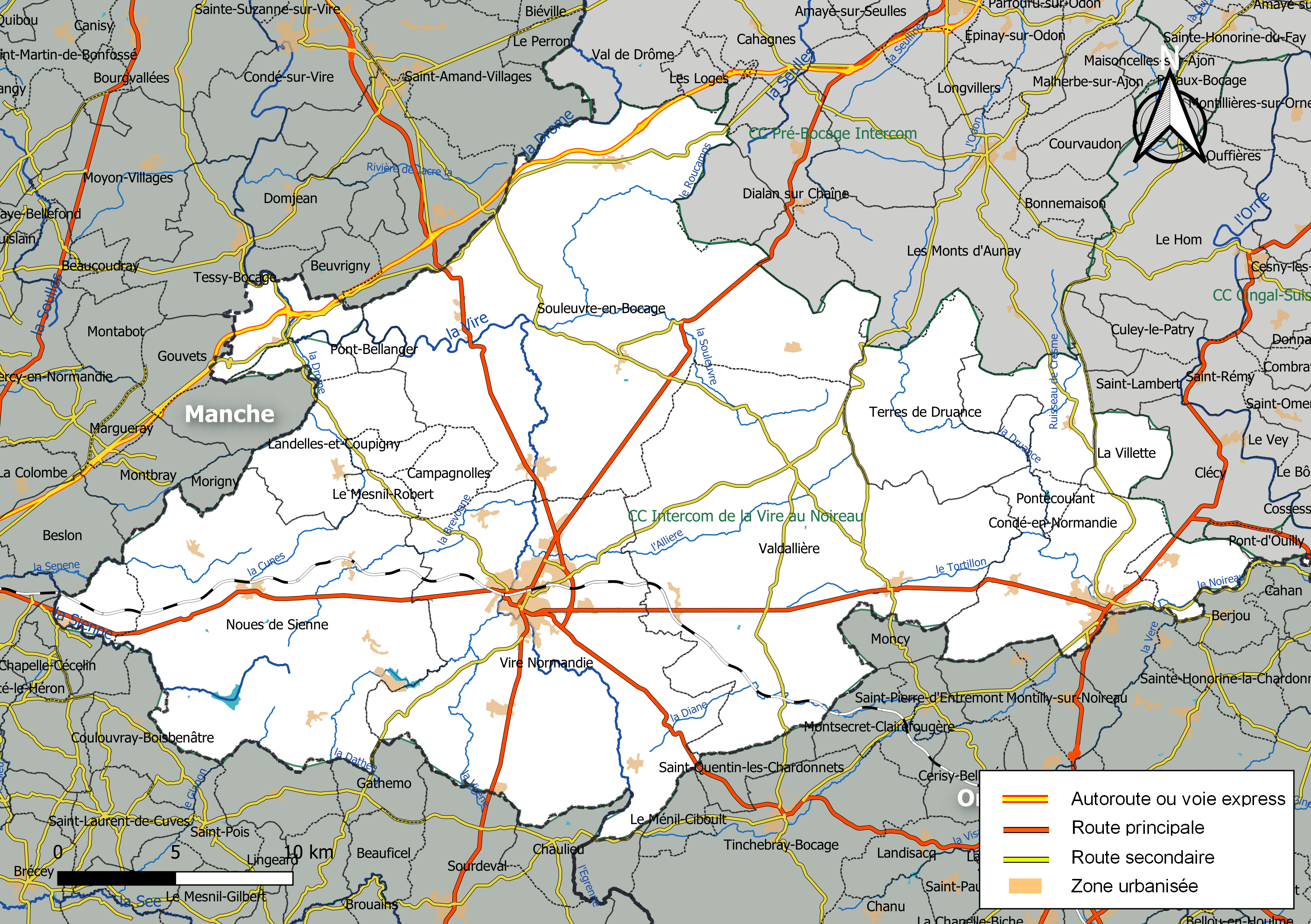
- Map of the communes
- Country: France
- Region: Normandy
- Department: Calvados
- No. of communes: {{{nbcomm}}}
- Established: January 2017

Government
  - President: Marc Andreu Sabater
- Area: 789 km^{2} (305 sq mi)
- Population (2019): 46,362
  - Density: 58.8/km^{2} (152/sq mi)
- Website: www.vireaunoireau.fr

The Communauté de communes Intercom de la Vire au Noireau is a federation of municipalities (communauté de communes) in the Calvados département and in the Normandy région of France. Its seat is Vire Normandie. Its area is 789 km^{2}, and its population in 2019 was 46,362. It covers some of the Communes that make up the area known as Suisse Normande.

== Composition ==
The communauté de communes consists of the following 17 communes:

1. Beaumesnil
2. Campagnolles
3. Condé-en-Normandie
4. Landelles-et-Coupigny
5. La Villette
6. Le Mesnil-Robert
7. Noues de Sienne
8. Périgny
9. Pont-Bellanger
10. Pontécoulant
11. Saint-Aubin-des-Bois
12. Saint-Denis-de-Méré
13. Sainte-Marie-Outre-l'Eau
14. Souleuvre en Bocage
15. Terres de Druance
16. Valdallière
17. Vire Normandie
