= Mesnil-Clinchamps =

- Part of Noues de Sienne
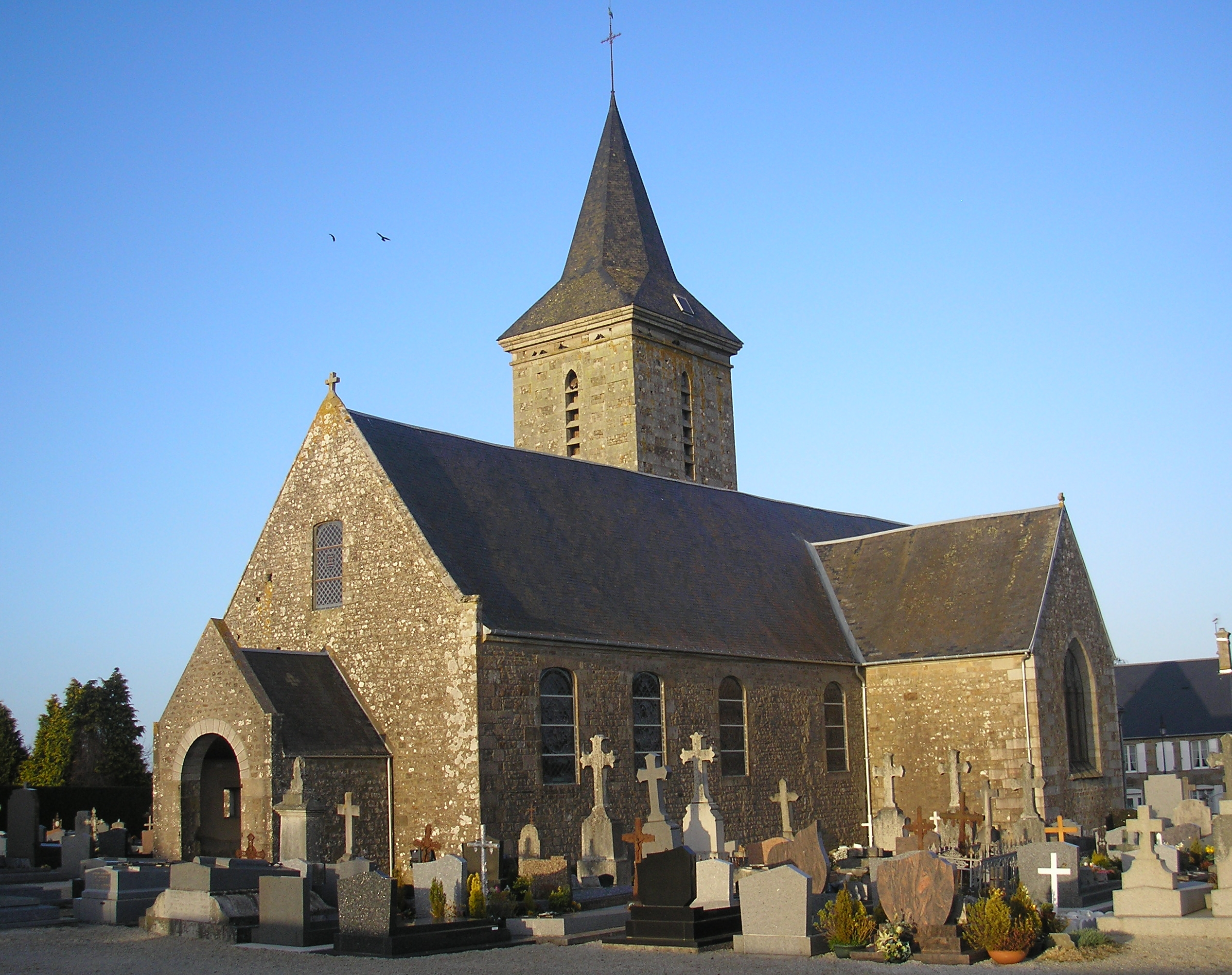
- Saint Martin
- Location of Mesnil-Clinchamps
- Location within France Location within Normandy
- Coordinates: 48°51′13″N 0°59′21″W
- Country: France
- Region: Normandy
- Department: Calvados
- Arrondissement: Vire
- Canton: Vire Normandie
- Commune: Noues de Sienne
- Area^{1}: 15.33 km^{2} (5.92 sq mi)
- Elevation: 180 m (590 ft)
- Highest elevation: 232 m (761 ft)
- Lowest elevation: 111 m (364 ft)
- Population (2023): 905
  - Density: 59.0/km^{2} (153/sq mi)
- Time zone: UTC+01:00 (CET)
  - Summer (DST): UTC+02:00 (CEST)
- Postal code: 14380
- ^{1} French Land Register data, which excludes lakes, ponds, glaciers > 1 km^{2} (0.386 sq mi or 247 acres) and river estuaries.

Mesnil-Clinchamps (French pronunciation: [mɛnil klɛ̃ʃɑ̃]) is a former commune in the Calvados department in the Normandy region in northwestern France. On 1 January 2017, it was merged into the new commune Noues de Sienne.

== See also ==
- Communes of the Calvados department
