= Le Mesnil-Caussois =

- Part of Noues de Sienne
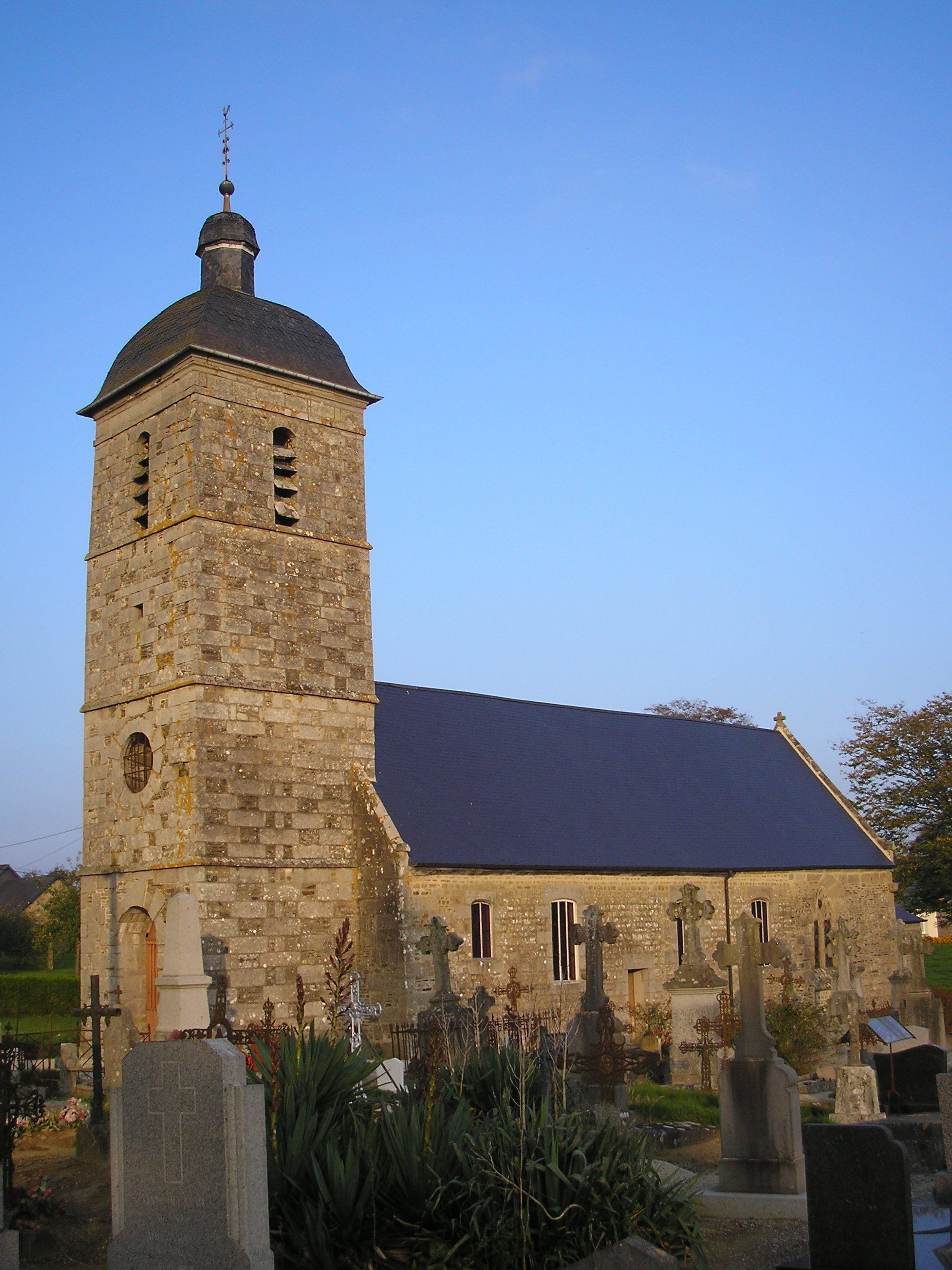
- Saint Pierre
- Location of Le Mesnil-Caussois
- Location within France Location within Normandy
- Coordinates: 48°52′04″N 0°59′01″W
- Country: France
- Region: Normandy
- Department: Calvados
- Arrondissement: Vire
- Canton: Vire Normandie
- Commune: Noues de Sienne
- Area^{1}: 4.22 km^{2} (1.63 sq mi)
- Elevation: 140 m (460 ft)
- Highest elevation: 167 m (548 ft)
- Lowest elevation: 87 m (285 ft)
- Population (2023): 111
  - Density: 26.3/km^{2} (68.1/sq mi)
- Time zone: UTC+01:00 (CET)
  - Summer (DST): UTC+02:00 (CEST)
- Postal code: 14380
- ^{1} French Land Register data, which excludes lakes, ponds, glaciers > 1 km^{2} (0.386 sq mi or 247 acres) and river estuaries.

Le Mesnil-Caussois (French pronunciation: [lə mɛnil koswa]) is a former commune in the Calvados department in the Normandy region in northwestern France. On 1 January 2017, it was merged into the new commune Noues de Sienne.

== See also ==
- Communes of the Calvados department
