= Le Gast =

- Part of Noues de Sienne
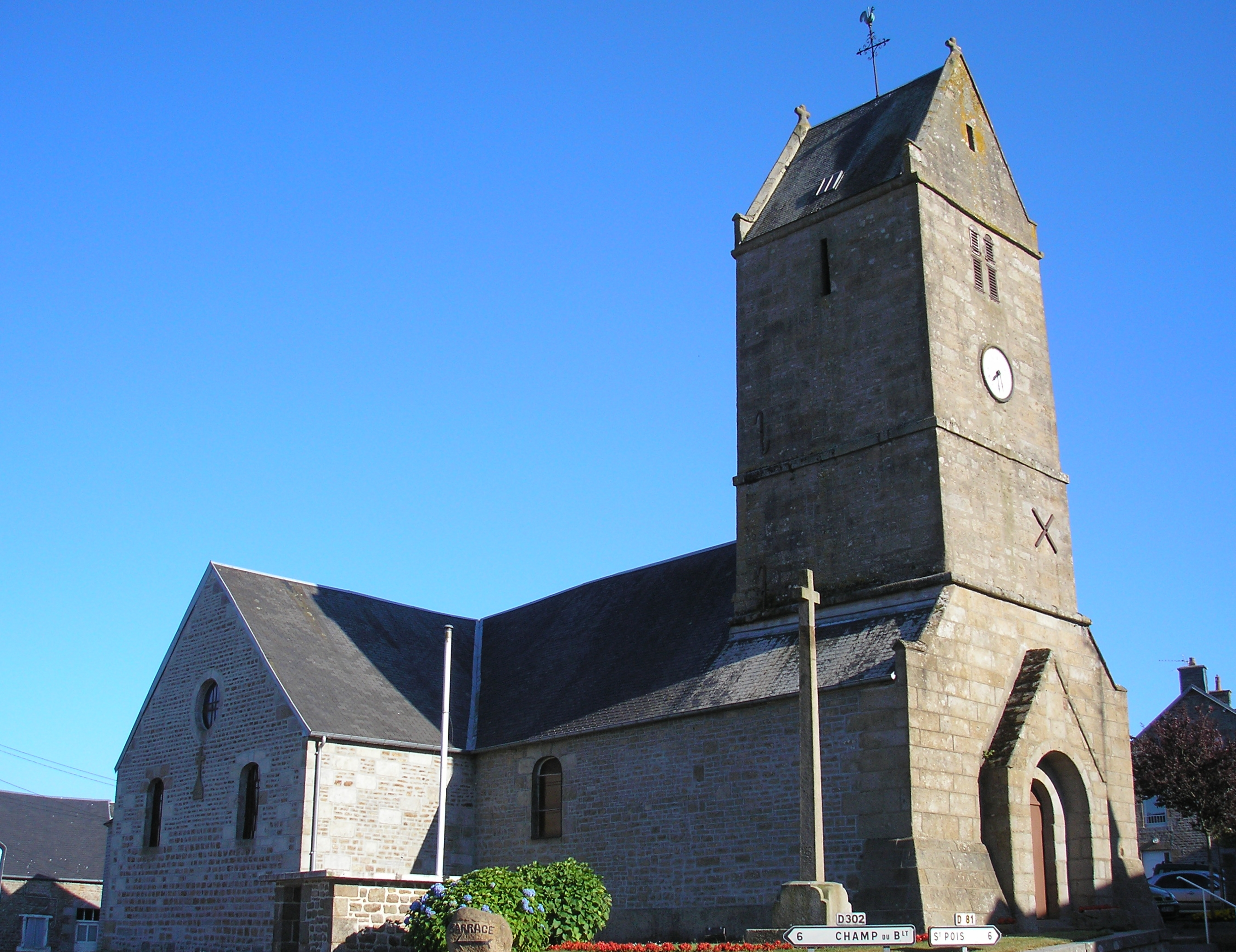
- Location of Le Gast
- Location within France Location within Normandy
- Coordinates: 48°47′48″N 1°04′30″W
- Country: France
- Region: Normandy
- Department: Calvados
- Arrondissement: Vire
- Canton: Vire Normandie
- Commune: Noues de Sienne
- Area^{1}: 12.74 km^{2} (4.92 sq mi)
- Elevation: 220 m (720 ft)
- Highest elevation: 347 m (1,138 ft)
- Lowest elevation: 202 m (663 ft)
- Population (2023): 164
  - Density: 12.9/km^{2} (33.3/sq mi)
- Time zone: UTC+01:00 (CET)
  - Summer (DST): UTC+02:00 (CEST)
- Postal code: 14380
- ^{1} French Land Register data, which excludes lakes, ponds, glaciers > 1 km^{2} (0.386 sq mi or 247 acres) and river estuaries.

Le Gast (French pronunciation: [lə ɡa]) is a former commune in the Calvados department in the Normandy region in northwestern France. On 1 January 2017, it was merged into the new commune Noues de Sienne.

== See also ==
- Communes of the Calvados department
