= Courson =

- Part of Noues de Sienne
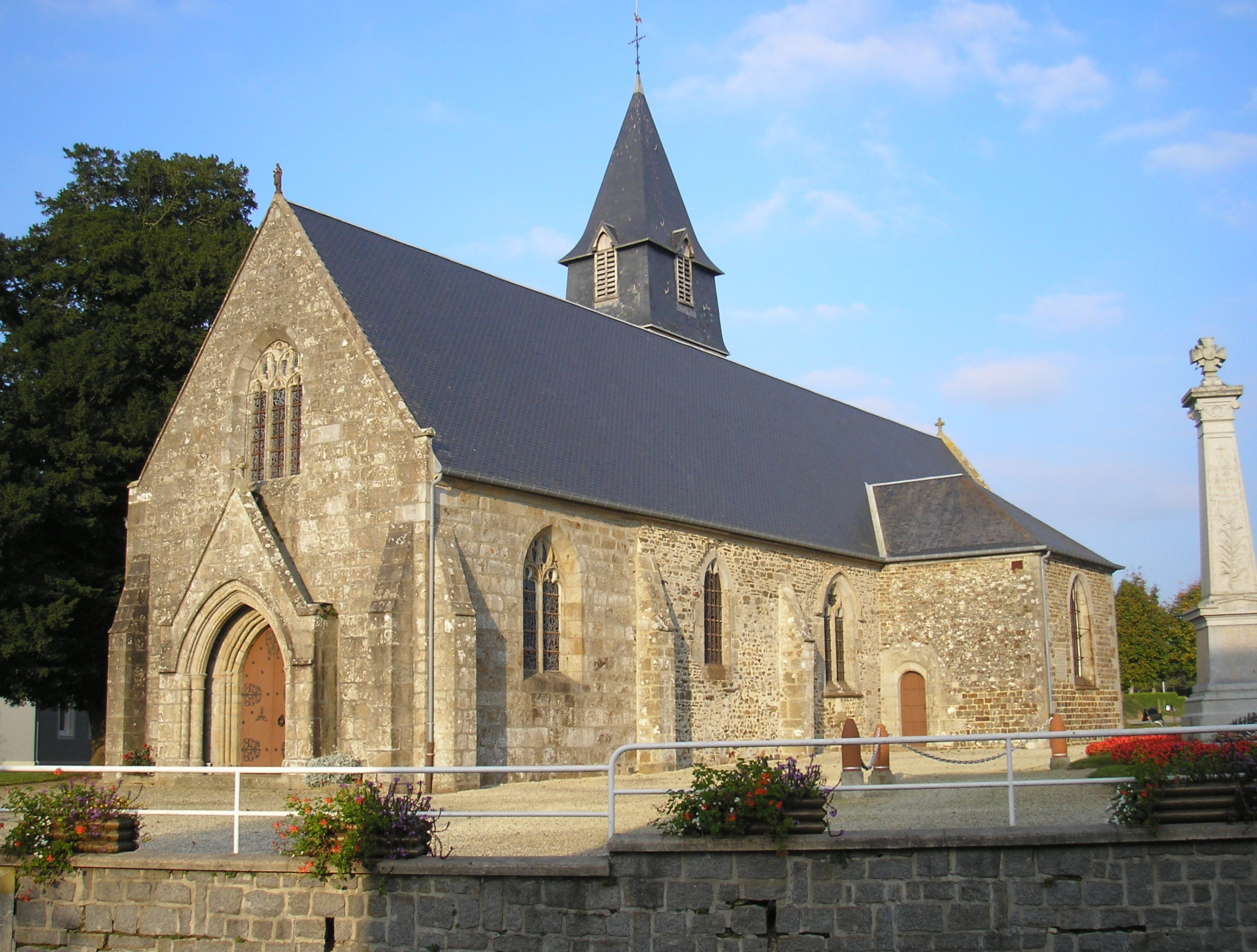
- Location of Courson
- Location within France Location within Normandy
- Coordinates: 48°51′16″N 1°04′48″W
- Country: France
- Region: Normandy
- Department: Calvados
- Arrondissement: Vire
- Canton: Vire Normandie
- Commune: Noues de Sienne
- Area^{1}: 16.7 km^{2} (6.4 sq mi)
- Elevation: 170 m (560 ft)
- Highest elevation: 231 m (758 ft)
- Lowest elevation: 94 m (308 ft)
- Population (2023): 379
  - Density: 22.7/km^{2} (58.8/sq mi)
- Time zone: UTC+01:00 (CET)
  - Summer (DST): UTC+02:00 (CEST)
- Postal code: 14380
- ^{1} French Land Register data, which excludes lakes, ponds, glaciers > 1 km^{2} (0.386 sq mi or 247 acres) and river estuaries.

Courson (French pronunciation: [kuʁsɔ̃]) is a former commune in the Calvados department in the Normandy region in northwestern France. On January 1, 2017, it was merged into the new commune Noues de Sienne.

== See also ==
- Communes of the Calvados department
