= Saint-Sever-Calvados =

- Part of Noues de Sienne
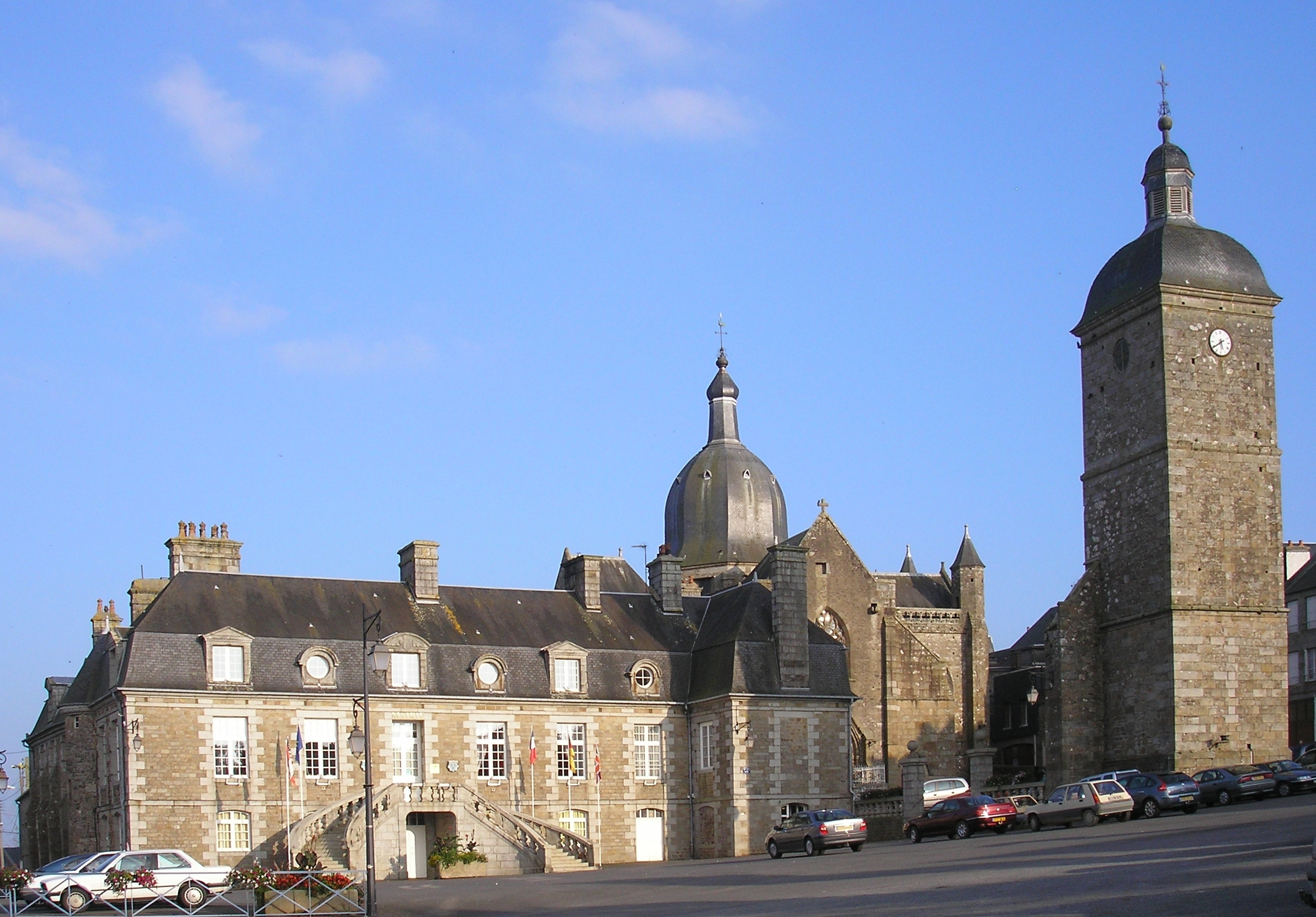

- Coat of arms
- Location of Saint-Sever-Calvados
- Location within France Location within Normandy
- Coordinates: 48°50′28″N 1°02′47″W
- Country: France
- Region: Normandy
- Department: Calvados
- Arrondissement: Vire
- Canton: Vire Normandie
- Commune: Noues de Sienne
- Area^{1}: 27.92 km^{2} (10.78 sq mi)
- Elevation: 243 m (797 ft)
- Highest elevation: 350 m (1,150 ft)
- Lowest elevation: 144 m (472 ft)
- Population (2022): 1,226
  - Density: 43.91/km^{2} (113.7/sq mi)
- Time zone: UTC+01:00 (CET)
  - Summer (DST): UTC+02:00 (CEST)
- Postal code: 14380
- ^{1} French Land Register data, which excludes lakes, ponds, glaciers > 1 km^{2} (0.386 sq mi or 247 acres) and river estuaries.

Saint-Sever-Calvados (French pronunciation: [sɛ̃ səvɛʁ kalvados]) is a former commune in the Calvados department in the Normandy region in northwestern France. On 1 January 2017, it was merged into the new commune Noues de Sienne.

== Geography ==
The former French commune covered 2,792 hectares, with a high proportion of it being the Saint-Sever forest. The Saint-Sever forest is the source of two rivers, the river Vire and the river Siena. Lorencières, at the south of the area is highest point at about 350 metres, and the lowest, in the north east area at about 144 metres. The south of the area is on the granite massif of Vire-Carolles, and the north on the schistous basement of the Bocage virois basin. The average rainfall is 1,150 mm.

The places within the area are la Bersairie, les Déserts, la Braiserie, Saint-Blaise, la Caverie, les Broderies, la Lande, le Bourg (au nord), la Guertière, la Guibellière, la Bunoudière, la Basse Fosse, la Haute Fosse, le Mouton, les Houlettes, le Beauregard, la Maquellerie, le Souchet, la Jourdanière, les Closets, le Vieux Château, le Clos, la Clairière, la Davière, la Faverie, la Jardière, la Rigoussière, la Quetterie, la Nellerie, la Vermondière, la Clergerie (à l'est), la Tournerie, le Mesnil, la Mennetière, la Jancellière, la Capucière, les Lorencières, la Noue de Sienne, l'Ermitage (au sud), le Valet, Brundou, la Jouardière, la Reinière, la Guermonderie, la Pédevinière, les Rivages, Cotigny, Plate Bourse, le Clos du Pôt, la Fieffe, la Porte de Cotigny, la Gablerie, le Bois de Cotigny, le Courbillon (à l'ouest) and le Richelieu

The town of Saint-Sever-Calvados is 13 km west of Vire and 14 km east of Villedieu-les-Poêles and is on a major road between those locations.

== Population ==
Historical population

Year	Pop.	±% p.a.
1793	1,539	—
1800	1,527	−0.11%
1806	1,512	−0.16%
1821	1,515	+0.01%
1831	1,653	+0.88%
1836	1,685	+0.38%
1841	1,658	−0.32%
1846	1,608	−0.61%
1851	1,630	+0.27%
1856	1,551	−0.99%
1861	1,507	−0.57%
1866	1,517	+0.13%
1872	1,526	+0.10%
1876	1,540	+0.23%
1881	1,554	+0.18%
1886	1,514	−0.52%
1891	1,512	−0.03%

Year	Pop.	±% p.a.
1896	1,338	−2.42%
1901	1,387	+0.72%
1906	1,456	+0.98%
1911	1,472	+0.22%
1921	1,335	−0.97%
1926	1,400	+0.96%
1931	1,539	+1.91%
1936	1,704	+2.06%
1946	1,680	−0.14%
1954	1,566	−0.87%
1962	1,485	−0.66%
1968	1,415	−0.80%
1975	1,379	−0.37%
1982	1,425	+0.47%
1990	1,409	−0.14%
1999	1,325	−0.68%
2022	1,226	−0.34%

Source: EHESS and INSEE

== International relations ==
The commune is twinned with:

- Niederdorfelden, Germany since 1973.

== See also ==
- Communes of the Calvados department
- History of Saint Sever and the religious community he started in the forest - with images
