= Le Mesnil-Benoist =

- Part of Noues de Sienne
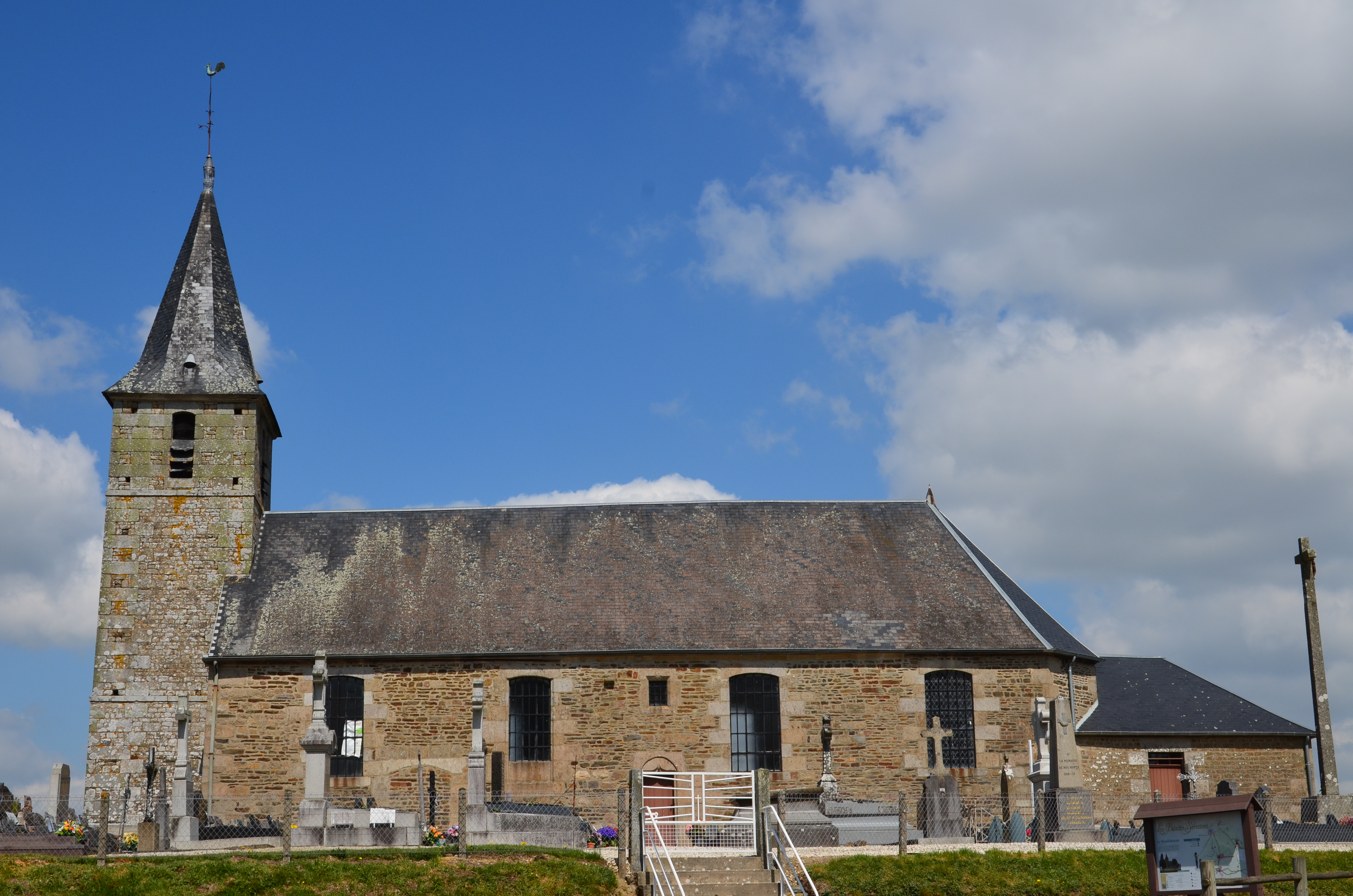
- Location of Le Mesnil-Benoist
- Location within France Location within Normandy
- Coordinates: 48°52′04″N 0°59′01″W
- Country: France
- Region: Normandy
- Department: Calvados
- Arrondissement: Vire
- Canton: Vire Normandie
- Commune: Noues de Sienne
- Area^{1}: 2.62 km^{2} (1.01 sq mi)
- Elevation: 121 m (397 ft)
- Highest elevation: 167 m (548 ft)
- Lowest elevation: 87 m (285 ft)
- Population (2023): 48
  - Density: 18/km^{2} (47/sq mi)
- Time zone: UTC+01:00 (CET)
  - Summer (DST): UTC+02:00 (CEST)
- Postal code: 14380
- ^{1} French Land Register data, which excludes lakes, ponds, glaciers > 1 km^{2} (0.386 sq mi or 247 acres) and river estuaries.

Le Mesnil-Benoist (French pronunciation: [lə mɛnil bənwa]) is a former commune in the Calvados department in the Normandy region in northwestern France. On 1 January 2017, it was merged into the new commune Noues de Sienne.

== See also ==
- Communes of the Calvados department
