= Champ-du-Boult =

- Part of Noues de Sienne
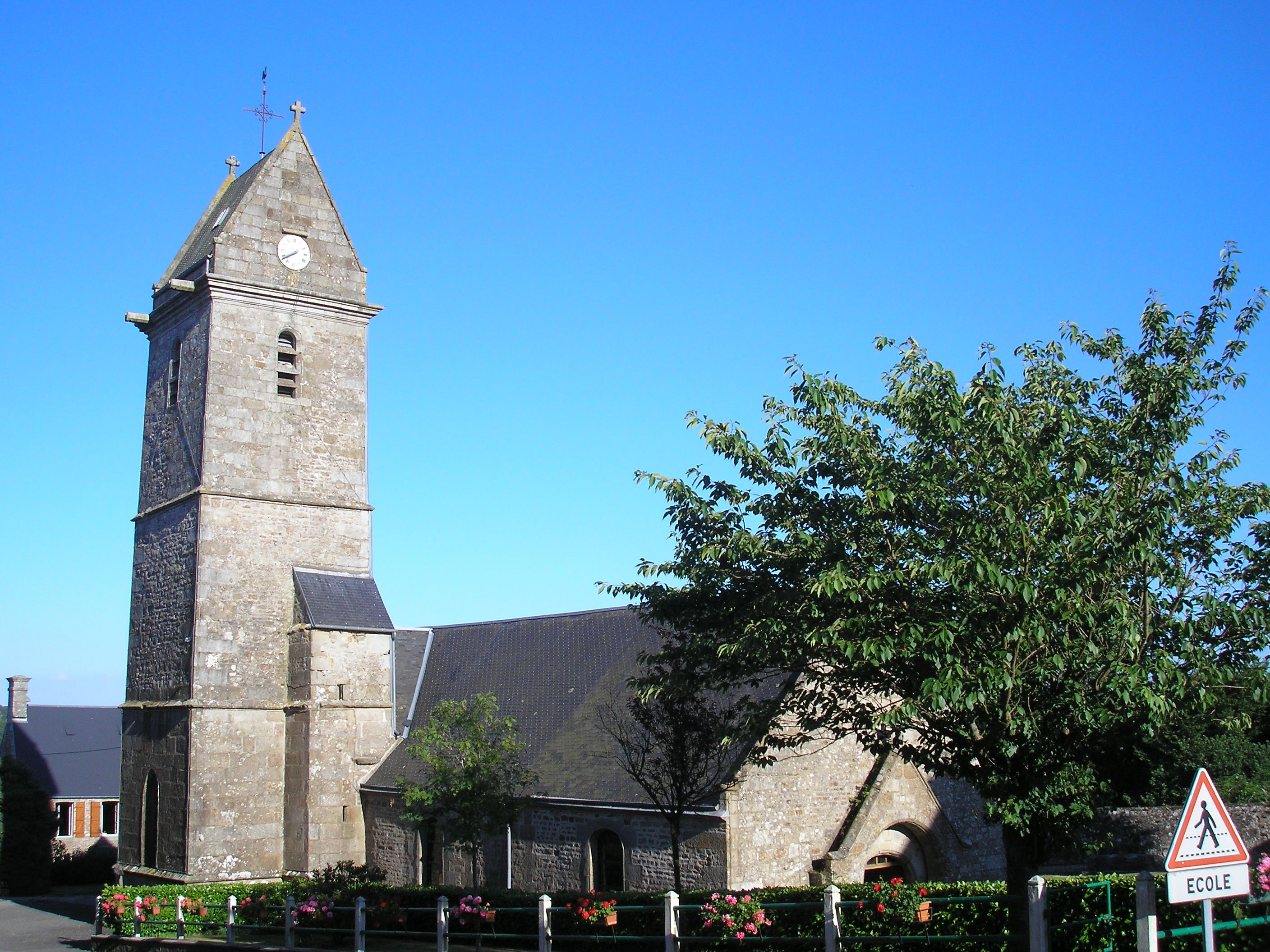
- Notre-Dame church in Champ-du-Boult
- Location of Champ-du-Boult
- Location within France Location within Normandy
- Coordinates: 48°47′38″N 1°00′25″W
- Country: France
- Region: Normandy
- Department: Calvados
- Arrondissement: Vire
- Canton: Vire Normandie
- Commune: Noues de Sienne
- Area^{1}: 13.85 km^{2} (5.35 sq mi)
- Elevation: 309 m (1,014 ft)
- Highest elevation: 351 m (1,152 ft)
- Lowest elevation: 170 m (560 ft)
- Population (2023): 366
  - Density: 26.4/km^{2} (68.4/sq mi)
- Time zone: UTC+01:00 (CET)
  - Summer (DST): UTC+02:00 (CEST)
- Postal code: 14380
- ^{1} French Land Register data, which excludes lakes, ponds, glaciers > 1 km^{2} (0.386 sq mi or 247 acres) and river estuaries.

Champ-du-Boult (French pronunciation: [ʃɑ̃ dy bu]) is a former commune in the Calvados department in the Normandy region in northwestern France. On 1 January 2017, it was merged into the new commune Noues de Sienne.

== See also ==
- Communes of the Calvados department
