= Saint-Denis-de-Méré =

- Commune
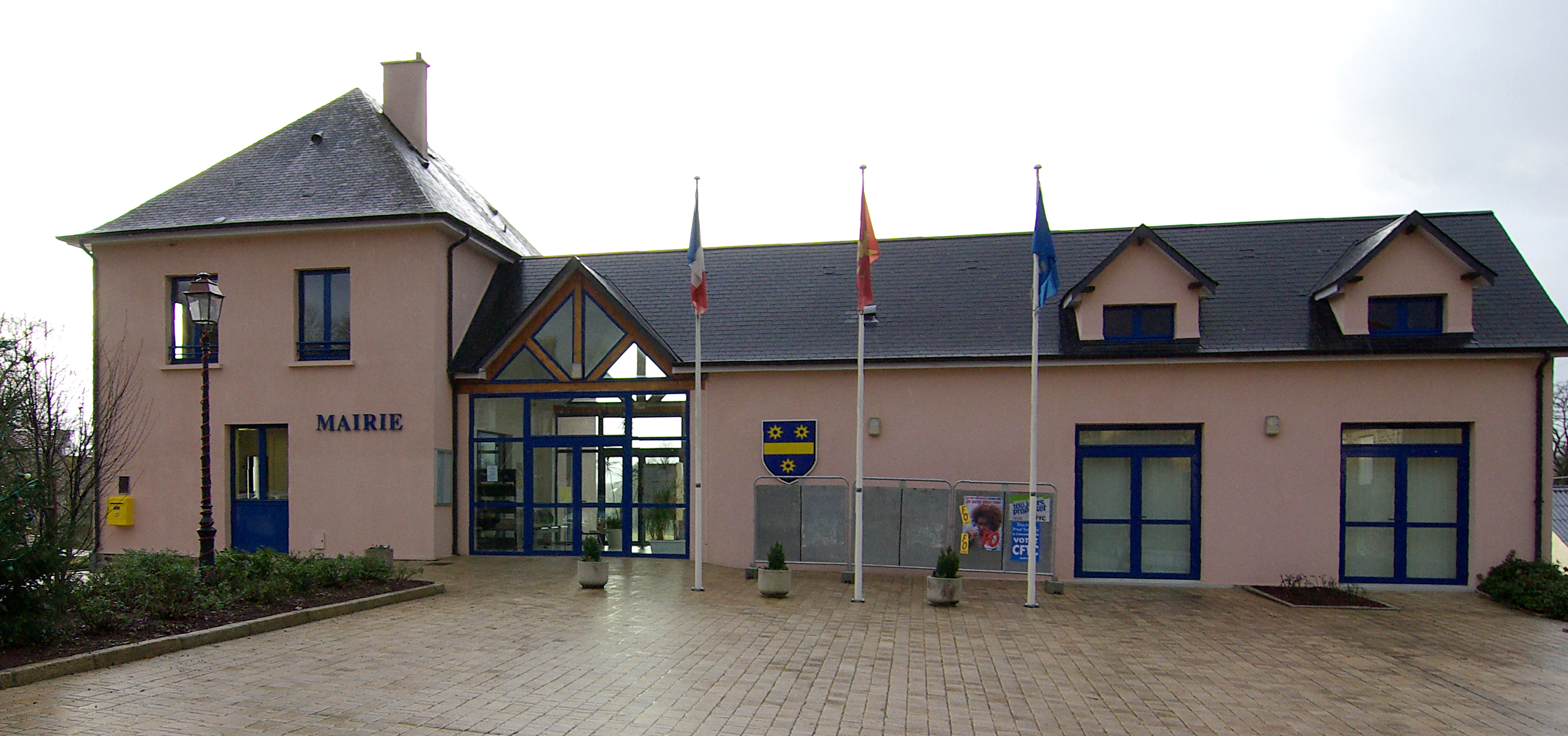
- Town hall

- Coat of arms
- Location of Saint-Denis-de-Méré
- Location within France Location within Normandy
- Coordinates: 48°52′15″N 0°30′54″W
- Country: France
- Region: Normandy
- Department: Calvados
- Arrondissement: Vire
- Canton: Condé-en-Normandie
- Intercommunality: Intercom de la Vire au Noireau

Government
  - Mayor (2020–2026): Manuel Machado
- Area^{1}: 11.37 km^{2} (4.39 sq mi)
- Elevation: 200 m (660 ft)
- Highest elevation: 208 m (682 ft)
- Lowest elevation: 57 m (187 ft)
- Population (2023): 754
  - Density: 66.3/km^{2} (172/sq mi)
- Time zone: UTC+01:00 (CET)
  - Summer (DST): UTC+02:00 (CEST)
- INSEE/Postal code: 14572 /14110
- ^{1} French Land Register data, which excludes lakes, ponds, glaciers > 1 km^{2} (0.386 sq mi or 247 acres) and river estuaries.

Saint-Denis-de-Méré (French pronunciation: [sɛ̃ dəni də meʁe]) is a commune in the Calvados department in the Normandy region in northwestern France.

== Geography ==
The commune is part of the area known as Suisse Normande.

The commune is made up of the following collection of villages and hamlets, Le Val Ozanne, Le Bosq Hue, Le Bosq, Saint-Denis-de-Méré, Le Breuil, Le Jardin, La Coursière, Morieux and Cailly.

The Commune with another 20 communes shares part of a 2,115 hectare, Natura 2000 conservation area, called the Vallée de l'Orne et ses affluents.

Two rivers the Noireau and La Vere are the only watercourses flowing through the commune.

== Population ==
Historical population
Year	Pop.	±% p.a.
1968	759	—
1975	820	+1.11%
1982	925	+1.74%
1990	835	−1.27%
1999	798	−0.50%
2007	824	+0.40%
2012	833	+0.22%
2017	834	+0.02%
2023	754	−1.67%
Source: INSEE

== Points of Interest ==
- La Royauté Arboretum a 7ha Arboretum featuring 150 different species.
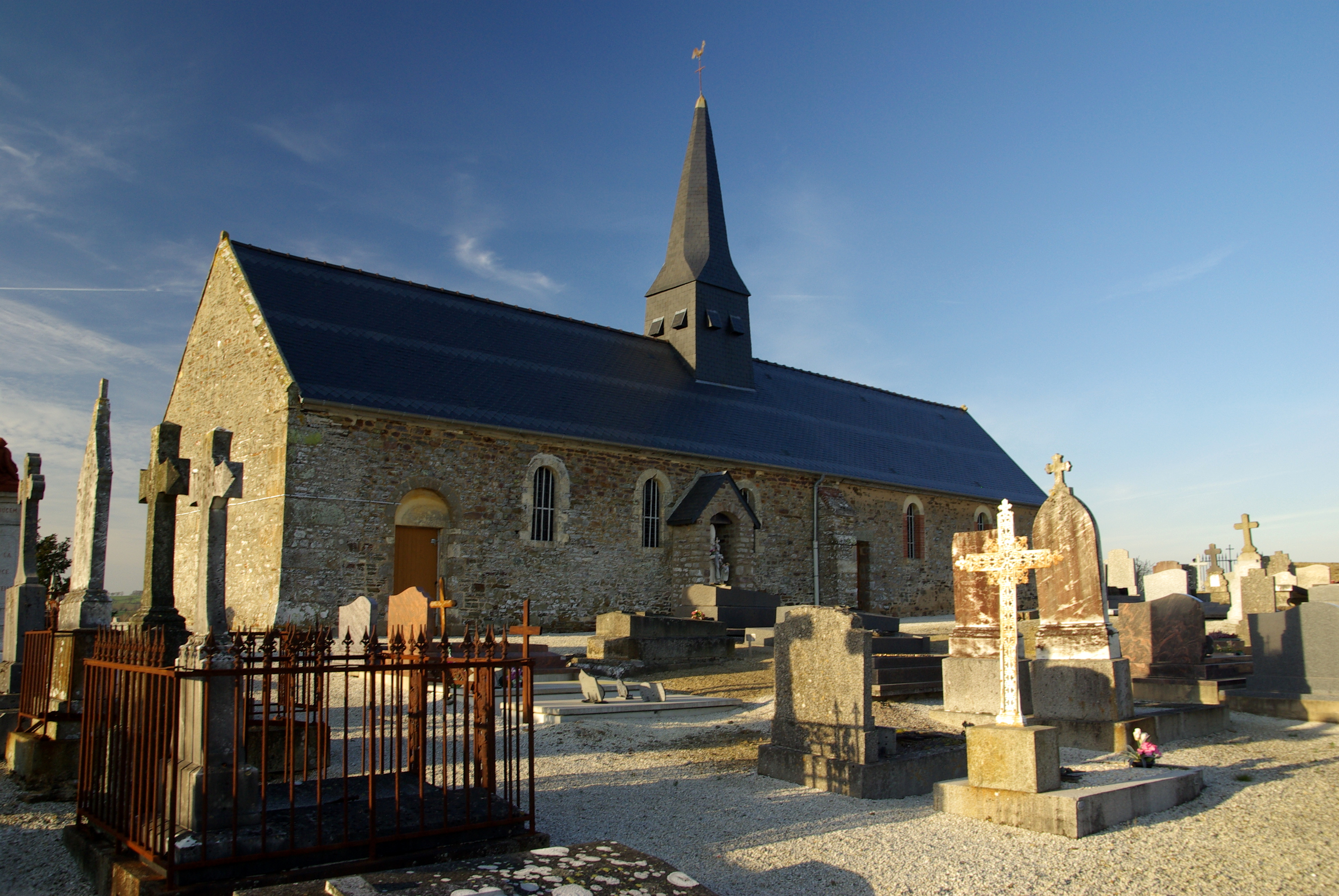
Saint-Denis-de-Méré church

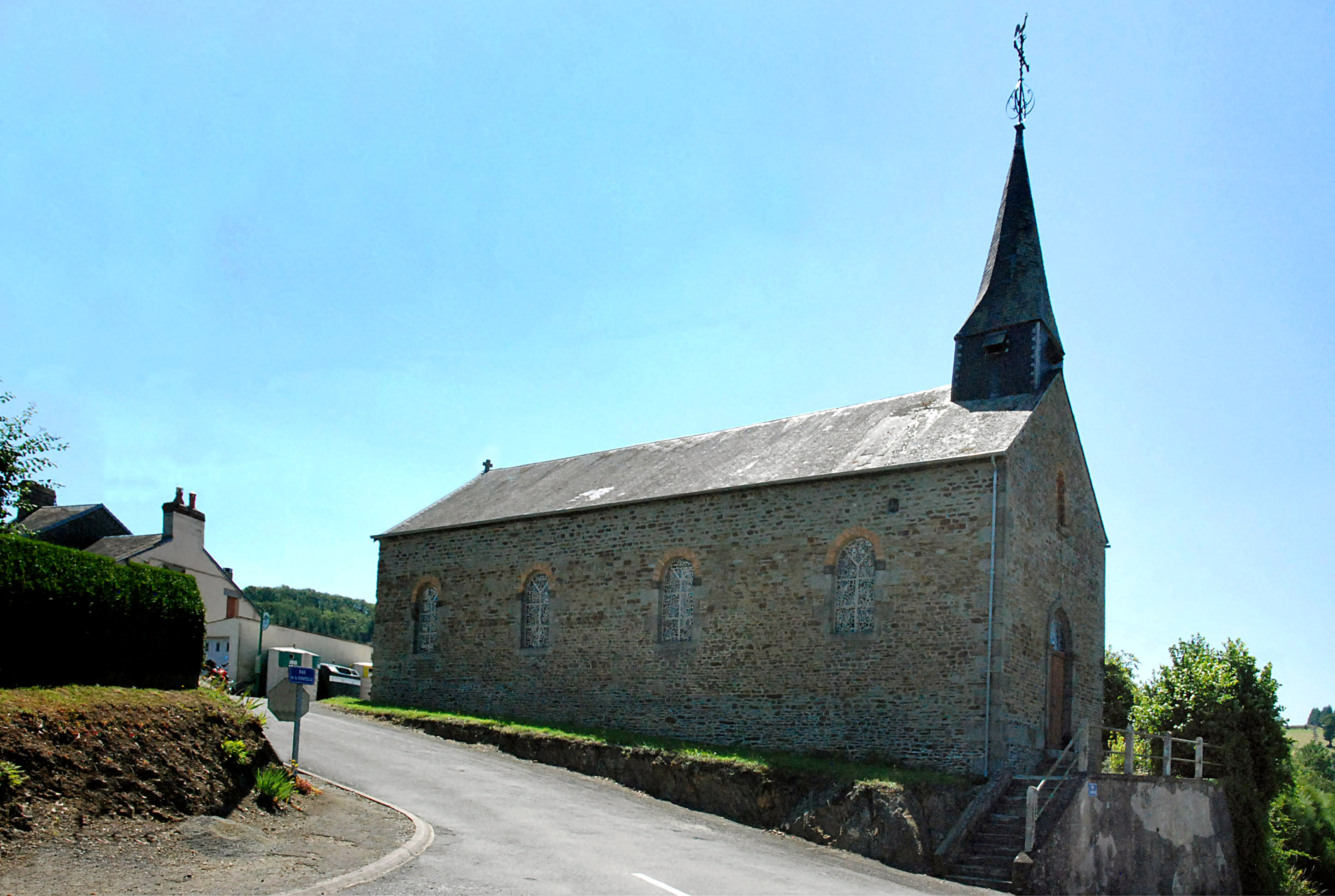
Notre-Dame-des-Vallées Chapelle in Pont-Érambourg

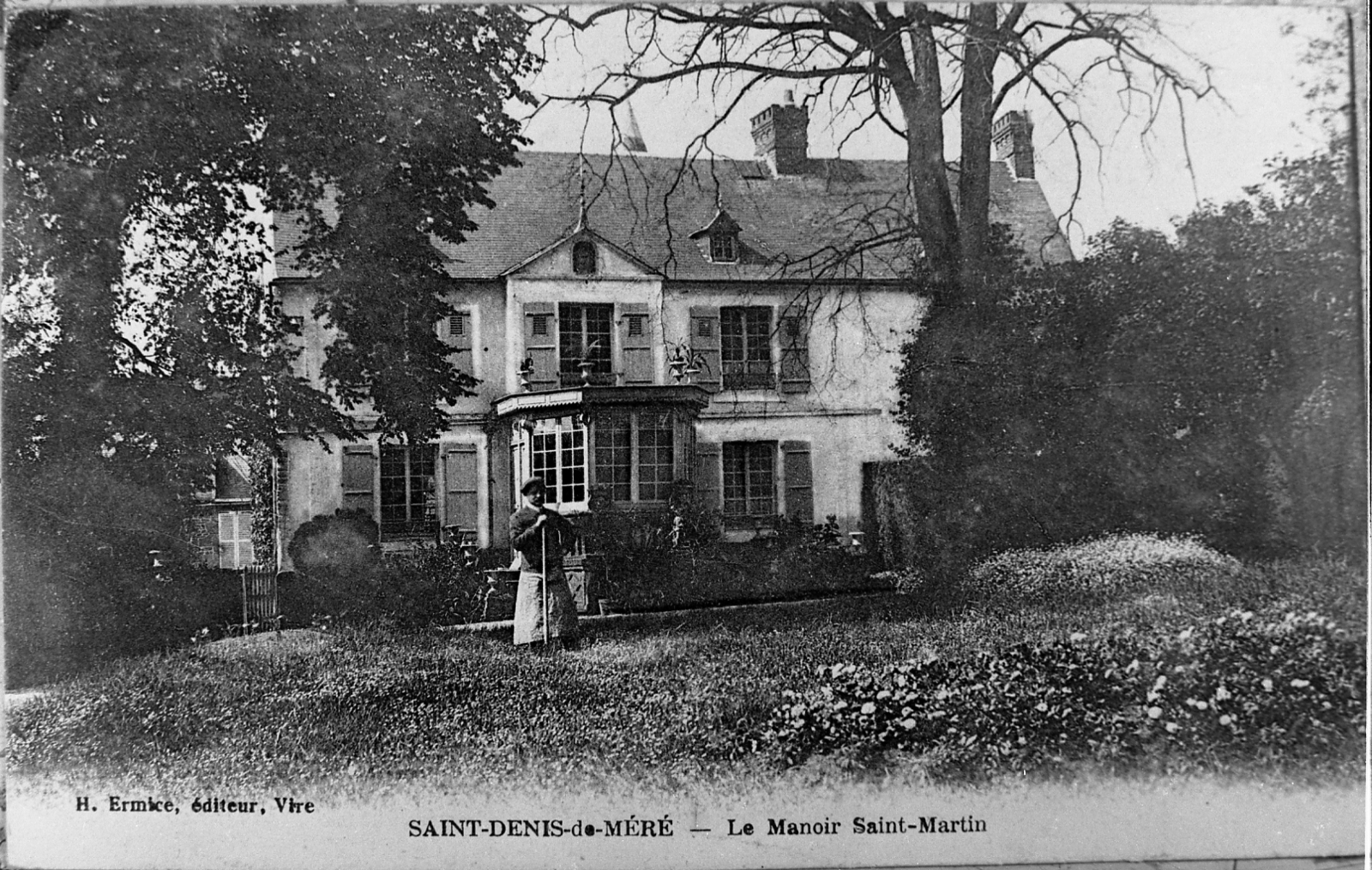
Old postcard showing the Manor house of Saint-Denis-de-Mere

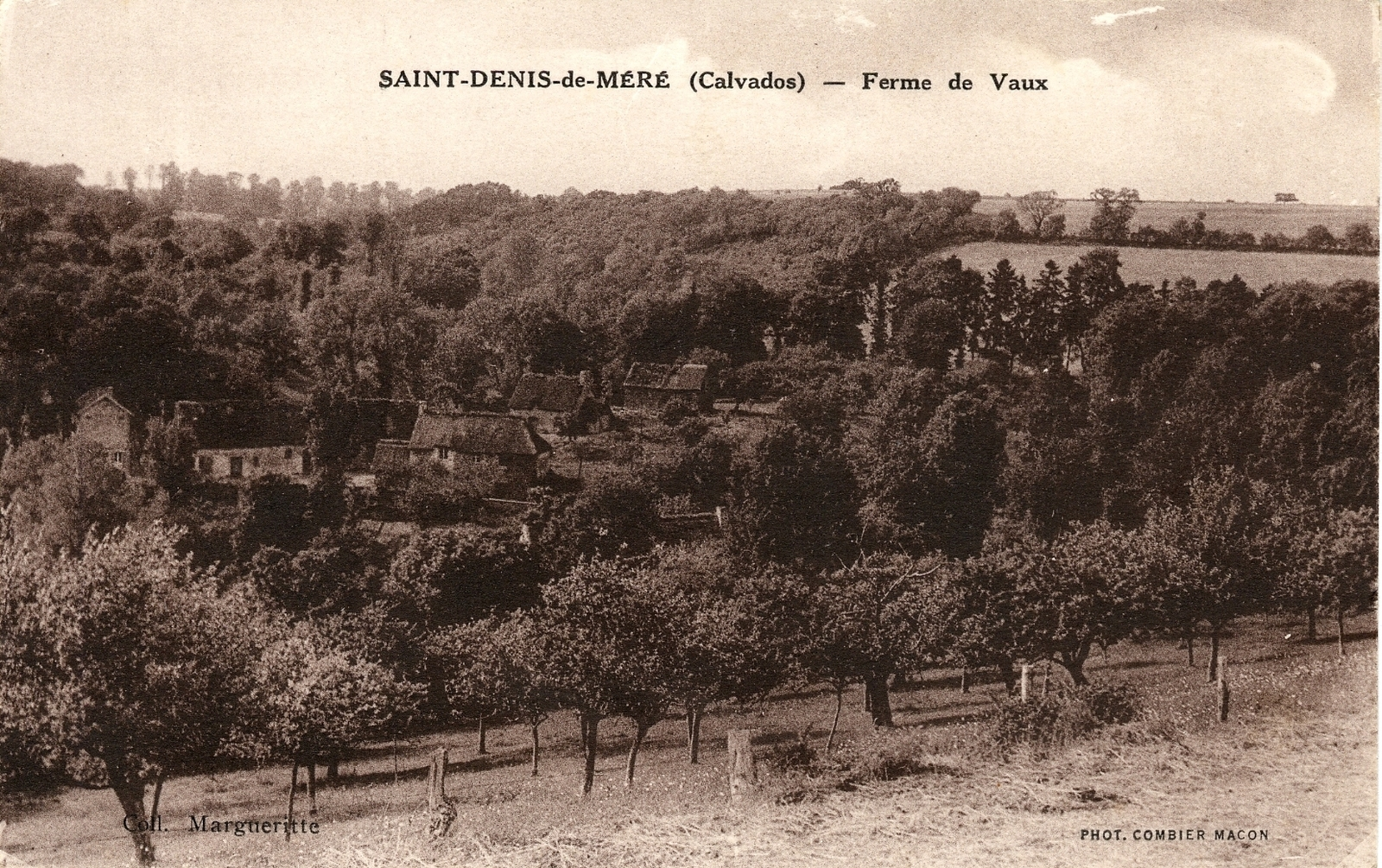
Old postcard of a farm in Saint-Denis-de-Mere

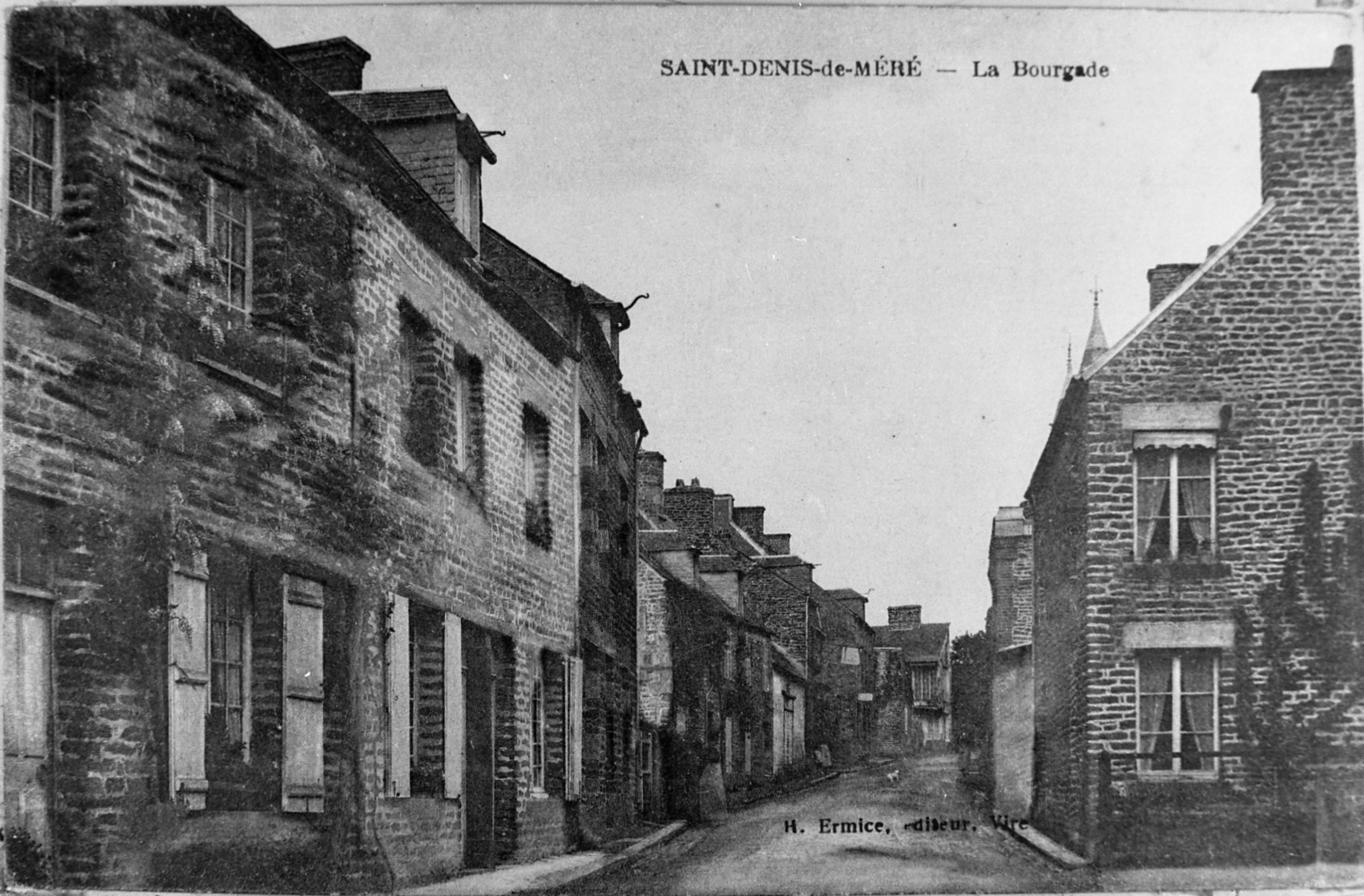
Old postcard showing the village of Saint-Denis-de-Mere

== See also ==
- Communes of the Calvados department
