= Saint-Manvieu-Bocage =

- Part of Noues de Sienne
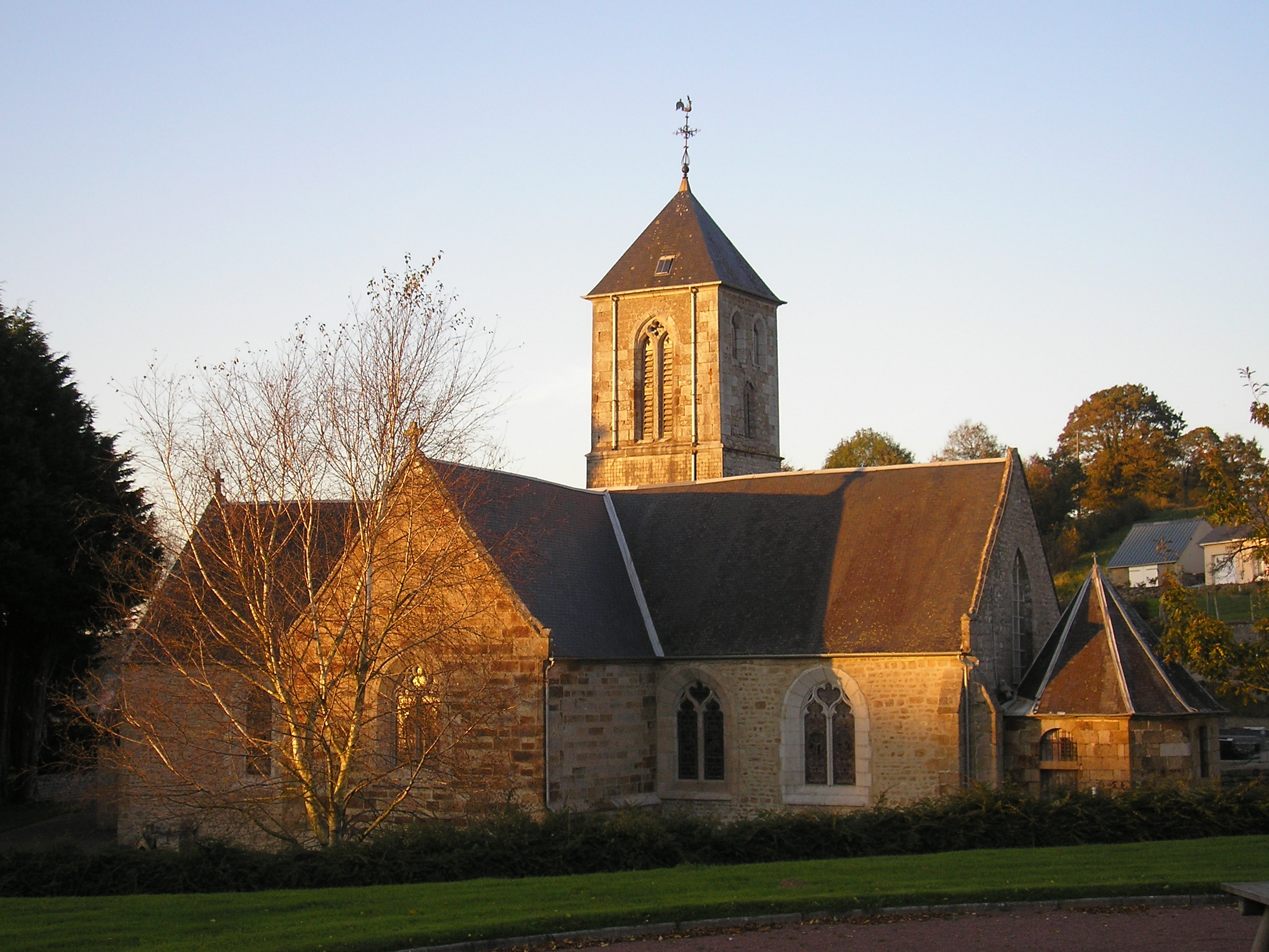
- Location of Saint-Manvieu-Bocage
- Location within France Location within Normandy
- Coordinates: 48°49′34″N 0°58′34″W
- Country: France
- Region: Normandy
- Department: Calvados
- Arrondissement: Vire
- Canton: Vire Normandie
- Commune: Noues de Sienne
- Area^{1}: 11.78 km^{2} (4.55 sq mi)
- Elevation: 202 m (663 ft)
- Highest elevation: 290 m (950 ft)
- Lowest elevation: 148 m (486 ft)
- Population (2023): 520
  - Density: 44/km^{2} (110/sq mi)
- Time zone: UTC+01:00 (CET)
  - Summer (DST): UTC+02:00 (CEST)
- Postal code: 14380
- ^{1} French Land Register data, which excludes lakes, ponds, glaciers > 1 km^{2} (0.386 sq mi or 247 acres) and river estuaries.

Saint-Manvieu-Bocage (French pronunciation: [sɛ̃ mɑ̃vjø bɔkaʒ]) is a former commune in the Calvados department in the Normandy region in northwestern France. On 1 January 2017, it was merged into the new commune Noues de Sienne.

== See also ==
- Communes of the Calvados department
