= Noues de Sienne =

- Commune
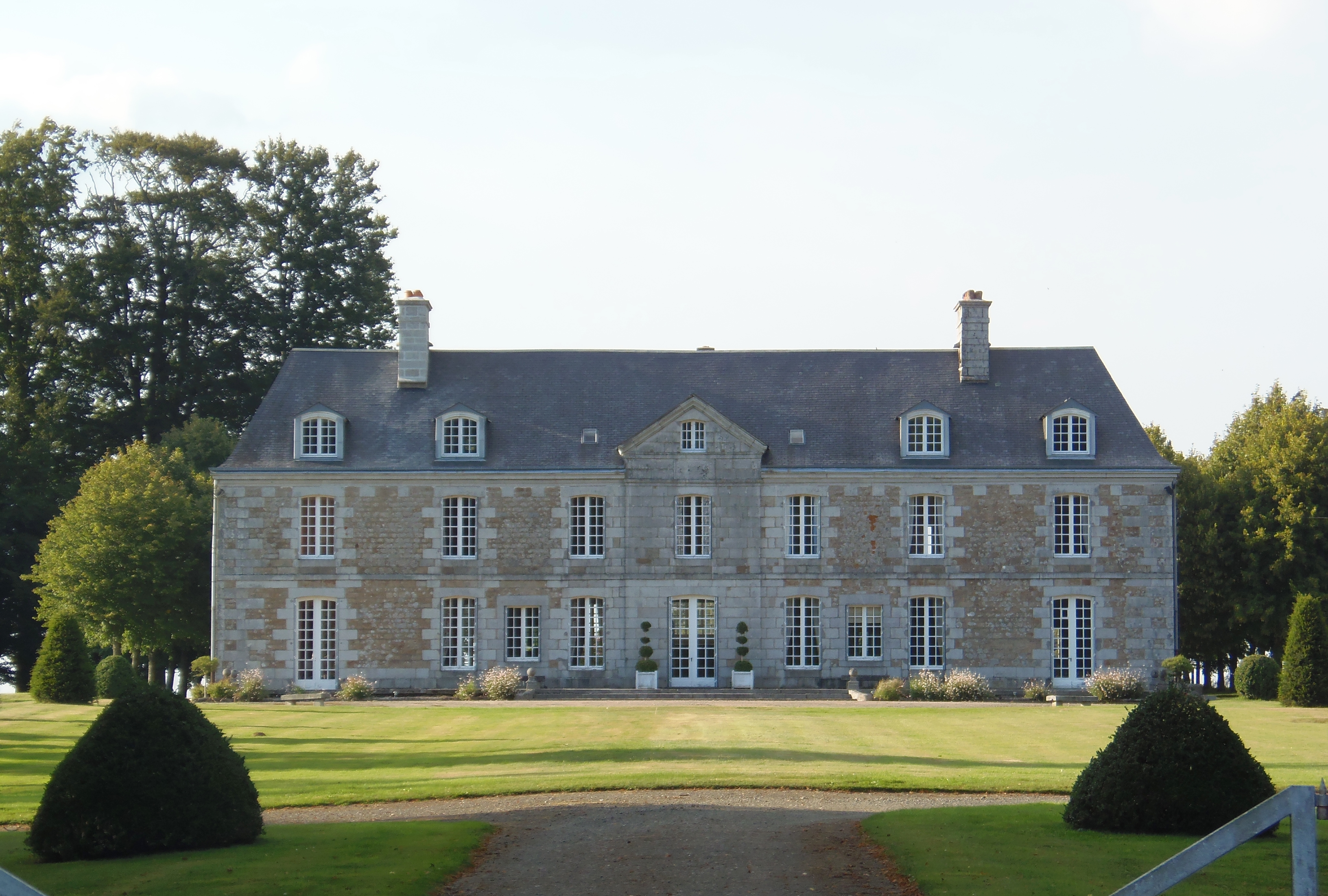
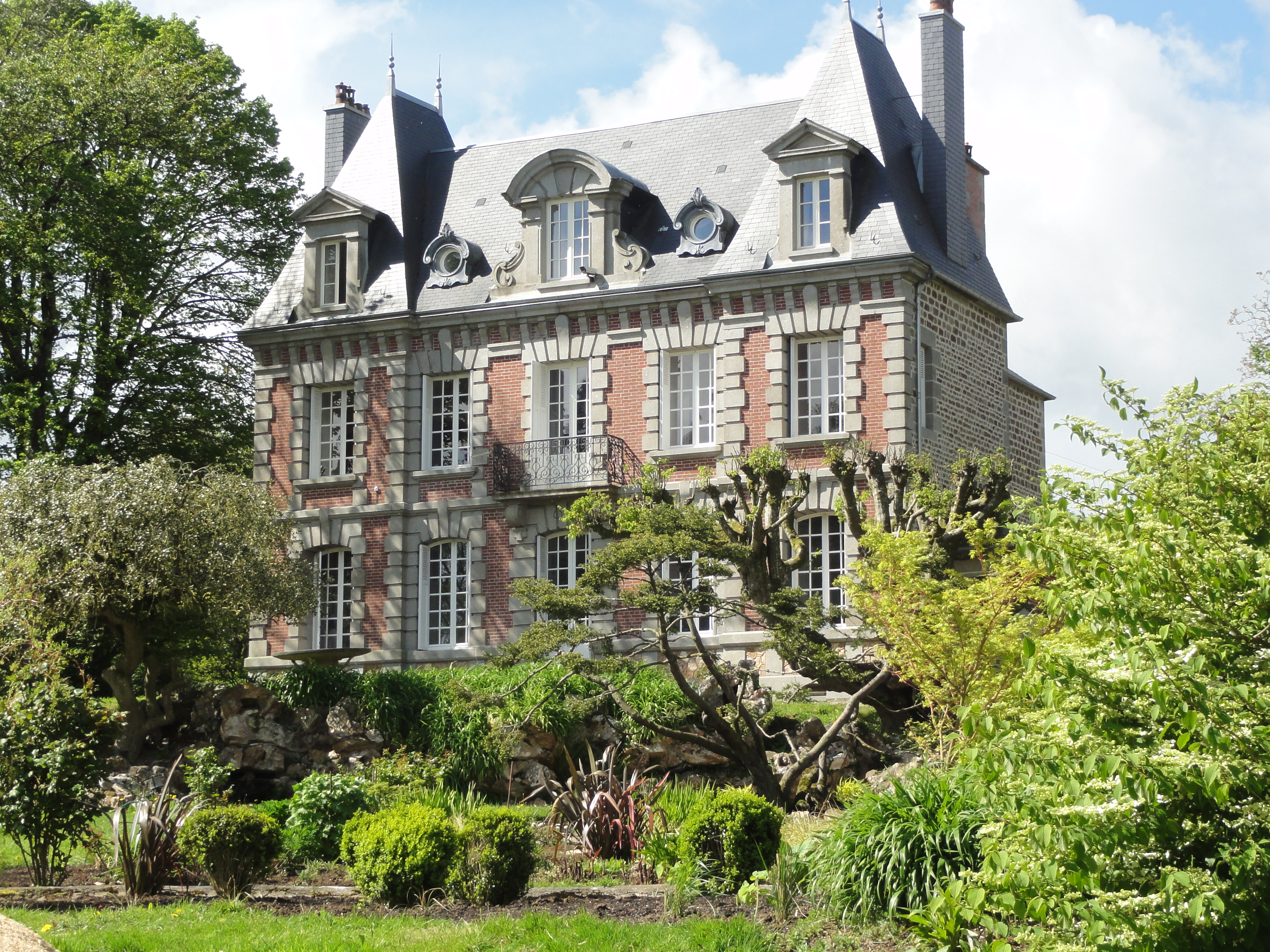
- Chateaux in Saint-Sever-Calvados
- Location of Noues de Sienne
- Location within France Location within Normandy
- Coordinates: 48°50′28″N 1°02′53″W
- Country: France
- Region: Normandy
- Department: Calvados
- Arrondissement: Vire
- Canton: Vire Normandie
- Intercommunality: Intercom de la Vire au Noireau

Government
  - Mayor (2020–2026): Georges Ravenel
- Area^{1}: 117.58 km^{2} (45.40 sq mi)
- Population (2023): 4,207
  - Density: 35.78/km^{2} (92.67/sq mi)
- Time zone: UTC+01:00 (CET)
  - Summer (DST): UTC+02:00 (CEST)
- INSEE/Postal code: 14658 /14380
- ^{1} French Land Register data, which excludes lakes, ponds, glaciers > 1 km^{2} (0.386 sq mi or 247 acres) and river estuaries.

Noues de Sienne (French pronunciation: [nu də sjɛn], literally Swamps of Sienne) is a commune in the department of Calvados, northwestern France. The municipality was established on 1 January 2017 by merger of the former communes of Saint-Sever-Calvados (the seat), Champ-du-Boult, Courson, Fontenermont, Le Gast, Le Mesnil-Benoist, Le Mesnil-Caussois, Mesnil-Clinchamps, Saint-Manvieu-Bocage and Sept-Frères.

== Population ==
Population data refer to the commune in its geography as of January 2025.

Historical population
Year	Pop.	±% p.a.
1968	5,150	—
1975	4,608	−1.58%
1982	4,504	−0.33%
1990	4,409	−0.27%
1999	4,501	+0.23%
2007	4,586	+0.23%
2012	4,542	−0.19%
2017	4,423	−0.53%
2023	4,207	−0.83%
Source: INSEE

== See also ==
- Communes of the Calvados department
