= Sept-Frères =

- Part of Noues de Sienne
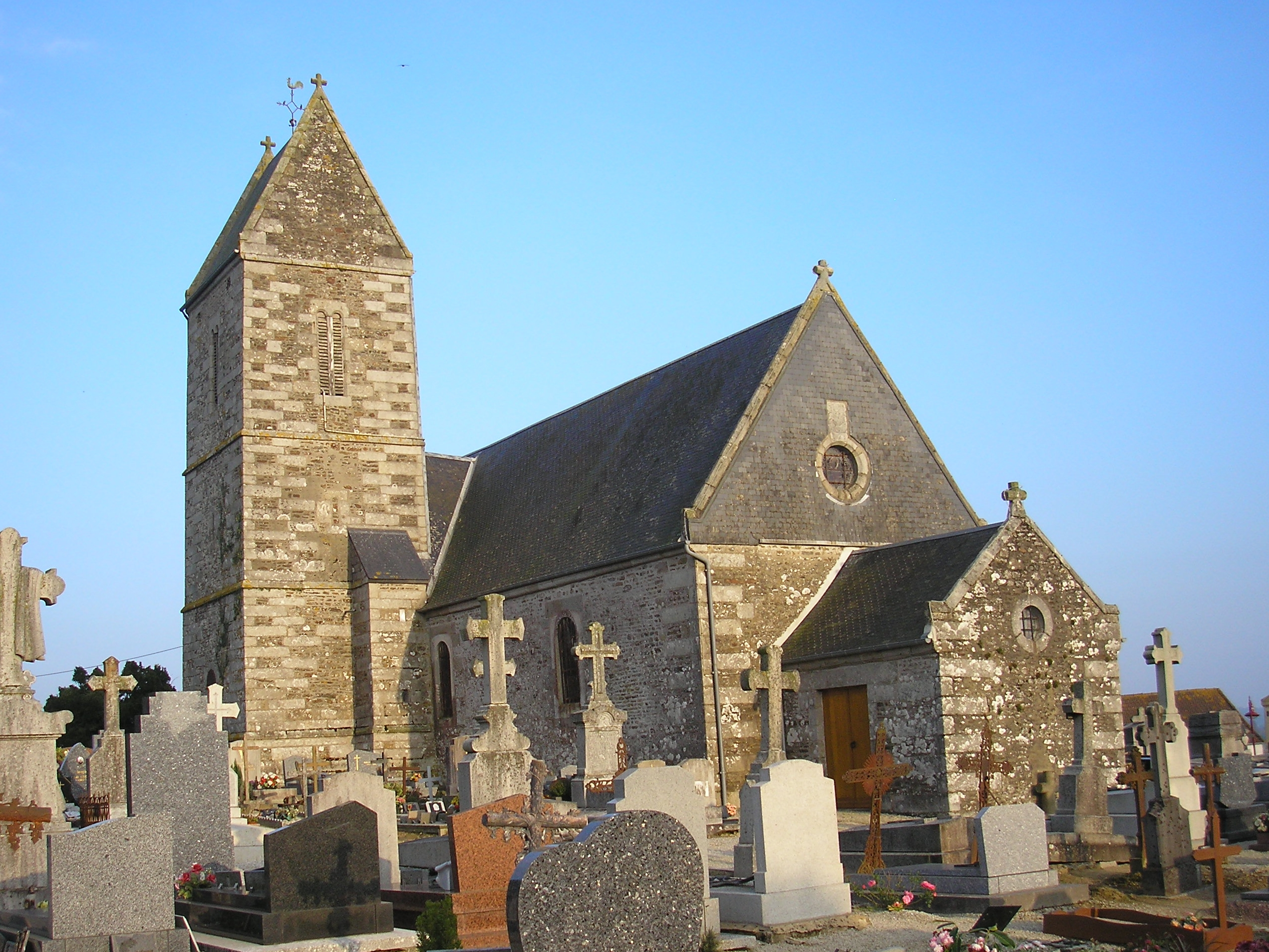
- Location of Sept-Frères
- Location within France Location within Normandy
- Coordinates: 48°51′47″N 1°01′42″W
- Country: France
- Region: Normandy
- Department: Calvados
- Arrondissement: Vire
- Canton: Vire Normandie
- Commune: Noues de Sienne
- Area^{1}: 9.63 km^{2} (3.72 sq mi)
- Elevation: 151 m (495 ft)
- Highest elevation: 197 m (646 ft)
- Lowest elevation: 84 m (276 ft)
- Population (2023): 349
  - Density: 36.2/km^{2} (93.9/sq mi)
- Time zone: UTC+01:00 (CET)
  - Summer (DST): UTC+02:00 (CEST)
- Postal code: 14380
- ^{1} French Land Register data, which excludes lakes, ponds, glaciers > 1 km^{2} (0.386 sq mi or 247 acres) and river estuaries.

Sept-Frères (French pronunciation: [sɛt fʁɛʁ], literally Seven Brothers) is a former commune in the Calvados department in the Normandy region in northwestern France. On 1 January 2017, it was merged into the new commune Noues de Sienne.

== See also ==
- Communes of the Calvados department
