= Le Mesnil-Robert =

- Commune
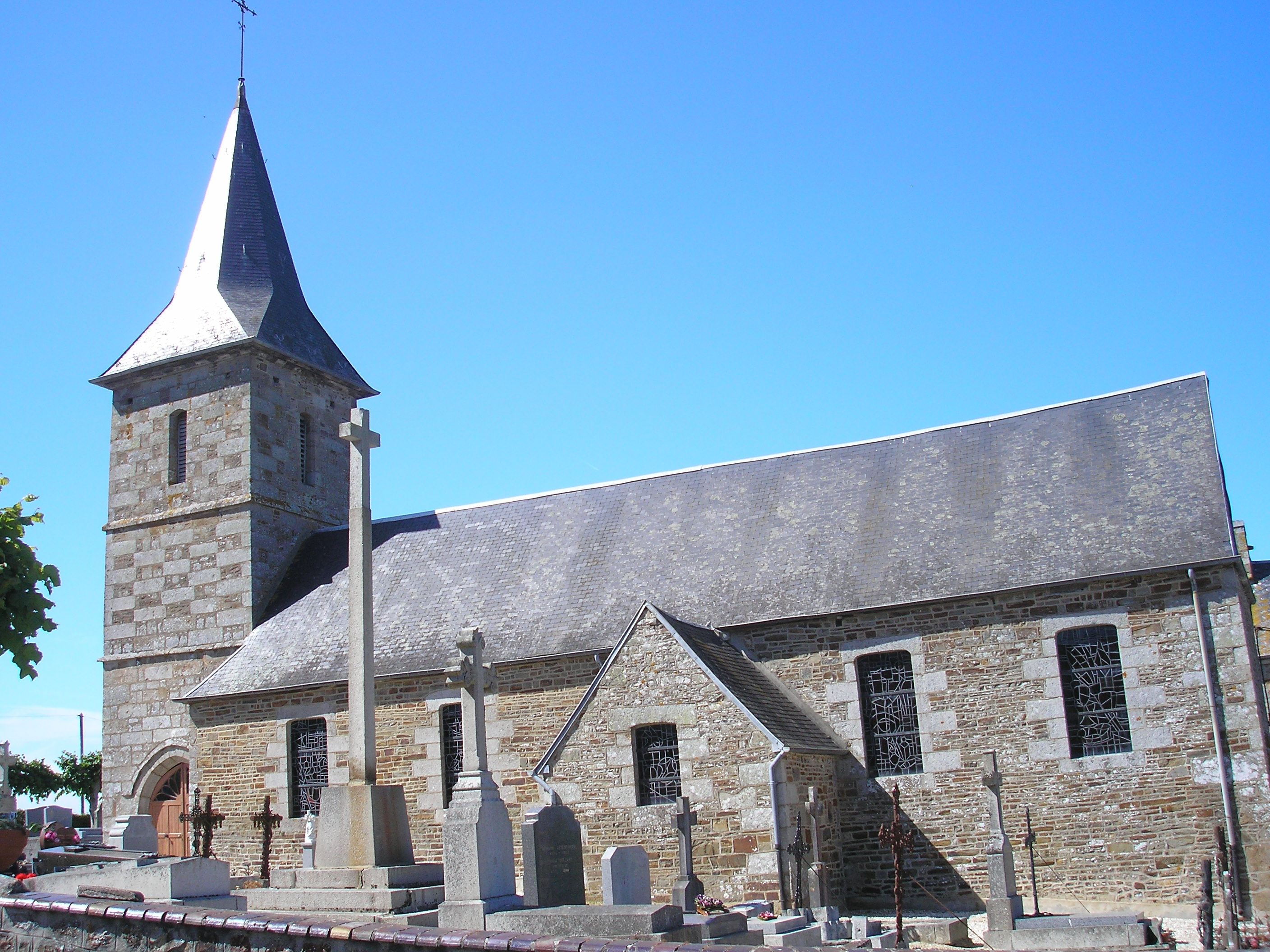
- The church in Le Mesnil-Robert

- Coat of arms
- Location of Le Mesnil-Robert
- Location within France Location within Normandy
- Coordinates: 48°52′29″N 0°57′17″W
- Country: France
- Region: Normandy
- Department: Calvados
- Arrondissement: Vire
- Canton: Vire Normandie
- Intercommunality: Intercom de la Vire au Noireau

Government
  - Mayor (2020–2026): Jean-Claude Ruault
- Area^{1}: 4.08 km^{2} (1.58 sq mi)
- Elevation: 123 m (404 ft)
- Highest elevation: 164 m (538 ft)
- Lowest elevation: 80 m (260 ft)
- Population (2023): 181
  - Density: 44.4/km^{2} (115/sq mi)
- Time zone: UTC+01:00 (CET)
  - Summer (DST): UTC+02:00 (CEST)
- INSEE/Postal code: 14424 /14380
- ^{1} French Land Register data, which excludes lakes, ponds, glaciers > 1 km^{2} (0.386 sq mi or 247 acres) and river estuaries.

Le Mesnil-Robert (French pronunciation: [lə mɛnil ʁɔbɛʁ]) is a commune in the Calvados department in the Normandy region in northwestern France.

== Population ==
Historical population
Year	Pop.	±% p.a.
1968	161	—
1975	151	−0.91%
1982	133	−1.80%
1990	146	+1.17%
1999	158	+0.88%
2007	173	+1.14%
2012	215	+4.44%
2017	193	−2.14%
2023	181	−1.06%
Source: INSEE

== See also ==
- Communes of the Calvados department
