= Saint-Aubin-des-Bois, Calvados =

Saint-Aubin-des-Bois
- Commune
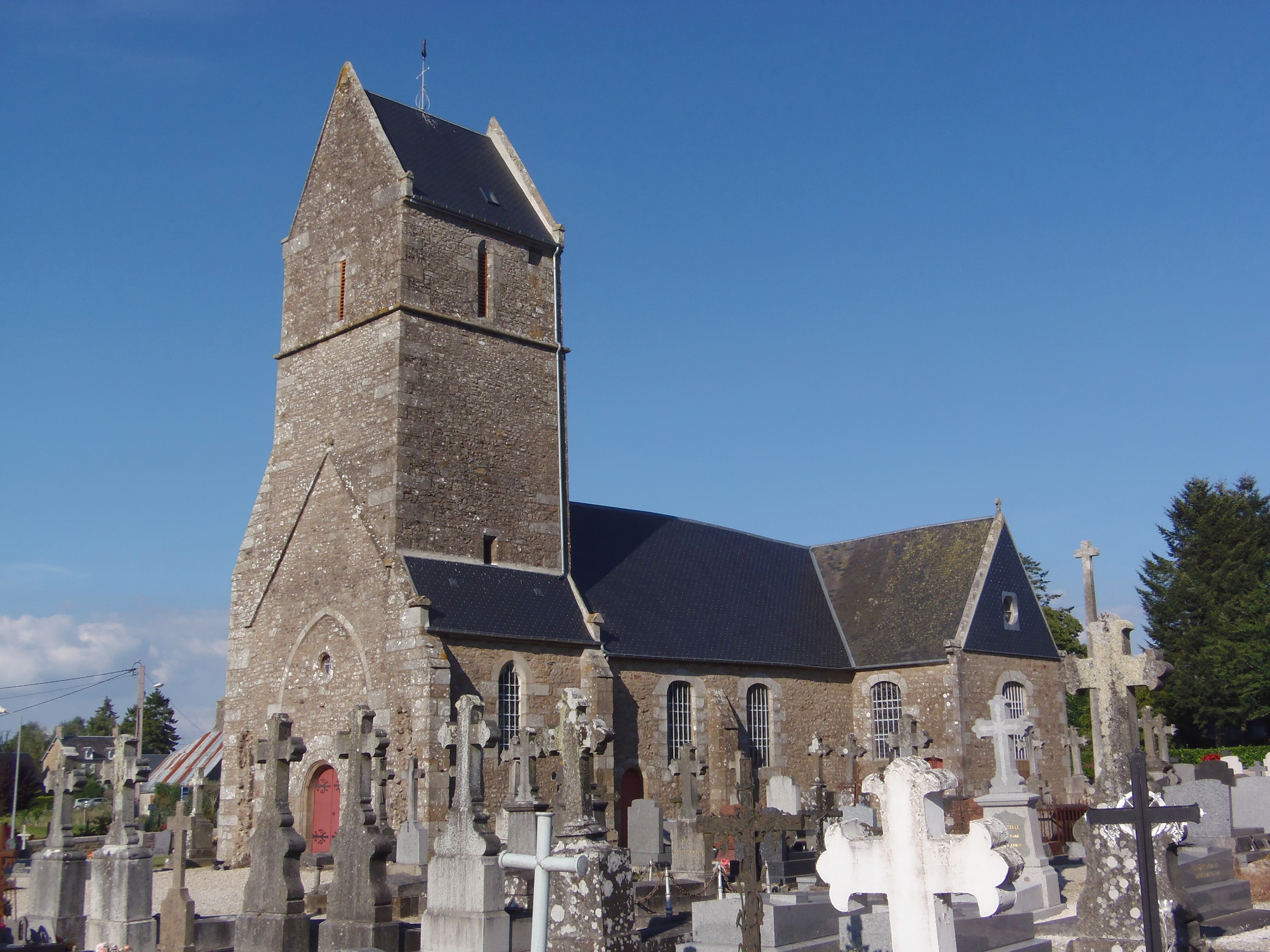
- The church in Saint-Aubin-des-Bois

- Coat of arms
- Location of Saint-Aubin-des-Bois
- Location within France Location within Normandy
- Coordinates: 48°49′48″N 1°07′38″W
- Country: France
- Region: Normandy
- Department: Calvados
- Arrondissement: Vire
- Canton: Vire Normandie
- Intercommunality: Intercom de la Vire au Noireau

Government
  - Mayor (2020–2026): Maurice Anne
- Area^{1}: 8.26 km^{2} (3.19 sq mi)
- Elevation: 172 m (564 ft)
- Highest elevation: 218 m (715 ft)
- Lowest elevation: 129 m (423 ft)
- Population (2023): 226
  - Density: 27.4/km^{2} (70.9/sq mi)
- Time zone: UTC+01:00 (CET)
  - Summer (DST): UTC+02:00 (CEST)
- INSEE/Postal code: 14559 /14380
- ^{1} French Land Register data, which excludes lakes, ponds, glaciers > 1 km^{2} (0.386 sq mi or 247 acres) and river estuaries.

Saint-Aubin-des-Bois (French pronunciation: [sɛ̃.t‿obɛ̃ de bwa]) is a commune in the Calvados department in the Normandy region in northwestern France.

== Population ==
Historical population
Year	Pop.	±% p.a.
1968	351	—
1975	307	−1.90%
1982	272	−1.71%
1990	230	−2.07%
1999	261	+1.41%
2007	232	−1.46%
2012	223	−0.79%
2017	234	+0.97%
2023	226	−0.58%
Source: INSEE

== Events ==
Saint-Aubin-des-Bois hosts an annual event each August, attracting over 5000 visitors, with demonstrations of traditional countryside skills, machinery (farm), vehicles and cars from earliest steam driven to 1960s vehicles. It is held on the third Sunday of August each year.

== See also ==
- Communes of the Calvados department
