= Beaumesnil, Calvados =

Beaumesnil
- Commune
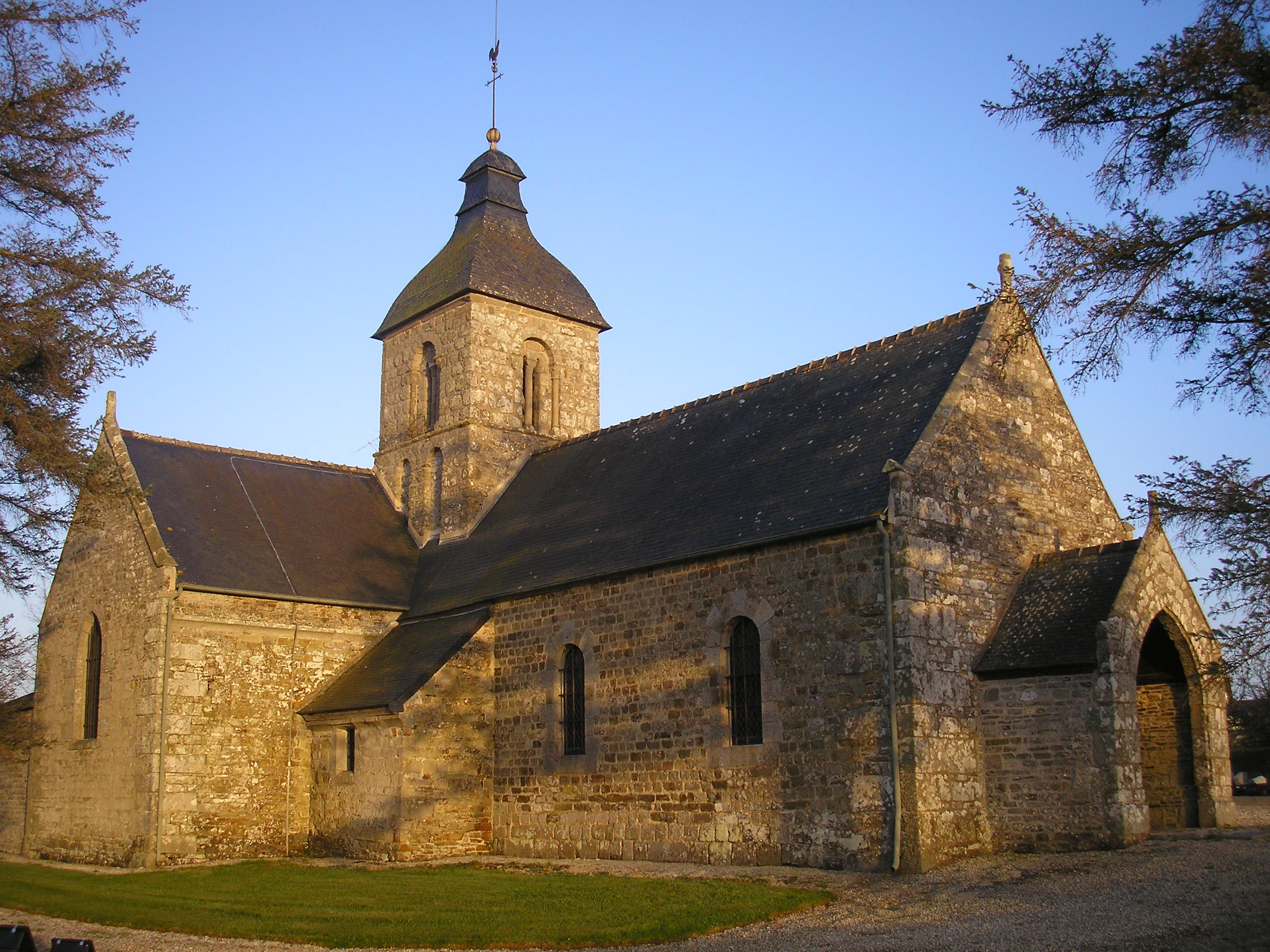
- The church in Beaumesnil
- Location of Beaumesnil
- Location within France Location within Normandy
- Coordinates: 48°53′39″N 0°58′57″W
- Country: France
- Region: Normandy
- Department: Calvados
- Arrondissement: Vire
- Canton: Vire Normandie
- Intercommunality: Intercom de la Vire au Noireau

Government
  - Mayor (2020–2026): Gilles Porquet
- Area^{1}: 4.99 km^{2} (1.93 sq mi)
- Elevation: 133 m (436 ft)
- Highest elevation: 153 m (502 ft)
- Lowest elevation: 72 m (236 ft)
- Population (2023): 207
  - Density: 41.5/km^{2} (107/sq mi)
- Time zone: UTC+01:00 (CET)
  - Summer (DST): UTC+02:00 (CEST)
- INSEE/Postal code: 14054 /14380
- ^{1} French Land Register data, which excludes lakes, ponds, glaciers > 1 km^{2} (0.386 sq mi or 247 acres) and river estuaries.

Beaumesnil (French pronunciation: [bomenil]) is a commune in the Calvados department in the Normandy region in northwestern France.

== Geography ==
The village is centred on a staggered crossroads between the D52 which heads to Pont-Farcy to the north and Vire to the south and the D81 which leads to Le Beny-Bocage to the north east and Landelles-et-Coupigny to the south west.

== Population ==
Historical population
Year	Pop.	±% p.a.
1968	201	—
1975	194	−0.51%
1982	152	−3.43%
1990	177	+1.92%
1999	188	+0.67%
2007	194	+0.39%
2012	215	+2.08%
2017	203	−1.14%
2023	207	+0.33%
Source: INSEE

== See also ==
- Communes of the Calvados department
