= Campagnolles =

- Commune
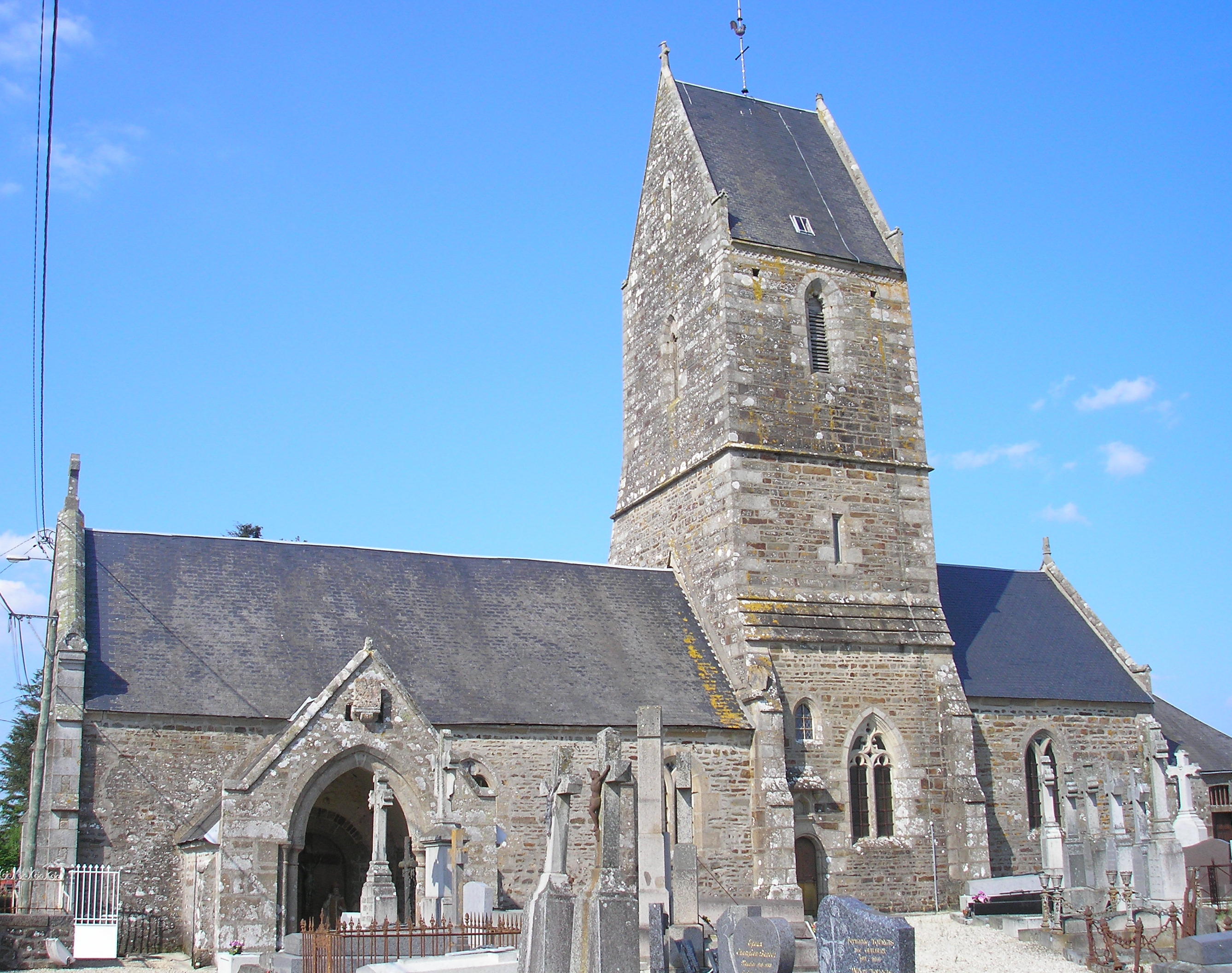
- The church in Campagnolles
- Location of Campagnolles
- Location within France Location within Normandy
- Coordinates: 48°53′27″N 0°55′26″W
- Country: France
- Region: Normandy
- Department: Calvados
- Arrondissement: Vire
- Canton: Vire Normandie
- Intercommunality: Intercom de la Vire au Noireau

Government
  - Mayor (2020–2026): Catherine Gournay-Leconte
- Area^{1}: 10.06 km^{2} (3.88 sq mi)
- Elevation: 140 m (460 ft)
- Highest elevation: 164 m (538 ft)
- Lowest elevation: 95 m (312 ft)
- Population (2023): 562
  - Density: 55.9/km^{2} (145/sq mi)
- Time zone: UTC+01:00 (CET)
  - Summer (DST): UTC+02:00 (CEST)
- INSEE/Postal code: 14127 /14500
- ^{1} French Land Register data, which excludes lakes, ponds, glaciers > 1 km^{2} (0.386 sq mi or 247 acres) and river estuaries.

Campagnolles (French pronunciation: [kɑ̃paɲɔl]) is a commune in the Calvados department in the Normandy region in northwestern France.

== Population ==
Historical population
Year	Pop.	±% p.a.
1968	361	—
1975	361	+0.00%
1982	364	+0.12%
1990	417	+1.71%
1999	392	−0.68%
2007	448	+1.68%
2012	466	+0.79%
2017	535	+2.80%
2023	562	+0.82%
Source: INSEE

== See also ==
- Communes of the Calvados department
