= Landelles-et-Coupigny =

- Commune
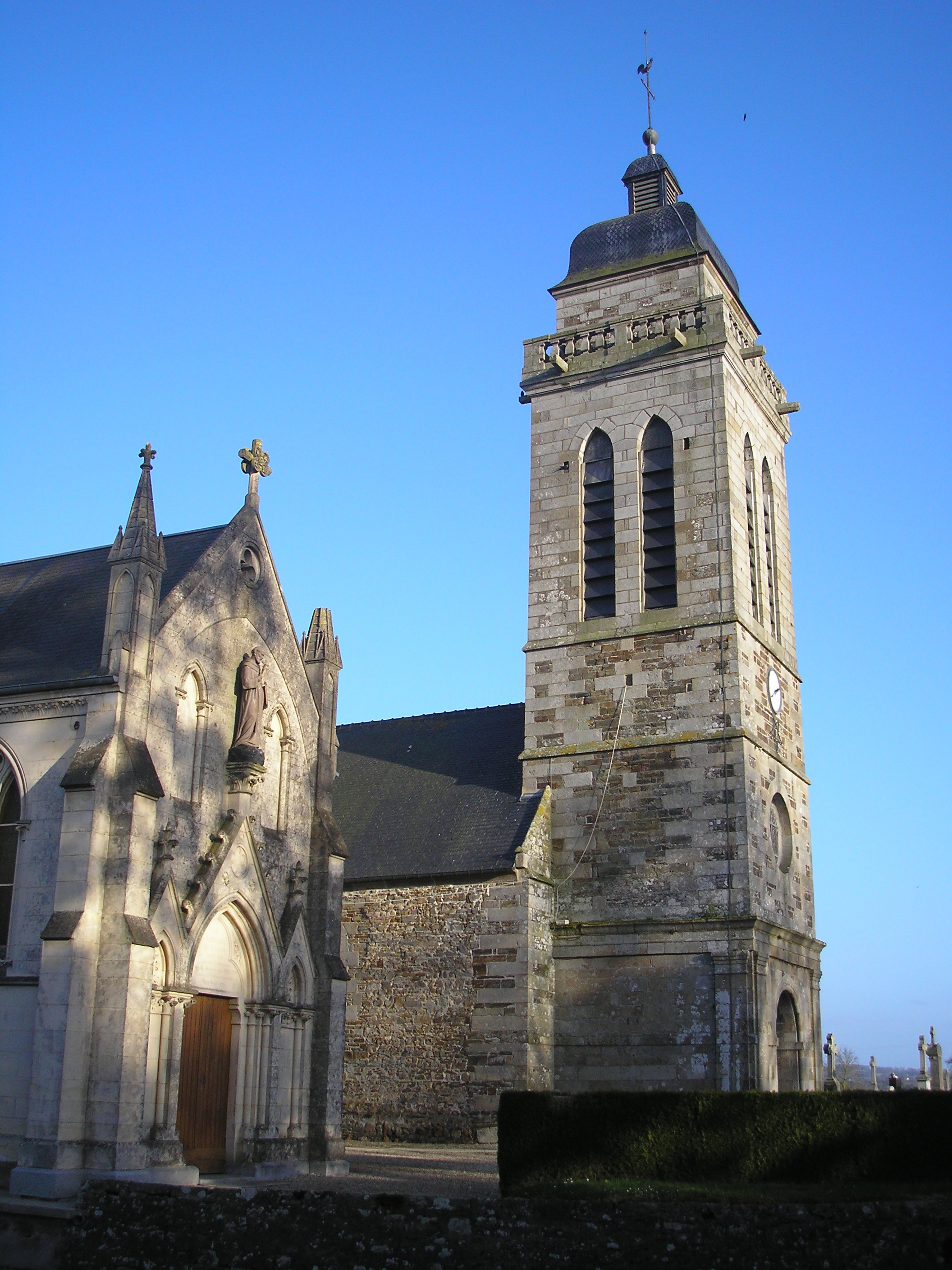
- The church in Landelles-et-Coupigny
- Location of Landelles-et-Coupigny
- Location within France Location within Normandy
- Coordinates: 48°53′19″N 0°59′48″W
- Country: France
- Region: Normandy
- Department: Calvados
- Arrondissement: Vire
- Canton: Vire Normandie
- Intercommunality: Intercom de la Vire au Noireau

Government
  - Mayor (2020–2026): Denis Jouault
- Area^{1}: 24.67 km^{2} (9.53 sq mi)
- Elevation: 200 m (660 ft)
- Highest elevation: 202 m (663 ft)
- Lowest elevation: 57 m (187 ft)
- Population (2023): 818
  - Density: 33.2/km^{2} (85.9/sq mi)
- Time zone: UTC+01:00 (CET)
  - Summer (DST): UTC+02:00 (CEST)
- INSEE/Postal code: 14352 /14380
- ^{1} French Land Register data, which excludes lakes, ponds, glaciers > 1 km^{2} (0.386 sq mi or 247 acres) and river estuaries.

Landelles-et-Coupigny (French pronunciation: [lɑ̃dɛl e kupiɲi]) is a commune in the Calvados department in the Normandy region in northwestern France.

== Population ==
Historical population
Year	Pop.	±% p.a.
1968	1,008	—
1975	903	−1.56%
1982	875	−0.45%
1990	802	−1.08%
1999	838	+0.49%
2007	821	−0.26%
2012	856	+0.84%
2017	861	+0.12%
2023	818	−0.85%
Source: INSEE

== See also ==
- Communes of the Calvados department
