= Pont-Bellanger =

- Commune
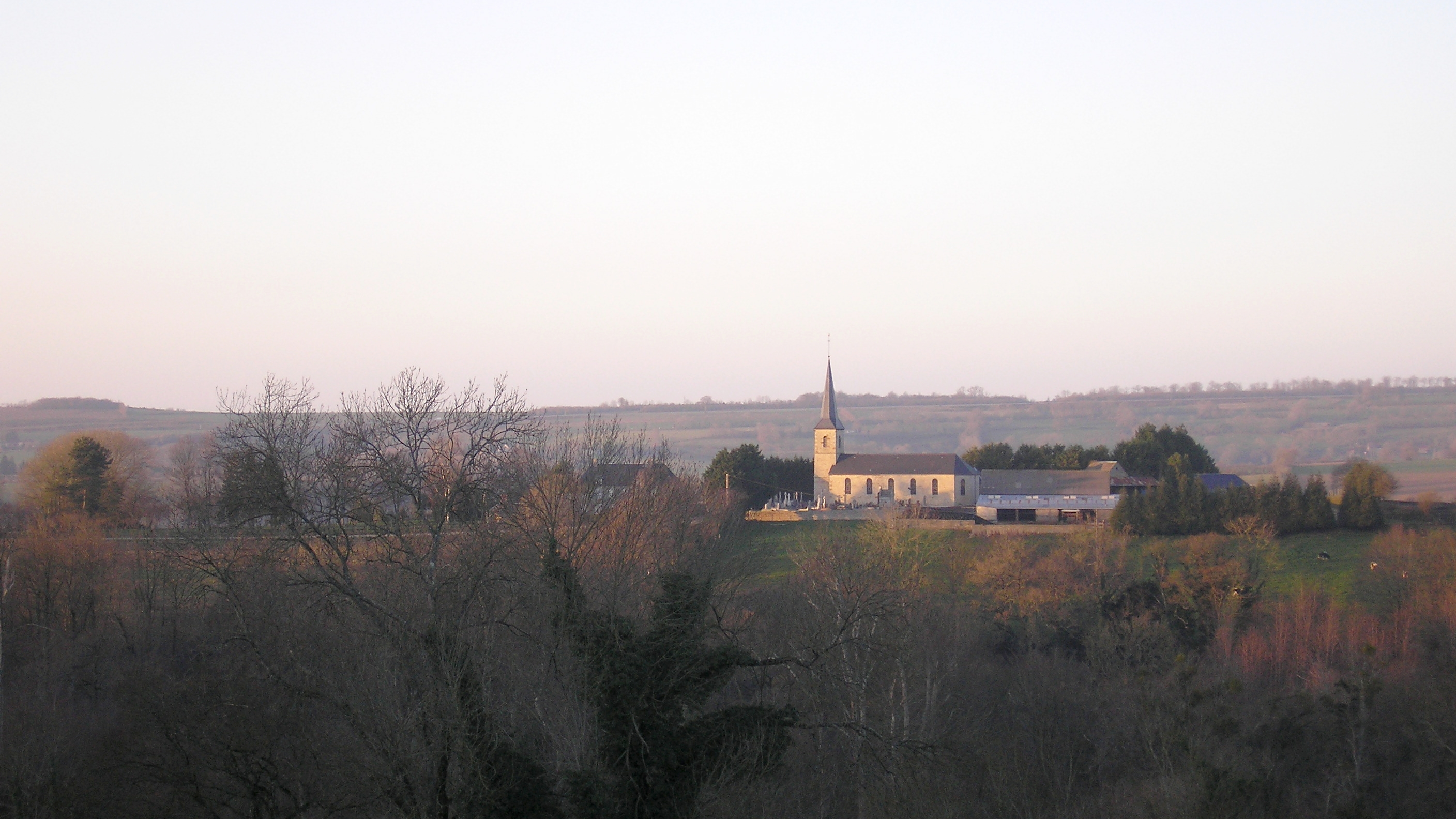
- A general view of Pont-Bellanger
- Location of Pont-Bellanger
- Location within France Location within Normandy
- Coordinates: 48°55′57″N 0°58′44″W
- Country: France
- Region: Normandy
- Department: Calvados
- Arrondissement: Vire
- Canton: Vire Normandie
- Intercommunality: Intercom de la Vire au Noireau

Government
  - Mayor (2022–2026): Jean-Pierre Murier
- Area^{1}: 3.54 km^{2} (1.37 sq mi)
- Elevation: 202 m (663 ft)
- Highest elevation: 202 m (663 ft)
- Lowest elevation: 53 m (174 ft)
- Population (2023): 60
  - Density: 17/km^{2} (44/sq mi)
- Time zone: UTC+01:00 (CET)
  - Summer (DST): UTC+02:00 (CEST)
- INSEE/Postal code: 14511 /14380
- ^{1} French Land Register data, which excludes lakes, ponds, glaciers > 1 km^{2} (0.386 sq mi or 247 acres) and river estuaries.

Pont-Bellanger (French pronunciation: [pɔ̃ bɛlɑ̃ʒe]) is a commune in the Calvados department in the Normandy region in northwestern France.

== Heritage ==
The Church of Saint-Michel in Pont-Bellanger houses a 15th-century carved stone holy water font decorated with heraldic motifs. Located beneath the church's entrance porch, the font was classified as a protected historical object under France's Monument historique system on 20 December 1911.

== Population ==
Historical population
Year	Pop.	±% p.a.
1968	121	—
1975	100	−2.69%
1982	82	−2.80%
1990	80	−0.31%
1999	87	+0.94%
2007	69	−2.86%
2012	65	−1.19%
2017	66	+0.31%
2023	60	−1.58%
Source: INSEE

== See also ==
- Communes of the Calvados department
