= Canton of Vire Normandie =

Coordinates: 48.84°N 0.89°W

- Canton
- Situation of the canton of Vire Normandie in the department of Calvados
- Country: France
- Region: Normandy
- Department: Calvados
- No. of communes: {{{nbcomm}}}
- Population (2023): 23,842
- INSEE code: 1425

The canton of Vire Normandie (before 2021: Vire) is an administrative division of the Calvados department, northwestern France. Its borders were modified at the French canton reorganisation which came into effect in March 2015. Its seat is in Vire Normandie.

It consists of the following communes:

1. Beaumesnil
2. Campagnolles
3. Landelles-et-Coupigny
4. Le Mesnil-Robert
5. Noues de Sienne
6. Pont-Bellanger
7. Saint-Aubin-des-Bois
8. Sainte-Marie-Outre-l'Eau
9. Vire Normandie
