= Aunay-sur-Odon =

- Part of Les Monts d'Aunay
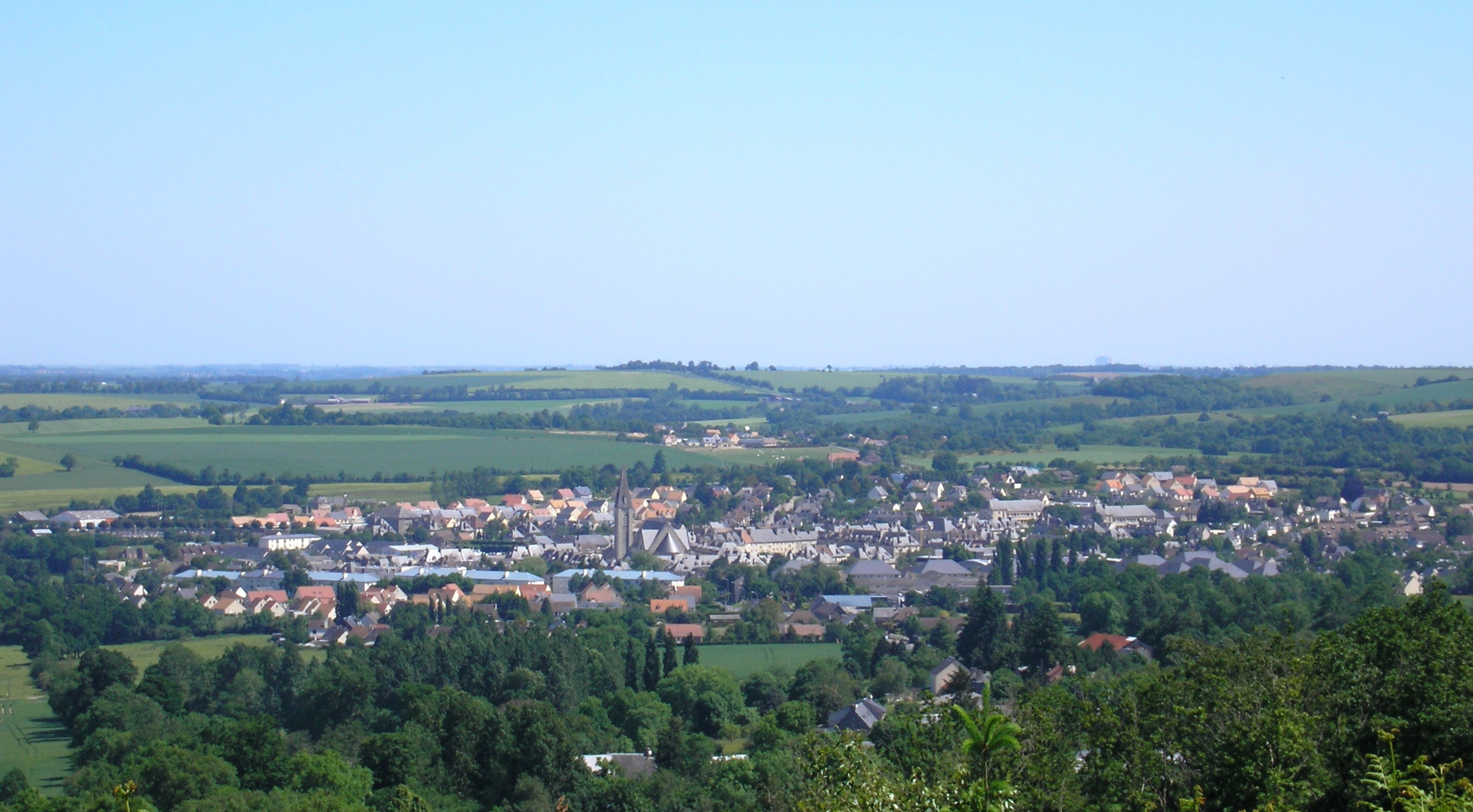

- Coat of arms
- Location of Aunay-sur-Odon
- Location within France Location within Normandy
- Coordinates: 49°01′16″N 0°37′51″W
- Country: France
- Region: Normandy
- Department: Calvados
- Arrondissement: Vire
- Canton: Les Monts d'Aunay
- Commune: Les Monts d'Aunay
- Area^{1}: 12.74 km^{2} (4.92 sq mi)
- Elevation: 123 m (404 ft)
- Highest elevation: 307 m (1,007 ft)
- Lowest elevation: 98 m (322 ft)
- Population (2022): 3,292
  - Density: 258.4/km^{2} (669.2/sq mi)
- Time zone: UTC+01:00 (CET)
  - Summer (DST): UTC+02:00 (CEST)
- Postal code: 14260
- ^{1} French Land Register data, which excludes lakes, ponds, glaciers > 1 km^{2} (0.386 sq mi or 247 acres) and river estuaries.

Aunay-sur-Odon (French pronunciation: [onɛ syʁ ɔdɔ̃], literally Aunay on Odon) is a former commune in the Calvados department in the Normandy region of north-western France. On 1 January 2017, it was merged into the new commune Les Monts d'Aunay.

The commune has been awarded two flowers by the National Council of Towns and Villages in Bloom in the Competition of cities and villages in Bloom.

== Geography ==
The commune is located at the foot of the foothills of the Armorican Massif on the Odon river a few kilometres east from its source. It is at the heart of the Pre-Bocage country of transition between the Caen plain, the Bessin, and the Bocage virois with which it is also connected.

Located at the intersection of several county roads, the agglomeration is 8 kilometres (5.0 mi) south of Villers-Bocage, 30 kilometres (19 mi) south-west of Caen, and 31 kilometres (19 mi) north-east of Vire. The D8 goes north-east to Bauquay and Caen. The D6 connects Aunay to Villers-Bocage in the north and Thury-Harcourt to the south-east. The D54 joins Cahagnes and Caumont-l'Éventé in the north-west through the village to Roucamps, Le Plessis-Grimoult, and Condé-sur-Noireau in the south. The D26 goes to Vire via Danvou-la-Ferrière and Estry in the south-west. The D213 goes to Courvaudon in the east with the D234 branching to serve Bonnemaison. The D214 goes north to Longvillers. The D291A goes west to La Bigne.

Aunay-sur-Odon is in the drainage basin of the Orne by its tributary the Odon which crosses the commune from west to north and which has its source in the neighbouring commune of Ondefontaine. Several small tributaries feed it such as the Douvette which marks the boundary with Courvaudon in the east and the Ruisseau du Val Boquet on the north-west border.

The highest point of 307 to 310 metres (1,007 to 1,017 ft) is located in the south on the border with Roucamps in a wood overlooking a place called Pied de la Bruyère. The lowest point is at 98 metres (322 ft) corresponding to the exit of the Odon from the commune to the north. The commune is about one eighth urban, forested throughout the southern part, and Bocage on the rest.

As in all of western France, Aunay-sur-Odon has an oceanic climate. The nearest weather station is at Caen-Carpiquet 23 kilometres (14 mi) north-west. Pré-Bocage country however differs in the annual rainfall which in Aunay-sur-Odon is around 950 mm.

== Toponymy ==
The name was attested as castellum Alnei in 1142. It is derived from the Latin Alnus meaning "alder".

In 1895 the commune of Aunay became Aunay-sur-Odon. The Odon passes along the west of the town.

== History ==
The town is located that had been already occupied in the Gallo-Roman era as it was at the crossroads of ancient routes from Vieux to Avranches and from Bayeux to Condé-sur-Noireau.

The Roman de Rou by Wace mentions a Lord of Alnei said to have participated in the conquest of England along with William the Conqueror. The remains of his castle from the 12th century, overlooking the present Petit Pied du Bois, are described in the third volume of the Monumental statistic of Calvados (in French) by Arcisse de Caumont (1857). The fortress was used until the Hundred Years War and was destroyed by Bertrand du Guesclin.

In 1131 the town had an abbey founded by Jordan and Luce of Say and Richard of Hommet, constable of Normandy. Originally dependent on Savigny Abbey, it became Cistercian at the end of the 12th century. It was heavily damaged in the wars of religion.

On 22 August 1886 the Caen-Aunay-Saint-Georges railway line was opened. It was then extended to Vire on 1 June 1891. Passenger service on the line was suspended on 1 March 1938. Freight service was limited to Jurques then permanently suspended. The line was then decommissioned. Today the Rue de la Gare is a reminder of the lost line.

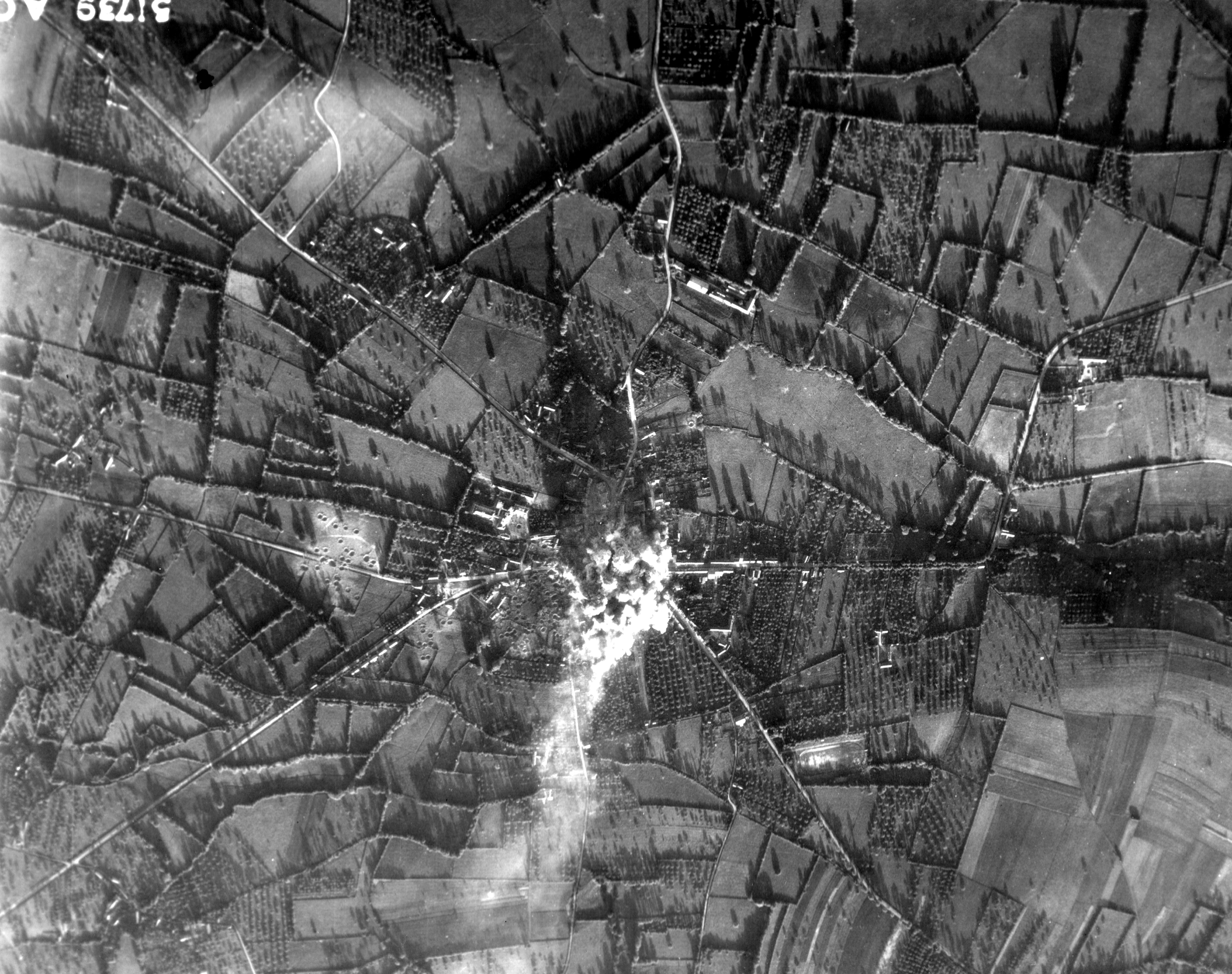
Aerial photo during the bombing of Aunay-sur-Odon

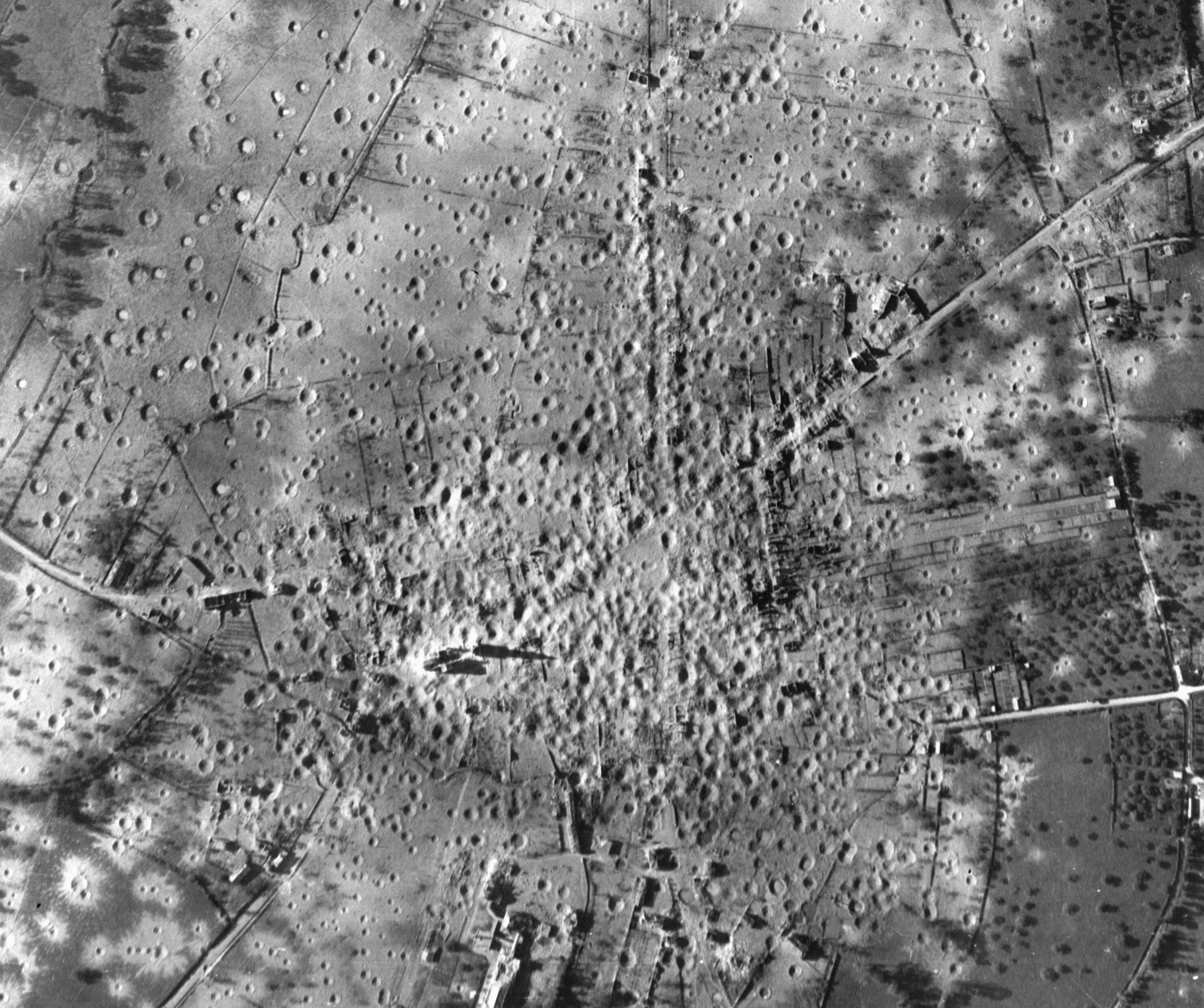
Aerial photo after the bombing of Aunay-sur-Odon

In 1944, due to its position as a crossroads, this time between Caen and Vire and between Bayeux and Falaise, the city suffered two strategic bombardments by the Allies. On 12 June two waves of aircraft destroyed all of the town centre killing a hundred people. On the night of 14 to 15 June the town was totally destroyed by a new wave of bombing. The town was completely destroyed with the precarious bell tower the only remaining building. Over 25% of the inhabitants were killed.

Reconstruction was organized very quickly with the first stone of the new town being laid on 23 November 1947 by Mr. Kerisel, construction manager at the Ministry of Reconstruction and Urbanism. It was completed in 1951 under the leadership of architect P. Dureuil.

=== Heraldry ===
| Arms of Aunay-sur-Odon | Blazon: Barry of 12 Gules and Argent. |

== Administration ==
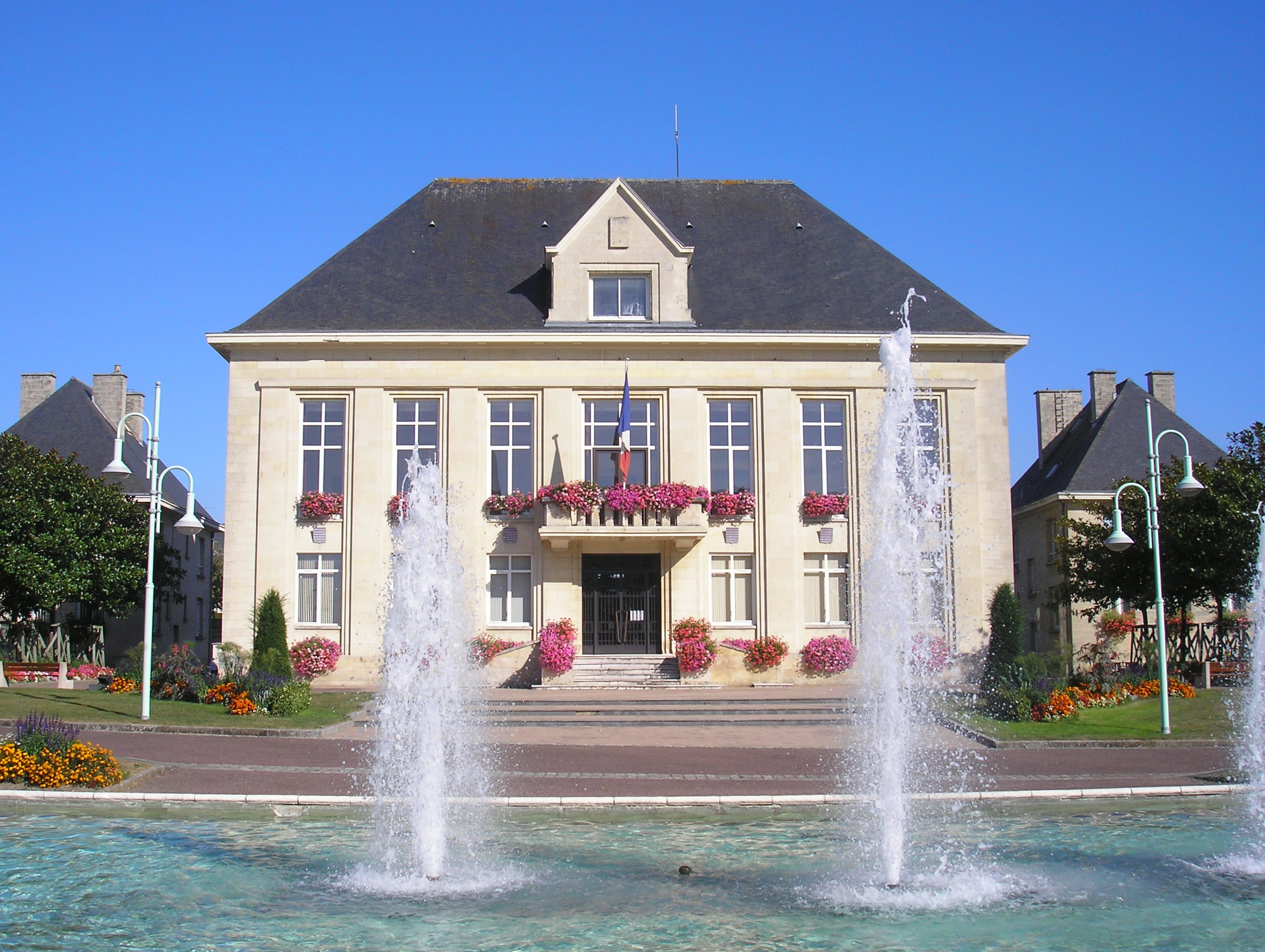
Aunay-sur-Odon Town Hall

The council was composed of 23 members including the mayor and six deputy mayors.

List of Successive Mayors

Mayors from the French Revolution to 1924

| From | To | Name | Party | Position |
|---|---|---|---|---|
| 1799 | 1806 | Nicolas Vivien | | |
| 1806 | 1809 | François Tardif | | |
| 1809 | 1813 | Thomas Varin | | |
| 1813 | 1816 | Pierre Buot-Desparquets | | |
| 1816 | 1831 | Gabriel Retout | | |
| 1831 | 1834 | Zéphir Morin | | |
| 1834 | 1843 | Micel Morin | | |
| 1843 | 1848 | Zéphir Morin | | |
| 1848 | 1851 | Pierre Hellouin | | |
| 1851 | 1867 | Zéphir Morin | | |
| 1867 | 1876 | Pierre Marie | | |
| 1876 | 1880 | Victor Delaplanche | | |
| 1880 | 1882 | Exupère Girard | | |
| 1882 | 1883 | Georges Valpincon | | |
| 1883 | 1888 | Louis Tardif | | |
| 1888 | 1896 | Édouard Ybert | | |
| 1896 | 1902 | Alphonse Lerot | | |
| 1902 | 1919 | Alfred Frilley | | |
| 1919 | 1924 | Henri Fauvel | | |

Mayors from 1924

| From | To | Name | Party | Position |
|---|---|---|---|---|
| 1924 | 1965 | Louis Lacaine | | |
| 1965 | 1971 | Marcel Hubert | | |
| 1971 | 1988 | André Brion | | |
| 1988 | 2001 | Marcel Bénard | | |
| 2001 | 2008 | Pierre Lefèvre | | Retired School Headmaster |
| 2008 | 2012 | Daniel Burtin | | Territorial official |
| 2013 | 2017 | Pierre Lefèvre | | |

=== Police ===
A squadron of Mobile Gendarmerie (EGM 24/3) is based in Aunay-sur-Odon.

=== Education ===
Aunay-sur-Odon has a nursery school and a public elementary school. Secondary education is provided by the Charles Lemaître College who also host a general and vocational education section.

=== Twinning ===
Aunay-sur-Odon has twinning associations with:

- Holsworthy (United Kingdom) since 1976.
- Mömbris (Germany) since 1989.

== Demography ==
The inhabitants of the commune are known as Aunais or Aunaises in French.

Historical population

| Year | Pop. | ±% p.a. |
|---|---|---|
| 1793 | 1,394 | — |
| 1800 | 1,807 | +3.78% |
| 1806 | 1,888 | +0.73% |
| 1821 | 2,007 | +0.41% |
| 1831 | 1,984 | −0.12% |
| 1836 | 2,033 | +0.49% |
| 1841 | 1,975 | −0.58% |
| 1846 | 2,064 | +0.89% |
| 1851 | 2,102 | +0.37% |
| 1856 | 2,042 | −0.58% |
| 1861 | 2,005 | −0.37% |
| 1866 | 2,057 | +0.51% |
| 1872 | 1,921 | −1.13% |
| 1876 | 1,925 | +0.05% |
| 1881 | 1,948 | +0.24% |
| 1886 | 1,898 | −0.52% |
| 1891 | 1,858 | −0.43% |
| 1896 | 1,854 | −0.04% |

| Year | Pop. | ±% p.a. |
|---|---|---|
| 1901 | 1,808 | −0.50% |
| 1906 | 1,741 | −0.75% |
| 1911 | 1,670 | −0.83% |
| 1921 | 1,450 | −1.40% |
| 1926 | 1,601 | +2.00% |
| 1931 | 1,618 | +0.21% |
| 1936 | 1,676 | +0.71% |
| 1946 | 1,145 | −3.74% |
| 1954 | 2,644 | +11.03% |
| 1962 | 3,154 | +2.23% |
| 1968 | 3,117 | −0.20% |
| 1975 | 2,905 | −1.00% |
| 1982 | 3,035 | +0.63% |
| 1990 | 2,878 | −0.66% |
| 1999 | 2,902 | +0.09% |
| 2007 | 2,944 | +0.18% |
| 2012 | 3,217 | +1.79% |
| 2022 | 3,292 | +0.23% |

Source: EHESS and INSEE

== Economy and tourism ==
Aunay-sur-Odon is part of the tourist destination of Bocage Normand. Guided tours of the city are available from the tourist office. There are hiking and biking trails at the entry point to Norman Switzerland.

== Sites and Monuments ==
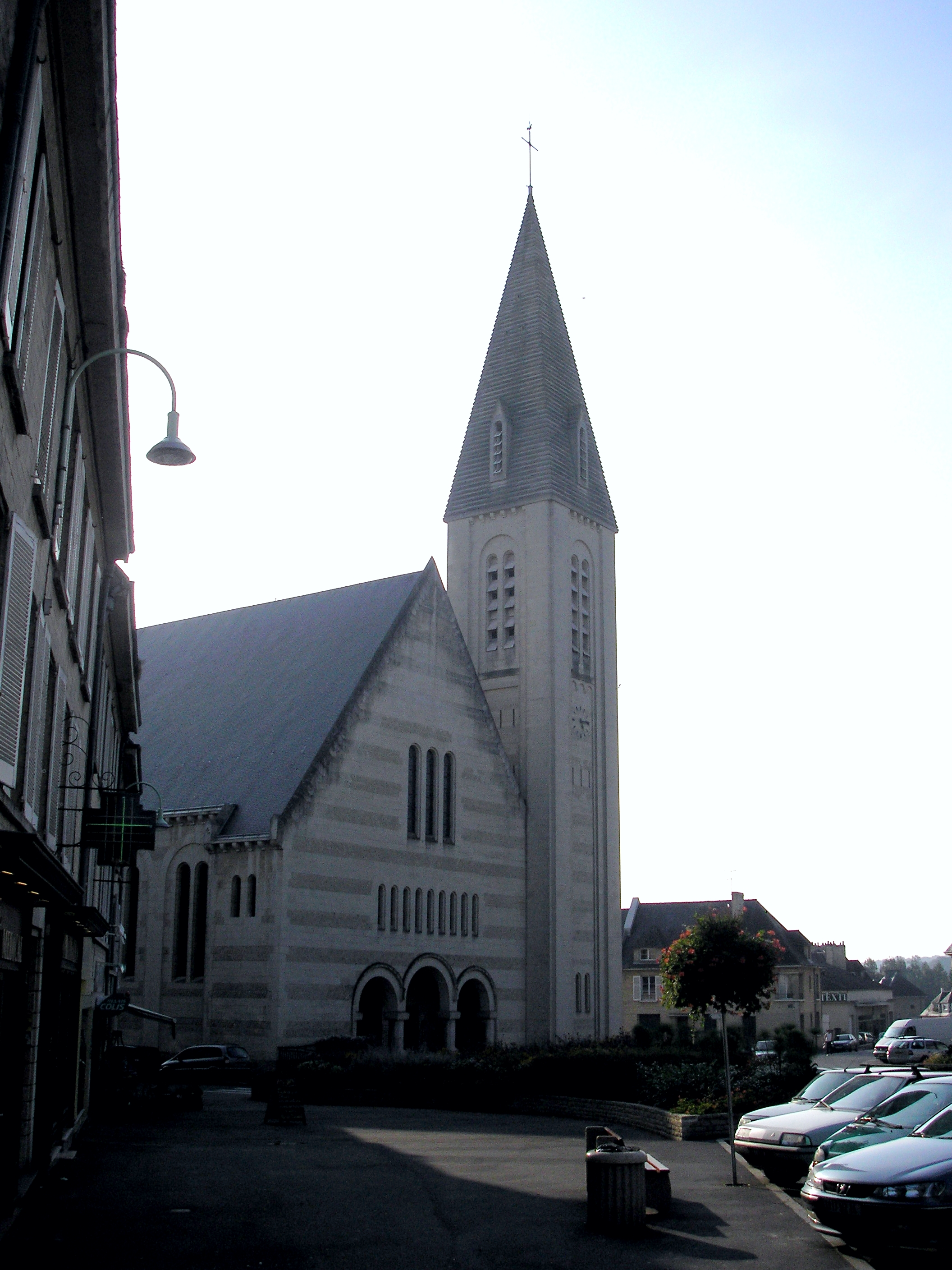
The Church of Saint-Samson.

- Aunay Abbey: the remains of the Cistercian Abbey from the 12th century.
- Motte-and-bailey castle
- Church of Saint Samson, rebuilt in the 20th century. It replaces the old church which was also dedicated to Saint Samson but was almost entirely destroyed by Allied bombing in June 1944. Arcisse de Caumont dated the old church from the end of the 16th century. The church which was rebuilt in 1951-1952 contains a very coherent iconographic ensemble conducted by a team that combined four artists: Jacques Le Chevallier, the programme manager, Maurice Rocher, and Paul and Jacques Bony.

== Activities and events ==
- The commune is a flowery city having obtained two flowers in the Competition of cities and villages in bloom.
- The AIPOS association organizes an annual cultural season in the communes of Aunay-sur-Odon and Villers-Bocage. Music, theatre, and dance. The opening show of the season is usually free. Others require a subscription or purchase of an entry ticket.
- The Cinema Paradiso is a cooperative operation and offers the latest movies.

=== Sports ===
- The Athletic Union of Aunay-sur-Odon fields a soccer team in the Lower Normandy league and was second in the district Division.
- The Sports and Leisure Club of Aunay-sur-Odon since 2007 has been the sports club for the Mobile Gendarmerie Squadron.
- The Athletics club, the secular friends of Aunay-Villers-Évrecy (ALAVE) has catered for young people for over 40 years. The club is best known for its hammer throwers who several times qualified for the championships of France.
- Aunay VTT allows all-terrain bikes to practice this sport.

== Notable people linked to the commune ==
- Anais Bescond (born 1987), French biathlete.
- Charles Lelong (1891-1970), an athlete specialising in the 400 metres, silver medalist at the 1912 Summer Olympics.
- Paul Jules Tillaux (1834-1904), surgeon and anatomist.

== See also ==
- Communes of the Calvados department
