= Aleksander Chudek =

Polish World War II flying ace

- Born: 17 August 1914; Stoczek, Poland
- Died: 23 June 1944 (aged 29) near Le Plessis-Grimoult, France
- Military career
- Allegiance: Poland; United Kingdom
- Branch: Polish Air Force; Royal Air Force
- Service years: until 1944
- Rank: chorąży
- Service number: 783023
- Units: Polish 114th Fighter Escadrille; No. 315 Polish Fighter Squadron; No. 303 Polish Fighter Squadron
- Conflicts: Polish Defensive War, World War II
- Awards: Virtuti Militari; Cross of Valour; Distinguished Flying Medal (UK)

Aleksander Chudek (17 August 1914 – 23 June 1944) was a Polish fighter ace of the Royal Air Force in World War II with 9 confirmed kills.

== Biography ==
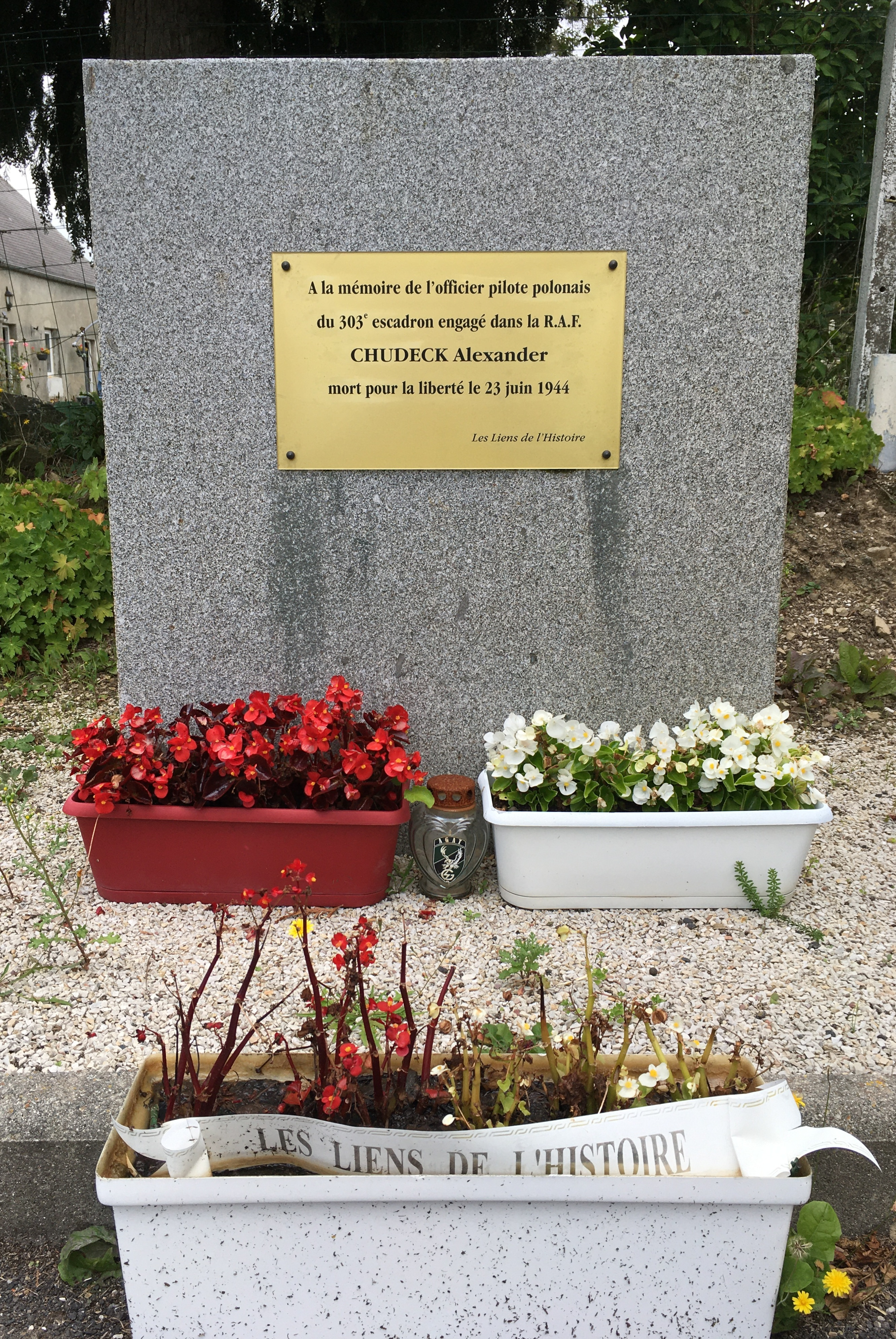
Aleksander Chudek stele in Le Plessis-Grimoult, France

Before World War II Chudek served in the Polish 114th Fighter Escadrille. After the Soviet invasion of Poland he crossed the border with Romania, then he came to France and finally, on 27 June 1940, arrived in the United Kingdom. After a brief induction into the Royal Air Force, he was assigned to an auxiliary unit of the RAF as a pilot distributing new or refurbished aircraft at airports across the UK. In June 1941 he was transferred to No. 55 Operational Training Unit and began training on the Hawker Hurricane fighter. In July he was assigned to No. 315 Polish Fighter Squadron where he flew Supermarine Spitfire fighters. On 14 August 1941 he shot down his first plane. In July 1943 he was posted for three months to No. 303 Polish Fighter Squadron. On 23 June 1944 he flew over Normandy and never came back. Initially it was thought that his plane fell into the sea, but in 2009 it was found that the plane crashed between the towns of Le Plessis-Grimoult and Roucamps.

On 23 June 2009, 65 years after the crash, a monument dedicated to Aleksander Chudek was erected in Le Plessis-Grimoult.

== Aerial victory credits ==
- Bf 109 – 14 August 1941 and 1 damaged
- Bf 109 (two) – 29 August 1941
- Bf 109 – 16 September 1941
- Fw 190 – 27 September 1941 (probably destroyed)
- Fw 190 – 21 October 1941
- Fw 190 (two) – 17 August 1943
- Fw 190 – 6 September 1943
- Fw 190 – 23 September 1943

Chudek is credited with destroying nine enemy aircraft, with one probably destroyed and another damaged.

== Awards ==
Virtuti Militari, Silver Cross
Cross of Valour (Poland), four times
Distinguished Flying Medal

== Bibliography ==
- Shores, Christopher; Williams, Clive (1994). Aces High: A Tribute to the Most Notable Fighter Pilots of the British and Commonwealth Forces in WWII. London, United Kingdom: Grub Street. ISBN 1-898697-00-0.
- Sikora, Piotr: Asy polskiego lotnictwa. Warszawa: Oficyna Wydawnicza Alma-Press, 2014, s. 218-222. ISBN 9788370205607
- Tadeusz Jerzy Krzystek, Anna Krzystek: Polskie Siły Powietrzne w Wielkiej Brytanii w latach 1940-1947 łącznie z Pomocniczą Lotniczą Służbą Kobiet (PLSK-WAAF). Sandomierz: Stratus, 2012, s. 131. ISBN 9788361421597
- Zieliński, Józef (1994). Asy polskiego lotnictwa (in Polish). Warsaw: Agencja Lotnicza ALTAIR. p. 25. ISBN 83-86217-2. LCCN 95149065. OCLC 34751125. OL 865104M.
