= Les Monts d'Aunay =

- Commune
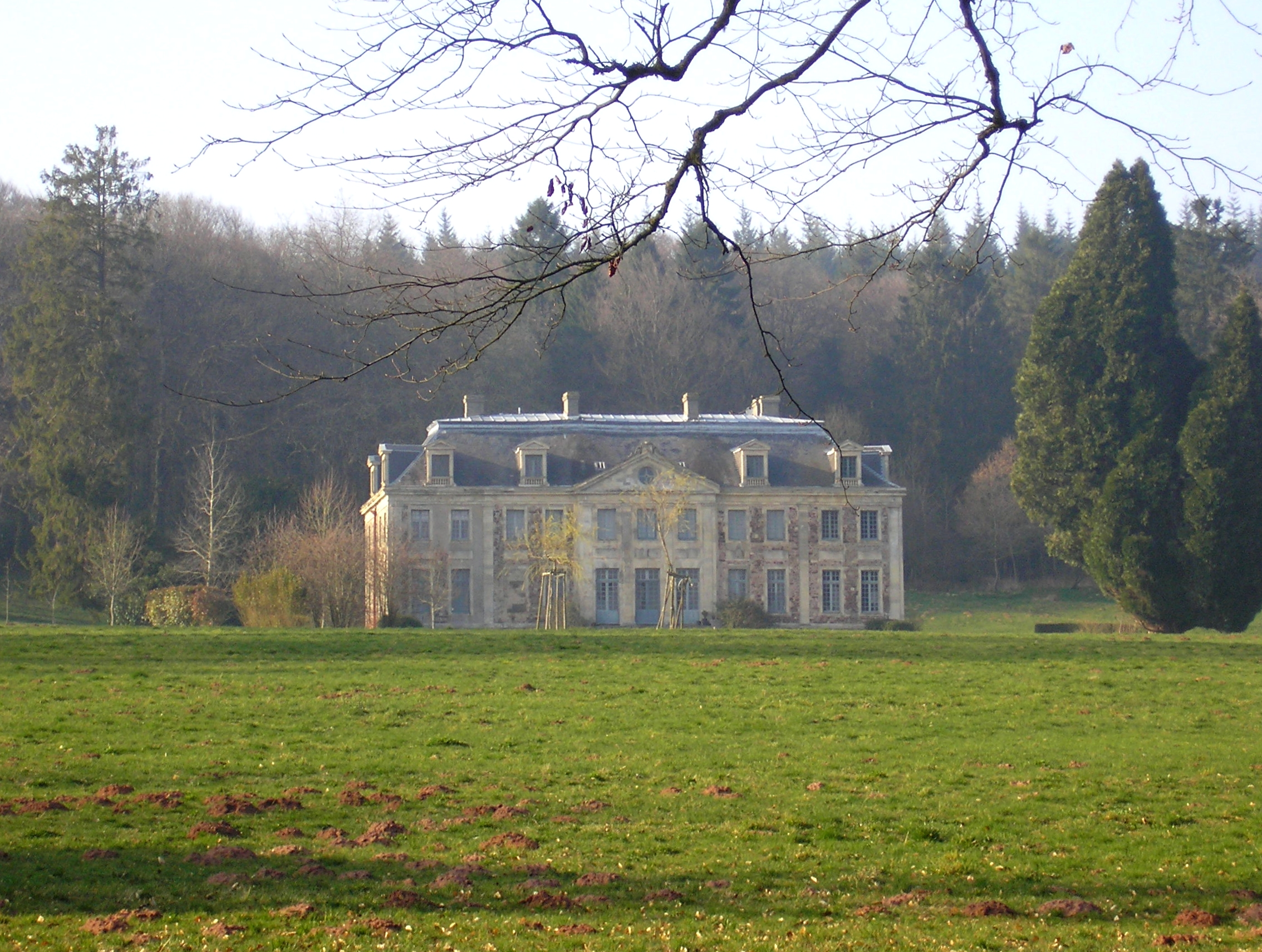
- The château of La Ferrière
- Location of Les Monts d'Aunay
- Location within France Location within Normandy
- Coordinates: 49°01′12″N 0°37′55″W
- Country: France
- Region: Normandy
- Department: Calvados
- Arrondissement: Vire
- Canton: Les Monts d'Aunay
- Intercommunality: CC Pré-Bocage Intercom

Government
  - Mayor (2020–2026): Christine Salmon
- Area^{1}: 69.43 km^{2} (26.81 sq mi)
- Population (2023): 4,777
  - Density: 68.80/km^{2} (178.2/sq mi)
- Time zone: UTC+01:00 (CET)
  - Summer (DST): UTC+02:00 (CEST)
- INSEE/Postal code: 14027 /14260, 14770
- ^{1} French Land Register data, which excludes lakes, ponds, glaciers > 1 km^{2} (0.386 sq mi or 247 acres) and river estuaries.

Les Monts d'Aunay (French pronunciation: [le mɔ̃ donɛ]; lit. 'The Mounts of Aunay') is a commune in the department of Calvados, northwestern France. It was established on 1 January 2017 by merger of the former communes of Aunay-sur-Odon (the seat), Bauquay, Campandré-Valcongrain, Danvou-la-Ferrière, Ondefontaine, Le Plessis-Grimoult and Roucamps.

== Geography ==
The commune is made up of the following collection of villages and hamlets, Bauquay, Le Pied du Bois, Les Monts d'Aunay, Ondefontaine, Roucamps, Campandré-Valcongrain, Le Plessis-Grimoult and Danvou-la-Ferrière.

The Commune along with another nine communes shares part of a 5,729 hectare, Natura 2000 conservation area, called the Bassin de la Druance.

The commune is the source of both the River Druance and River Odon. In addition to the two rivers, nine streams run through the commune, the Ruisseau d'Herbion, Ruisseau de la Chaine, Ruisseau des Parcs, Ruisseau des Vaux, Ruisseau de Cresme, Ruisseau de Vory, Ruisseau du Val Boquet, Ruisseau de Vory and the Ruisseau de Buharet.

The commune is on the border of the area known as Suisse Normande.

== Population ==
Population data refer to the commune in its geography as of January 2025.

Historical population
| Year | Pop. | ±% p.a. |
|---|---|---|
| 1968 | 4,406 | — |
| 1975 | 4,090 | −1.06% |
| 1982 | 4,157 | +0.23% |
| 1990 | 3,983 | −0.53% |
| 1999 | 4,069 | +0.24% |
| 2007 | 4,267 | +0.60% |
| 2012 | 4,700 | +1.95% |
| 2017 | 4,669 | −0.13% |
| 2023 | 4,777 | +0.38% |
Source: INSEE

== Points of Interest ==
- Forêt domaniale de Valcongrain - is a 375 hectare state forest consisting of deciduous trees such as oaks and beeches, as well as conifers and Scots pines.

=== National Heritage sites ===
- Abbaye De Plessis Grimoult remains of a fourteenth century former abbey listed as a Monument historique in 1928.

=== Architecture contemporaine remarquable ===
- Église Saint-Samson - a church built in 1951 and designed by the architect Pierre Chirol, in 2004 it was awarded the Architecture contemporaine remarquable label. The church features stained glass windows designed by the artist Jacques Le Chevallier and statues by the artist Lucien Fenaux.

== Notable people ==
- Paul Jules Tillaux - (1834 – 904) a physician was born here
- Charles Lelong - (1891 – 1970) a sprinter who represented France at the Olympics, was born here.
- Anaïs Bescond - (born 1984) is a retired biathlete, olympic champion and world champion.

== Twin towns – sister cities ==
Les Monts d'Aunay is twinned with:

- Holsworthy, England, United Kingdom since 1974
- Cepari, Romania since 1999
- Mömbris, Germany since 1989

== See also ==
- Communes of the Calvados department
