= Stoczek, Radzyń County =

Stoczek
- Village
- Location within Poland
- Coordinates: 51°39′49″N 22°42′10″E
- Country: Poland
- Voivodeship: Lublin
- County: Radzyń
- Gmina: Czemierniki
- Elevation: 147 m (482 ft)

Stoczek [ˈstɔt͡ʂɛk] is a village in the administrative district of Gmina Czemierniki, within Radzyń County, Lublin Voivodeship, in eastern Poland.

Aleksander Chudek, a pilot of the Polish No. 303 Squadron of the Royal Air Force, was born in Stoczek and died in Le Plessis-Grimoult in France in 1944.
