= Bauquay =

- Part of Les Monts d'Aunay
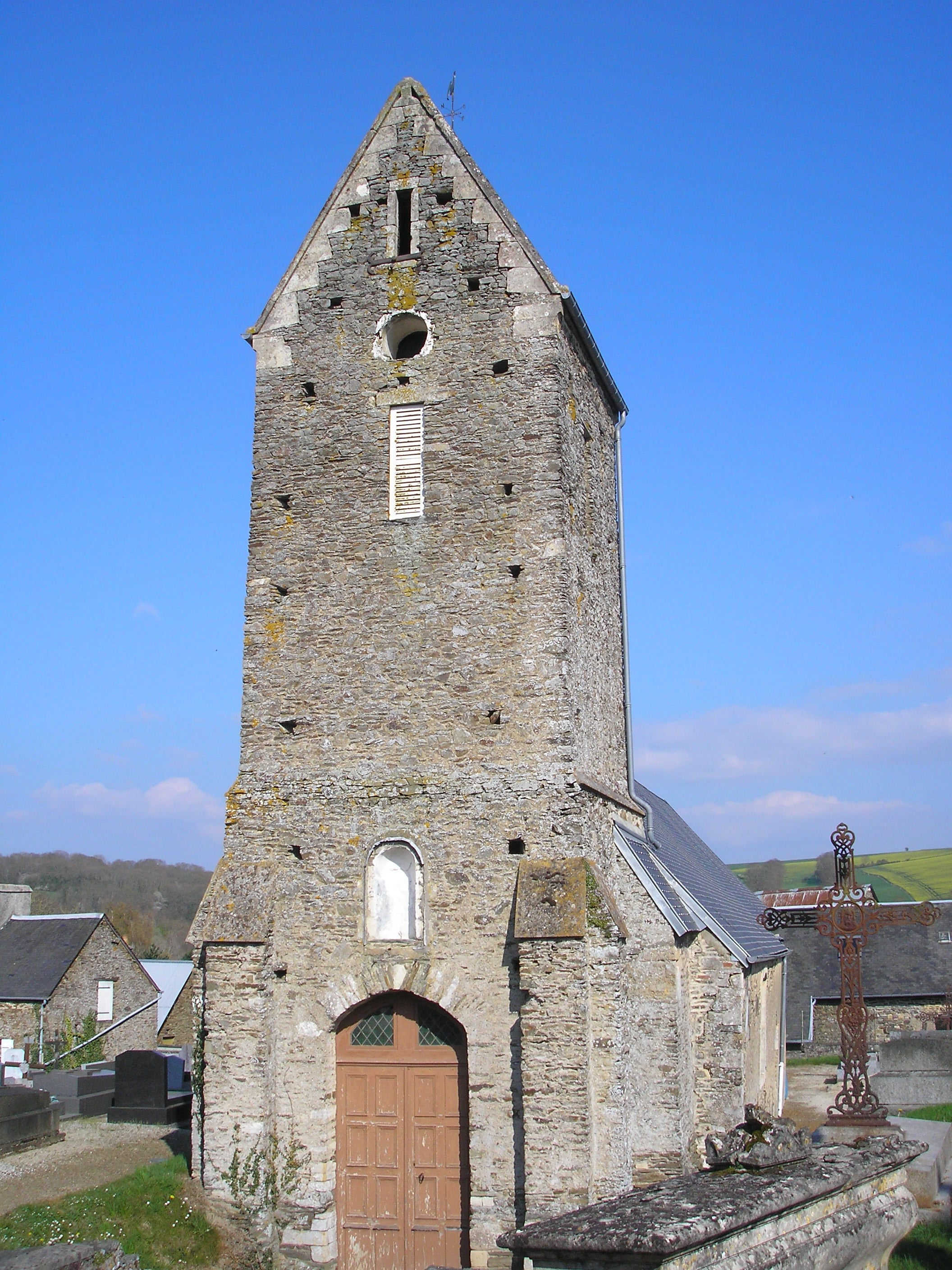
- The Church of Sasint-Mathieu
- Location of Bauquay
- Location within France Location within Normandy
- Coordinates: 49°02′04″N 0°36′53″W
- Country: France
- Region: Normandy
- Department: Calvados
- Arrondissement: Vire
- Canton: Les Monts d'Aunay
- Commune: Les Monts d'Aunay
- Area^{1}: 1.79 km^{2} (0.69 sq mi)
- Elevation: 130 m (430 ft)
- Highest elevation: 163 m (535 ft)
- Lowest elevation: 100 m (330 ft)
- Population (2022): 287
  - Density: 160/km^{2} (415/sq mi)
- Time zone: UTC+01:00 (CET)
  - Summer (DST): UTC+02:00 (CEST)
- Postal code: 14260
- ^{1} French Land Register data, which excludes lakes, ponds, glaciers > 1 km^{2} (0.386 sq mi or 247 acres) and river estuaries.

Bauquay (French pronunciation: [bokɛ]) is a former commune in the Calvados department in the Normandy region of north-western France. On 1 January 2017, it was merged into the new commune Les Monts d'Aunay.

== Geography ==
Bauquay is located some 6 km south by south-east of Villers-Bocage just north-west of Aunay-sur-Odon. Access to the commune is by the D8 road from Aunay-sur-Odon which passes through the length of the commune and the village and continues north-east to Évrecy. Apart from the village there are the hamlets of Le Vloquier and Les Perquettes. The commune is entirely farmland.

The Odon river forms the south-western border of the commune as it flows north to eventually join the Orne at Caen. The Douvette river forms the eastern border of the commune as it flows north then north-west to join the Odon near Longvillers.

Geologically the commune is part of the Armorican Massif.

The climate is oceanic as in all of western France. The nearest weather station is Caen, 21 km 3.

== Toponymy ==
The name of the locality was attested as Balcheium in 1082 The toponym comes from the Gallic balc, meaning "clay", which gave the old French bauche with the same meaning. The place used to supply clay for construction.

Bauquay appears as Beaugnay on the 1750 Cassini Map and the same on the 1790 version.

== Administration ==
List of Successive Mayors

| From | To | Name |
|---|---|---|
| 1995 | 2017 | Gilles Leconte |

The Municipal Council was composed of 11 members including the Mayor and 2 deputies.

== Demography ==
The inhabitants of the commune are known as Buxois or Buxoises in French.

Historical population

| Year | Pop. | ±% p.a. |
|---|---|---|
| 1793 | 100 | — |
| 1800 | 335 | +18.85% |
| 1806 | 422 | +3.92% |
| 1821 | 334 | −1.55% |
| 1831 | 334 | +0.00% |
| 1836 | 332 | −0.12% |
| 1841 | 307 | −1.55% |
| 1846 | 289 | −1.20% |
| 1851 | 294 | +0.34% |
| 1856 | 276 | −1.26% |
| 1861 | 270 | −0.44% |
| 1866 | 227 | −3.41% |
| 1872 | 207 | −1.53% |
| 1876 | 187 | −2.51% |
| 1881 | 190 | +0.32% |
| 1886 | 190 | +0.00% |
| 1891 | 187 | −0.32% |
| 1896 | 170 | −1.89% |

| Year | Pop. | ±% p.a. |
|---|---|---|
| 1901 | 147 | −2.87% |
| 1906 | 158 | +1.45% |
| 1911 | 138 | −2.67% |
| 1921 | 129 | −0.67% |
| 1926 | 132 | +0.46% |
| 1931 | 123 | −1.40% |
| 1936 | 119 | −0.66% |
| 1946 | 118 | −0.08% |
| 1954 | 155 | +3.47% |
| 1962 | 148 | −0.58% |
| 1968 | 132 | −1.89% |
| 1975 | 120 | −1.35% |
| 1982 | 149 | +3.14% |
| 1990 | 151 | +0.17% |
| 1999 | 165 | +0.99% |
| 2007 | 216 | +3.42% |
| 2012 | 296 | +6.50% |
| 2022 | 287 | −0.31% |

Source: EHESS and INSEE

== Sites and monuments ==
- The Church of Saint-Mathieu (12th century) with an 18th-century bell tower.
- An Oratory chapel (19th century)

== Notable people linked to the commune ==
- Renaud Allirand, painter and engraver, lived in the commune from 1974 to 1987.

== See also ==
- Communes of the Calvados department
