= Cepari =

- Commune
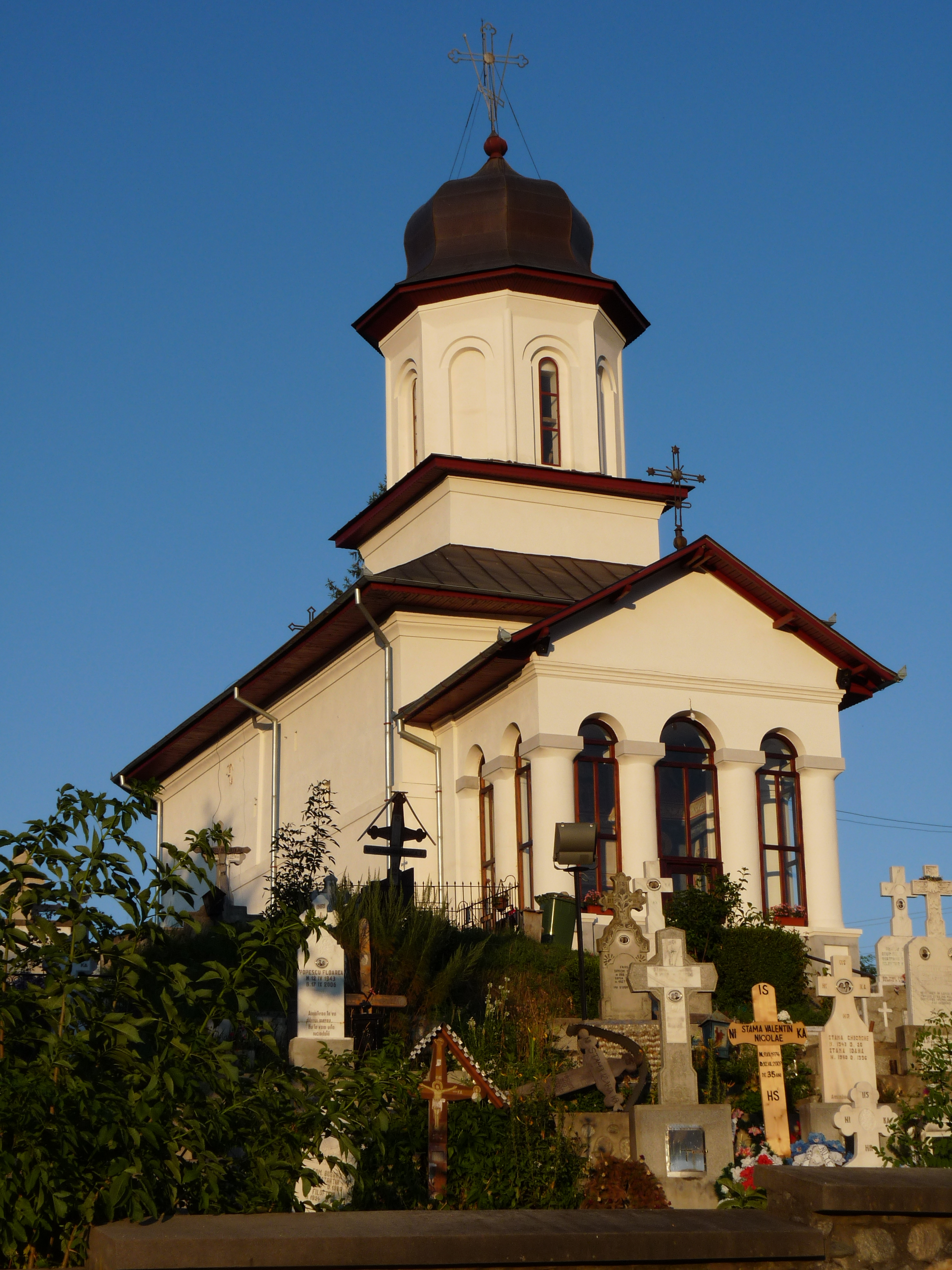
- Romanian Orthodox church in Ceparii Pământeni

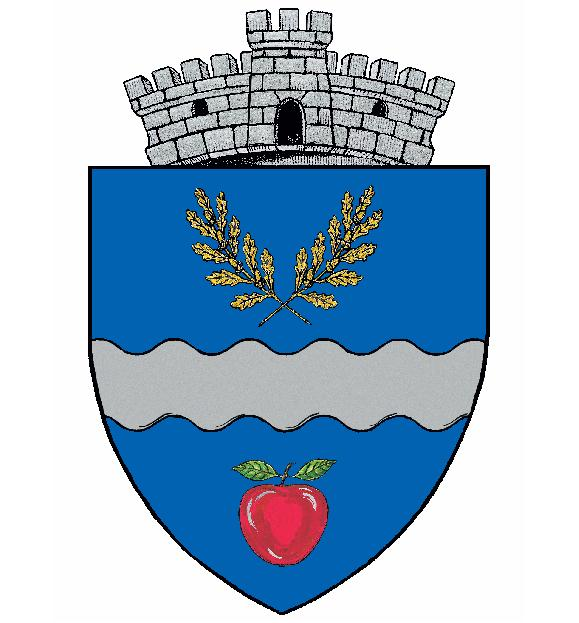
- Coat of arms

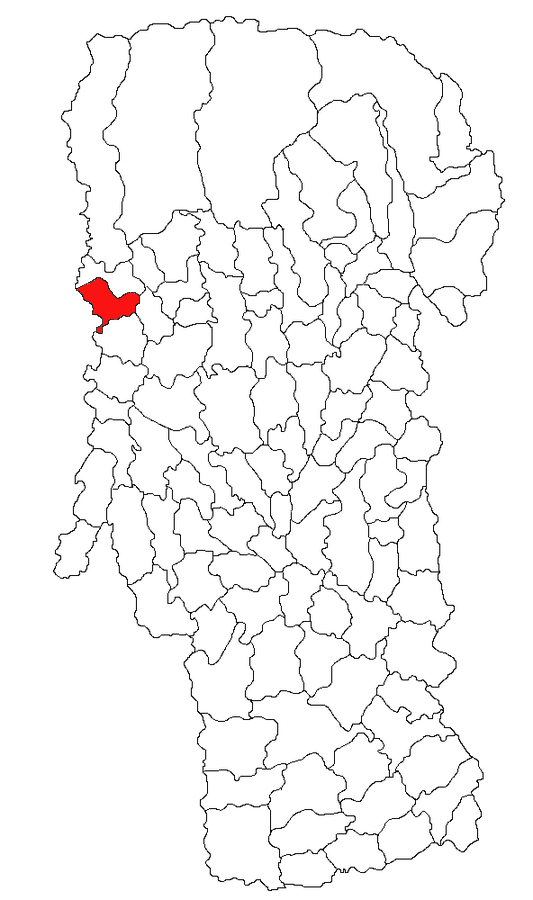
- Location in Argeș County

- Location in Romania
- Coordinates: 44°48′N 24°41′E
- Country: Romania
- County: Argeș

Government
  - Mayor (2024–2028): Alexei-Cristian Ciobanu (PSD)
- Area: 38.62 km^{2} (14.91 sq mi)
- Elevation: 356 m (1,168 ft)
- Population (2021-12-01): 1,900
  - Density: 49/km^{2} (130/sq mi)
- Time zone: UTC+02:00 (EET)
  - Summer (DST): UTC+03:00 (EEST)
- Postal code: 117232
- Area code: (+40) 0248
- Vehicle reg.: AG
- Website: www.primariacepari.ro

Cepari is a commune in Argeș County, Muntenia, Romania. It is composed of eight villages: Cărpeniș, Ceparii Pământeni (the commune centre), Ceparii Ungureni, Morăști, Șendrulești, Urluiești, Valea Măgurei, and Zamfirești.

== Twin towns – sister cities ==
Cepari is twinned with:

- Les Monts d'Aunay, France, United Kingdom since 1999
