= Campandré-Valcongrain =

- Part of Les Monts d'Aunay
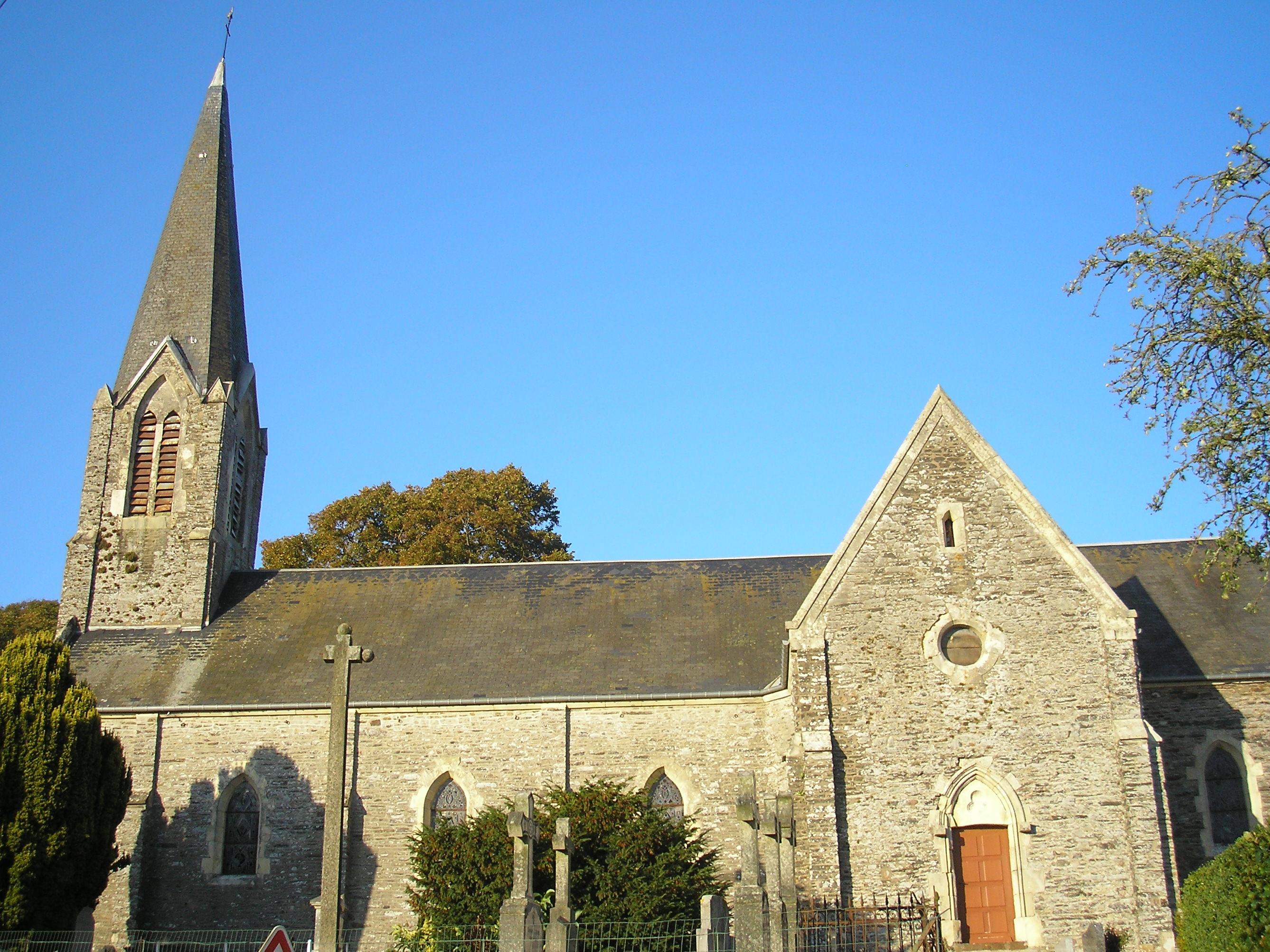
- Location of Campandré-Valcongrain
- Location within France Location within Normandy
- Coordinates: 48°58′40″N 0°35′06″W
- Country: France
- Region: Normandy
- Department: Calvados
- Arrondissement: Caen
- Canton: Les Monts d'Aunay
- Commune: Les Monts d'Aunay
- Area^{1}: 6.57 km^{2} (2.54 sq mi)
- Elevation: 352 m (1,155 ft)
- Highest elevation: 334 m (1,096 ft)
- Lowest elevation: 123 m (404 ft)
- Population (2023): 112
  - Density: 17.0/km^{2} (44.2/sq mi)
- Time zone: UTC+01:00 (CET)
  - Summer (DST): UTC+02:00 (CEST)
- Postal code: 14260
- ^{1} French Land Register data, which excludes lakes, ponds, glaciers > 1 km^{2} (0.386 sq mi or 247 acres) and river estuaries.

Campandré-Valcongrain (French pronunciation: [kɑ̃pɑ̃dʁe valkɔ̃ɡʁɛ̃]) is a former commune in the Calvados department in the Normandy region in northwestern France. On 1 January 2017, it was merged into the new commune Les Monts d'Aunay.

== See also ==
- Communes of the Calvados department
