= Lucien Fenaux =

French sculptor

- Born: 6 August 1911; Hazebrouck, Nord, France
- Died: 1969 (aged 57–58); Neuville-aux-Bois, Loiret, France
- Occupation: Sculptor

Lucien Fenaux (1911-1969) was a French sculptor. He won the Prix de Rome in sculpture in 1943. He lived at the Villa Medici in 1946–1947. He designed sculptures in the church in Aunay-sur-Odon.
