= Courvaudon =

- Commune
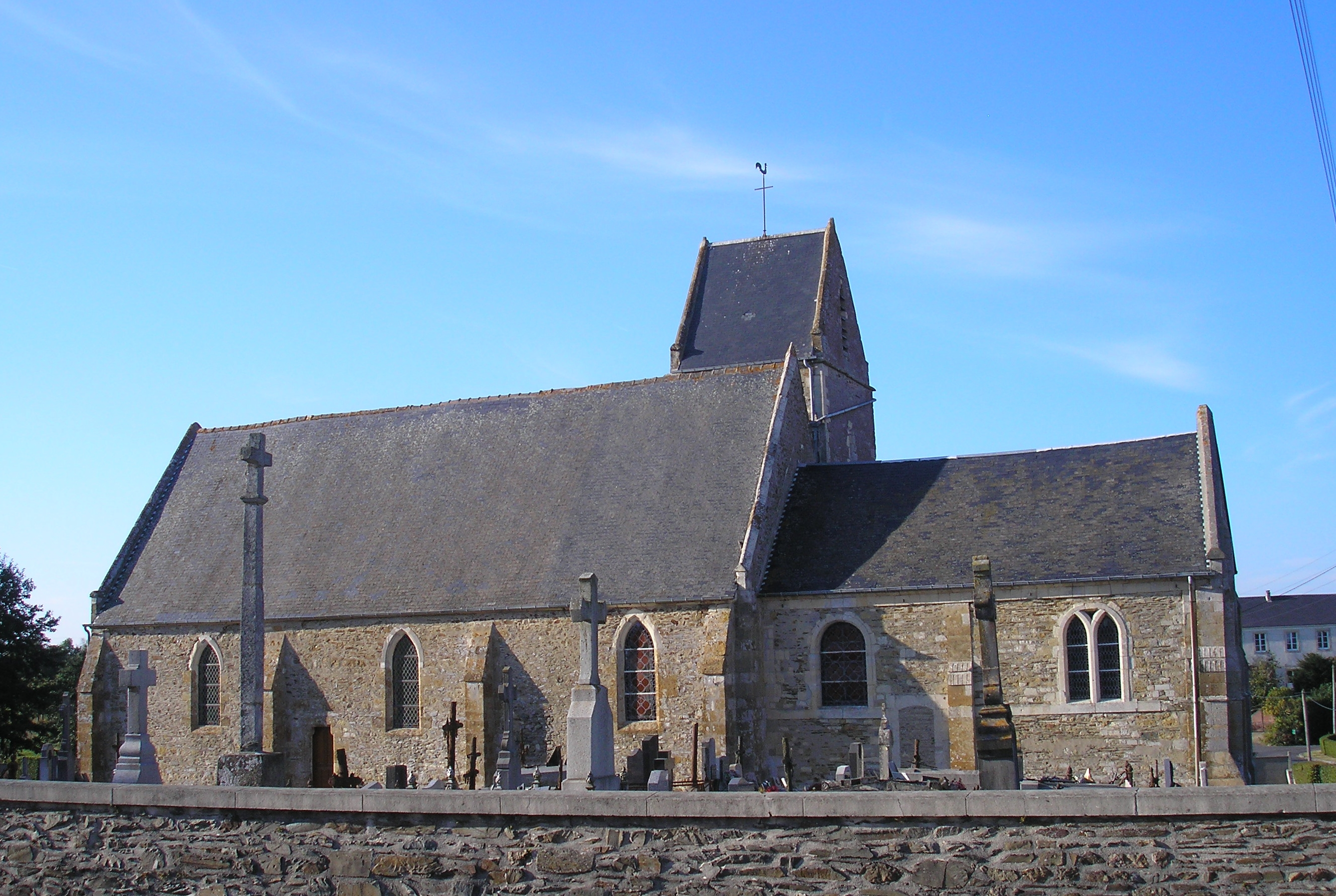
- The church in Courvaudon

- Coat of arms
- Location of Courvaudon
- Location within France Location within Normandy
- Coordinates: 49°01′55″N 0°34′32″W
- Country: France
- Region: Normandy
- Department: Calvados
- Arrondissement: Vire
- Canton: Les Monts d'Aunay
- Intercommunality: Pré-Bocage Intercom

Government
  - Mayor (2020–2026): Sylvie Harivel
- Area^{1}: 9.53 km^{2} (3.68 sq mi)
- Elevation: 230 m (750 ft)
- Highest elevation: 249 m (817 ft)
- Lowest elevation: 137 m (449 ft)
- Population (2023): 291
  - Density: 30.5/km^{2} (79.1/sq mi)
- Time zone: UTC+01:00 (CET)
  - Summer (DST): UTC+02:00 (CEST)
- INSEE/Postal code: 14195 /14260
- ^{1} French Land Register data, which excludes lakes, ponds, glaciers > 1 km^{2} (0.386 sq mi or 247 acres) and river estuaries.

Courvaudon (French pronunciation: [kuʁvodɔ̃]) is a commune in the Calvados department in the Normandy region in northwestern France.

== Geography ==
The commune is made up of the following collection of villages and hamlets, Le Bouillon, Courvaudon and Nidalos.

The commune is on the border of the area known as Suisse Normande.

== Population ==
Historical population
Year	Pop.	±% p.a.
1968	221	—
1975	179	−2.97%
1982	186	+0.55%
1990	219	+2.06%
1999	199	−1.06%
2007	211	+0.73%
2012	212	+0.09%
2017	239	+2.43%
2023	291	+3.34%
Source: INSEE

== See also ==
- Communes of the Calvados department
