= Danvou-la-Ferrière =

- Part of Les Monts d'Aunay
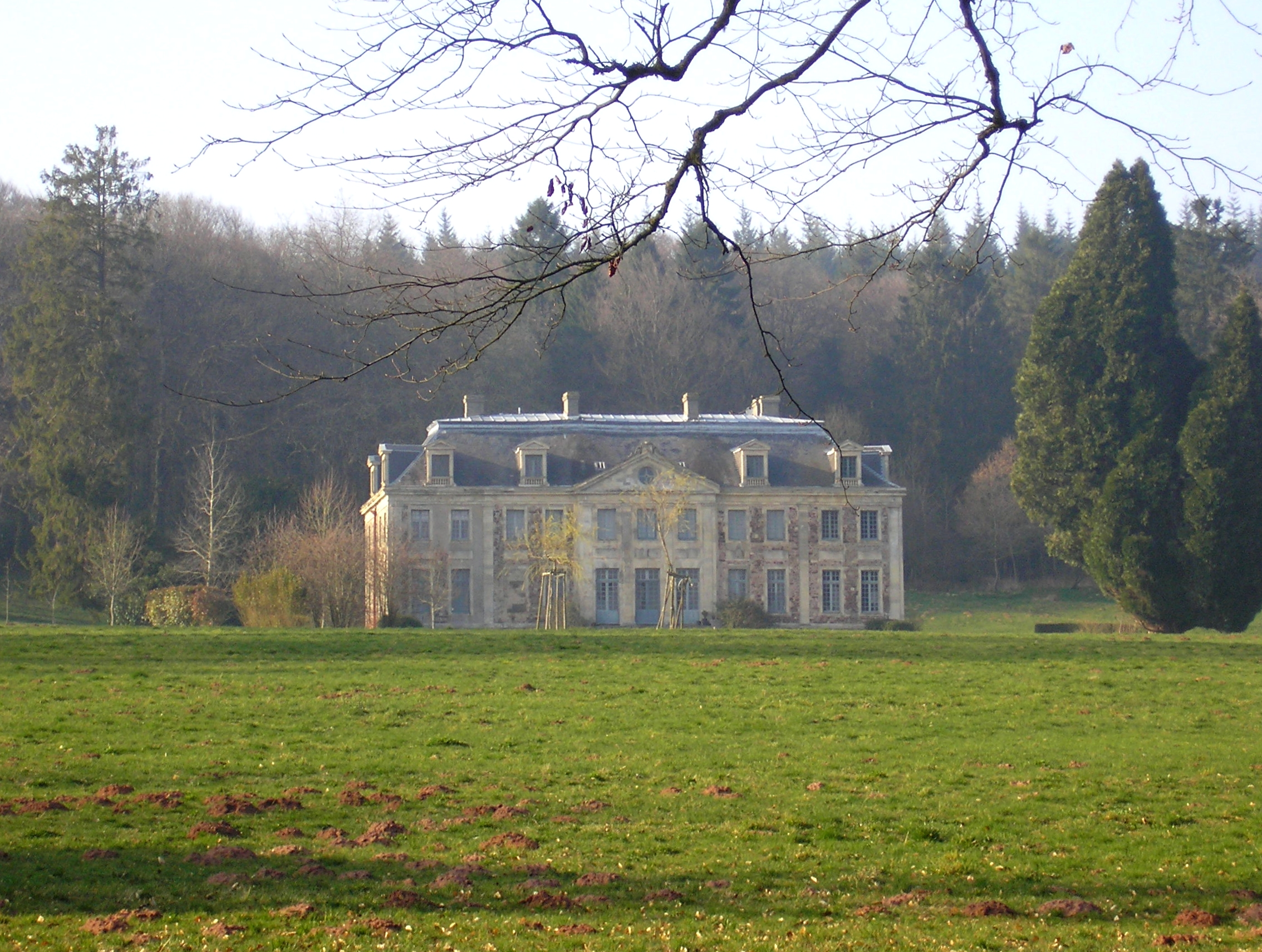
- Château La Ferrière
- Location of Danvou-la-Ferrière
- Location within France Location within Normandy
- Coordinates: 48°57′20″N 0°40′19″W
- Country: France
- Region: Normandy
- Department: Calvados
- Arrondissement: Vire
- Canton: Les Monts d'Aunay
- Commune: Les Monts d'Aunay
- Area^{1}: 11.51 km^{2} (4.44 sq mi)
- Highest elevation: 298 m (978 ft)
- Lowest elevation: 177 m (581 ft)
- Population (2023): 160
  - Density: 14/km^{2} (36/sq mi)
- Time zone: UTC+01:00 (CET)
  - Summer (DST): UTC+02:00 (CEST)
- Postal code: 14770
- ^{1} French Land Register data, which excludes lakes, ponds, glaciers > 1 km^{2} (0.386 sq mi or 247 acres) and river estuaries.

Danvou-la-Ferrière (French pronunciation: [dɑ̃vu la fɛʁjɛʁ]) is a former commune in the Calvados department in the Normandy region in northwestern France. On 1 January 2017, it was merged into the new commune Les Monts d'Aunay.

== See also ==
- Communes of the Calvados department
