= Ondefontaine =

- Part of Les Monts d'Aunay
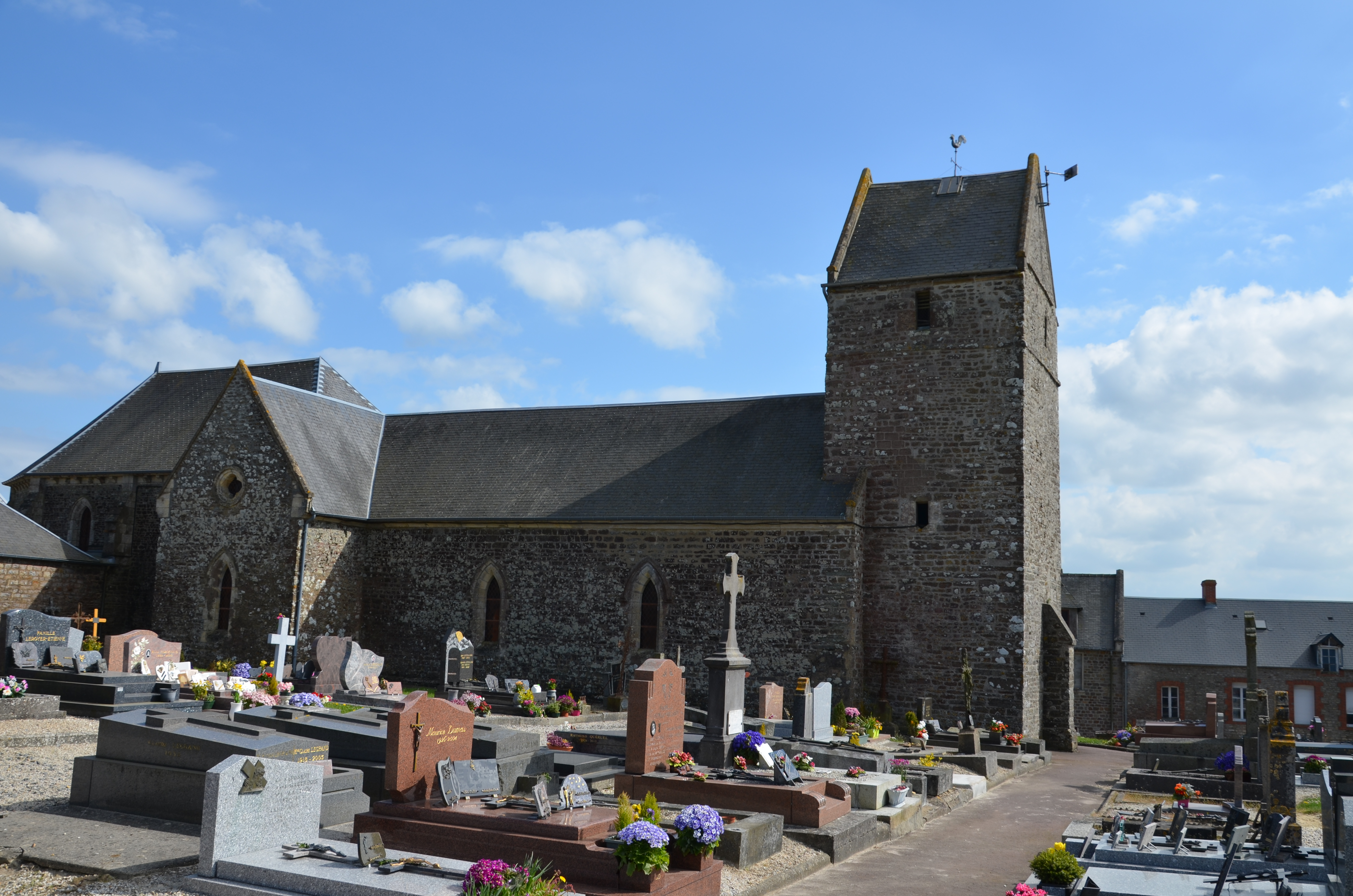
- Location of Ondefontaine
- Location within France Location within Normandy
- Coordinates: 48°59′49″N 0°40′59″W
- Country: France
- Region: Normandy
- Department: Calvados
- Arrondissement: Vire
- Canton: Les Monts d'Aunay
- Commune: Les Monts d'Aunay
- Area^{1}: 15.26 km^{2} (5.89 sq mi)
- Elevation: 311 m (1,020 ft)
- Highest elevation: 325 m (1,066 ft)
- Lowest elevation: 205 m (673 ft)
- Population (2023): 297
  - Density: 19.5/km^{2} (50.4/sq mi)
- Time zone: UTC+01:00 (CET)
  - Summer (DST): UTC+02:00 (CEST)
- Postal code: 14260
- ^{1} French Land Register data, which excludes lakes, ponds, glaciers > 1 km^{2} (0.386 sq mi or 247 acres) and river estuaries.

Ondefontaine (French pronunciation: [ɔ̃dfɔ̃tɛn]) is a former commune in the Calvados department in the Normandy region in northwestern France. On 1 January 2017, it was merged into the new commune Les Monts d'Aunay.

== See also ==
- Communes of the Calvados department
