= Charles Lelong =

French sprinter

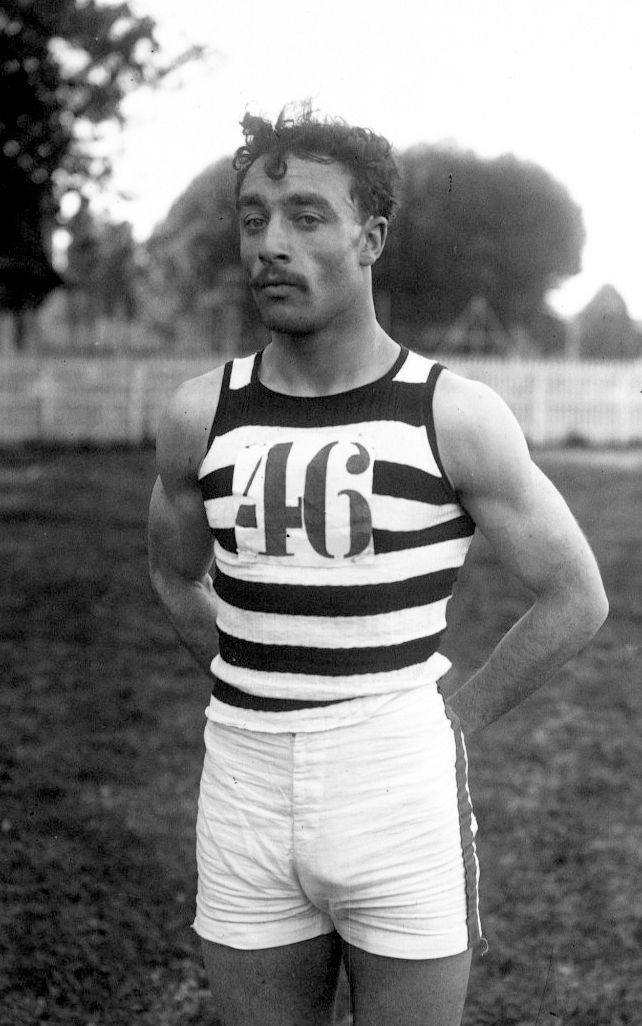
- Charles Lelong in 1912

Personal information
- Born: 18 March 1891 Aunay-sur-Odon, France
- Died: 27 June 1970 (aged 79) Lannion, France

Sport
- Sport: Athletics
- Event: 100–400 m
- Club: Union Sportive Rennes

Achievements and titles
- Personal best: 400 m – 50.2 (1912)
Medal record
Representing France
Olympic Games
Silver medal – second place	1912 Stockholm	4×400 metre relay

Charles Louis Lelong (18 March 1891 – 27 June 1970) was a French sprinter who competed at the 1912 Summer Olympics. He won a silver medal in the 4×400 metre relay and failed to reach the finals of 100 m, 200 m, 400 m and 4×100 metre relay events.
