= Le Plessis-Grimoult =

- Part of Les Monts d'Aunay
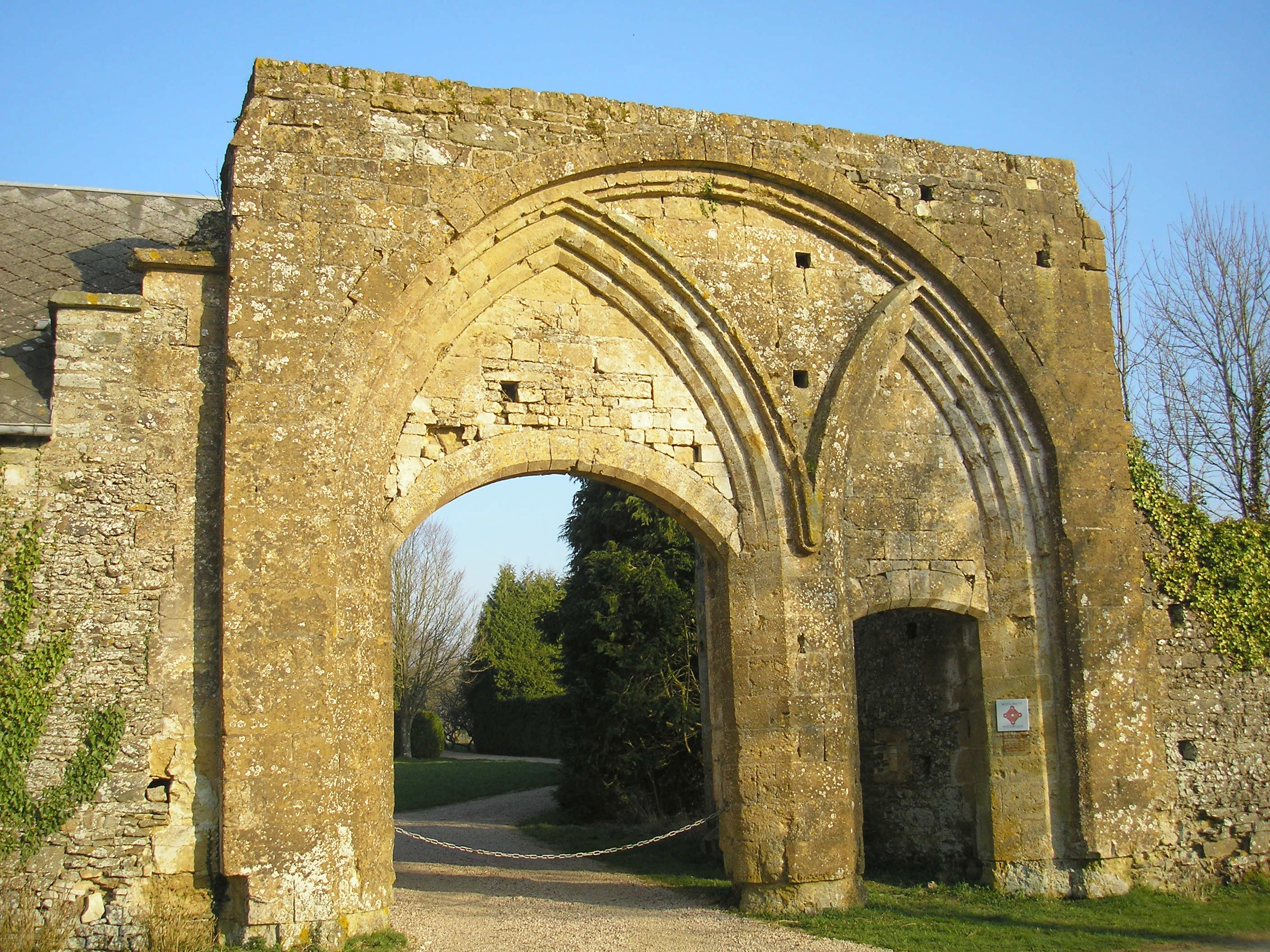
- Abbey ruins

- Coat of arms
- Location of Le Plessis-Grimoult
- Location within France Location within Normandy
- Coordinates: 48°57′43″N 0°36′30″W
- Country: France
- Region: Normandy
- Department: Calvados
- Arrondissement: Vire
- Canton: Condé-en-Normandie
- Commune: Les Monts d'Aunay
- Area^{1}: 16.15 km^{2} (6.24 sq mi)
- Elevation: 300 m (980 ft)
- Highest elevation: 361 m (1,184 ft)
- Lowest elevation: 200 m (660 ft)
- Population (2023): 322
  - Density: 19.9/km^{2} (51.6/sq mi)
- Time zone: UTC+01:00 (CET)
  - Summer (DST): UTC+02:00 (CEST)
- Postal code: 14770
- ^{1} French Land Register data, which excludes lakes, ponds, glaciers > 1 km^{2} (0.386 sq mi or 247 acres) and river estuaries.

Le Plessis-Grimoult (French pronunciation: [lə plɛsi ɡʁimu]) is a former commune in the Calvados department in the Normandy region in northwestern France. On 1 January 2017, it was merged into the new commune Les Monts d'Aunay.

On 23 June 2009, a monument was unveiled in memory of Aleksander Chudek, a Polish pilot from No. 303 RAF Squadron, who died at Le Plessis-Grimoult in 1944.

== See also ==
- Communes of the Calvados department
