= Roucamps =

- Part of Les Monts d'Aunay
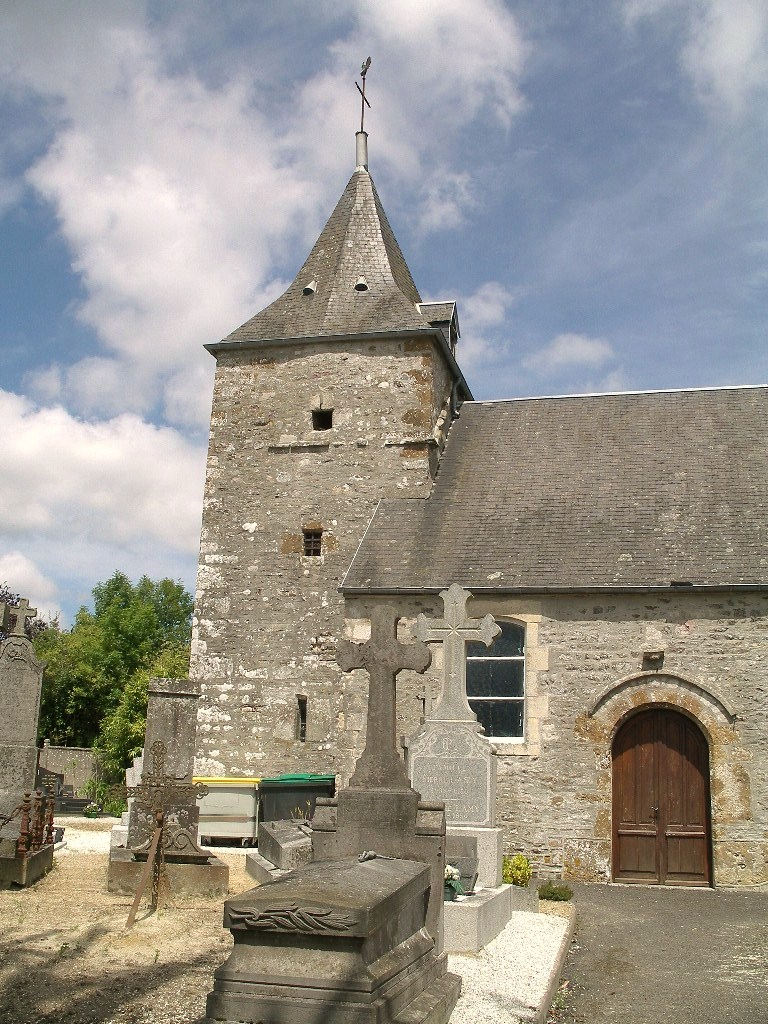
- Location of Roucamps
- Location within France Location within Normandy
- Coordinates: 48°59′27″N 0°37′14″W
- Country: France
- Region: Normandy
- Department: Calvados
- Arrondissement: Vire
- Canton: Les Monts d'Aunay
- Commune: Les Monts d'Aunay
- Area^{1}: 5.41 km^{2} (2.09 sq mi)
- Elevation: 280 m (920 ft)
- Highest elevation: 307 m (1,007 ft)
- Lowest elevation: 203 m (666 ft)
- Population (2023): 224
  - Density: 41.4/km^{2} (107/sq mi)
- Time zone: UTC+01:00 (CET)
  - Summer (DST): UTC+02:00 (CEST)
- Postal code: 14260
- ^{1} French Land Register data, which excludes lakes, ponds, glaciers > 1 km^{2} (0.386 sq mi or 247 acres) and river estuaries.

Roucamps (French pronunciation: [ʁukɑ̃]) is a former commune in the Calvados in the Normandy region in northwestern France. On 1 January 2017, it was merged into the new commune Les Monts d'Aunay.

== See also ==
- Communes of the Calvados department
