= List of senators of Calvados =

Location of Calvados in France

Following is a list of senators of Calvados, people who have represented the department of Calvados in the Senate of France.

== Third Republic ==
Senators for Calvados under the French Third Republic were:

- Édouard Bocher (1876–1894)
- Charles-Pierre-Paul Paulmier (1876–1885)
- Louis de Saint-Pierre (1876–1890)
- Alexandre Lavalley (1885–1892)
- Louis Tillaye (1895–1913)
- Hippolyte Turgis (1890–1904)
- Norbert Anne (1892–1894)
- Paul Duchesne-Fournet (1894–1906)
- Louis Saint-Quentin (1904–1928)
- Henry Chéron (1913–1936)
- Paul Boivin-Champeaux (1907–1925)
- Jean Boivin-Champeaux (1928–1945)
- Charles d'Harcourt (1925–1945)
- Camille Cautru (1936–1945)

== Fourth Republic ==
Senators for Calvados under the French Fourth Republic were:

Term	Name
1946–1948	André Carles
1946–1948	Jean Boivin-Champeaux
1948–1955	Jean Boivin-Champeaux
1948–1955	Louis André
1955–1959	Louis André
1955–1959	Jacques Descours Desacres

== Fifth Republic ==
Senators for Calvados under the French Fifth Republic:

Term	Name	Group	Notes
1959–1962	Jean-Marie Louvel	Union Centriste des Démocrates de Progrès	
1959–1962	Jacques Descours Desacres	Union des Républicains et des Indépendants	
1959–1962	Louis André	Républicains et Indépendants	
1962–1971	Jean-Marie Louvel	Union Centriste des Démocrates de Progrès	Died in office 13 June 1970
1962–1971	Philippe de Bourgoing	Républicains et Indépendants	Replaced Jean-Marie Louvel 6 September 1970
1962–1971	Jacques Descours Desacres	Républicains et des Indépendants	
1962–1971	Louis André	Républicains et Indépendants	
1971–1980	Philippe de Bourgoing	Républicains et Indépendants	
1971–1980	Jacques Descours Desacres	Républicains et des Indépendants	
1971–1980	Jean-Marie Girault	Républicains et Indépendants	
1980–1989	Philippe de Bourgoing	Républicains et Indépendants	
1980–1989	Jacques Descours Desacres	Républicains et des Indépendants	
1980–1989	Jean-Marie Girault	Républicains et Indépendants	
1989–1998	Philippe de Bourgoing	Républicains et Indépendants	
1989–1998	Ambroise Dupont	Union pour un Mouvement Populaire	
1989–1998	Jean-Marie Girault	Républicains et Indépendants	
1998– 2008	Ambroise Dupont	Union pour un Mouvement Populaire	
1998– 2008	Jean-Léonce Dupont	Union Centriste	
1998– 2008	René Garrec	Union pour un Mouvement Populaire	
2008–2014	Ambroise Dupont	Union pour un Mouvement Populaire	
2008–2014	Jean-Léonce Dupont	Union Centriste	
2008–2014	René Garrec	Union pour un Mouvement Populaire	
2014–2020	Pascal Allizard	Les Républicains	
2014–2020	Jean-Léonce Dupont	Union Centriste	Resigned 30 September 2017
2014–2020	Sonia de La Provôté	Union Centriste	From 1 October 2017 in place of M. Jean-Léonce Dupont,
2014–2020	François Aubey	Socialiste et républicain	Election annulled 11 June 2015
2014–2020	Corinne Féret	Socialiste et républicain	From 12 June 2015 in place of François Aubey

== Sources ==
- Liste des anciens sénateurs de la IIIème République par circonscription (in French), Sénat de France
- Liste des anciens sénateurs de la IVème République par circonscription (in French), Sénat de France
- Liste des anciens sénateurs de la Vème République par circonscription (in French), Sénat de France
- Liste par département – Calvados (in French), Sénat de France
