= Café Procope =

Restaurant in Paris, France

Coordinates: 48.852496°N 2.338811°E

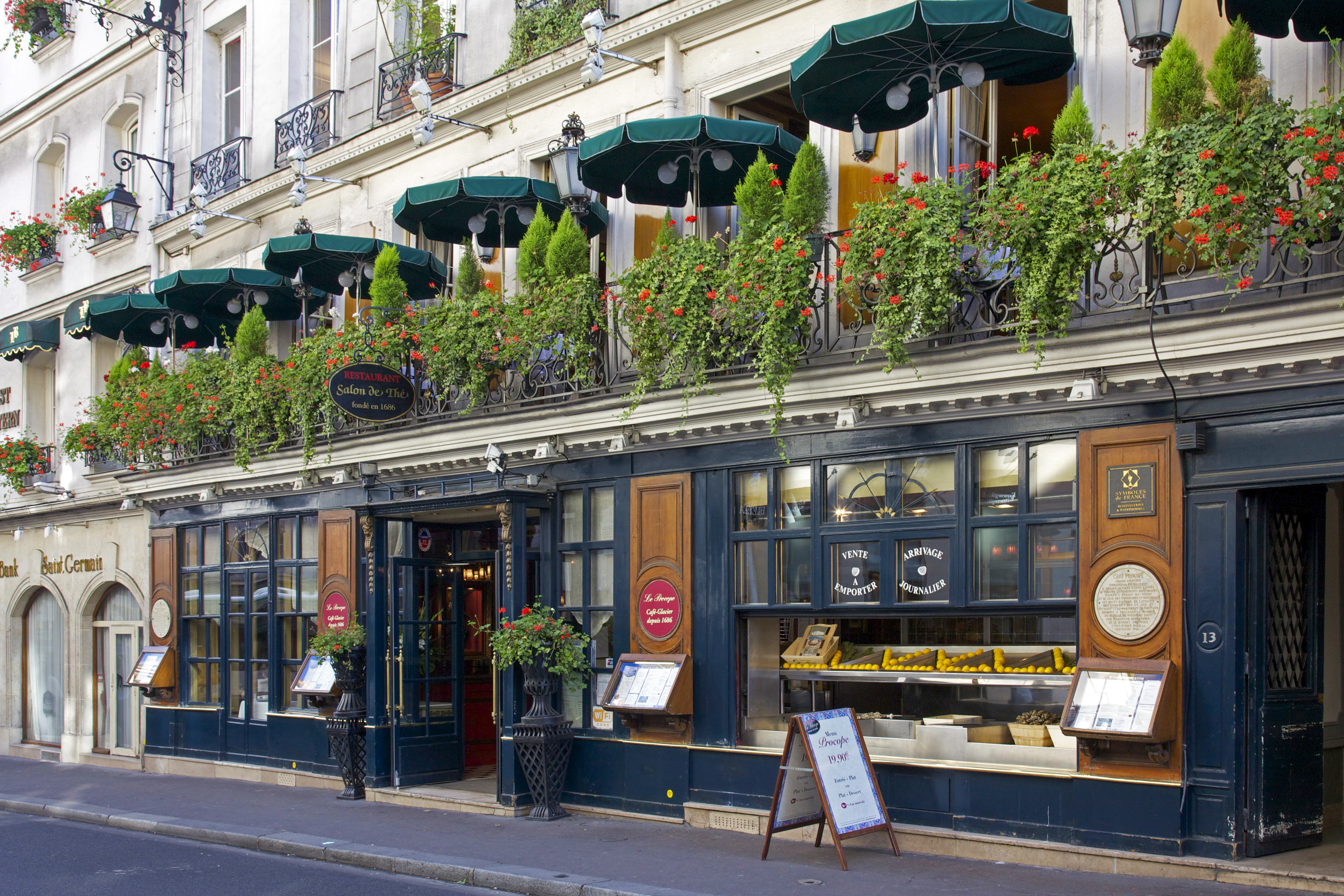
- Café Procope in 2010
- Interactive map of Café Procope

Restaurant information
- Established: 1686
- Previous owner: Francesco Procopio dei Coltelli
- Location: 13 Rue de l'Ancienne Comédie, Paris, France
- Website: www.procope.com

The Café Procope (French pronunciation: [kafe pʁokɔp]), also known as Le Procope ([lə pʁokɔp]), on the Rue de l'Ancienne Comédie, is a café in the 6th arrondissement of Paris. The original café was opened in 1686 by the Sicilian chef Procopio Cutò (also known by his Italian name Francesco Procopio dei Coltelli and his French name François Procope); it became a hub of the Parisian artistic and literary community in 18th and 19th centuries. It sometimes is erroneously called the oldest café in the world in continuous operation (the Queen's Lane Coffee House in Oxford England has been in continuous operation since 1654); however, the original café closed in 1872 and the space was used in various ways before 1957, when the current incarnation (not a café but a restaurant) was opened, so the claim of "oldest café in continuous operation" is not supported.

== Background ==
Procopio Cutò first apprenticed under the leadership of an Armenian immigrant named Pascal who had a kiosk (une loge de la limonade, English: lemonade stand) on rue de Tournon selling refreshments, including lemonade and coffee. Pascal's attempt at such a business in Paris was not successful and he went to London in 1675, leaving the stall to Procopio.

== History ==
Cutò relocated his kiosk in 1686 to rue des Fossés-Saint-Germain-des-Prés. At the beginning, it was referred to as an "antre" (cavern or cave) because it was so dark inside, even when there was bright sunshine outside. Cutò purchased a bath house and had its unique fixtures removed; he installed in his new café items now standard in modern European cafés (crystal chandeliers, wall mirrors, marble tables).

It was a place where gentlemen of fashion might drink coffee, the exotic beverage that had previously been served in taverns, or eat a sorbet, served up in porcelain cups by waiters in exotic "Armenian" garb. The escorted ladies, who appeared at the Café Procope in its earliest days, soon disappeared.

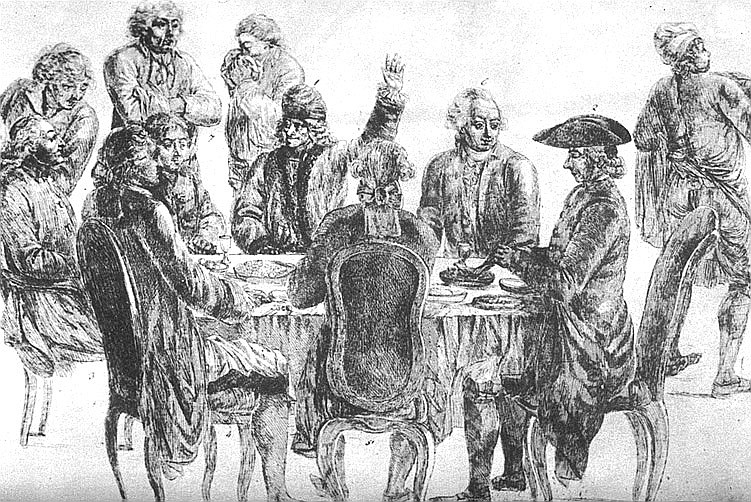
At Café Procope: at rear, from left to right: Condorcet, La Harpe, Voltaire (with his arm raised) and Diderot

In 1689, the Comédie-Française opened its doors in a theatre across the street from his café – hence the street's modern name. By this stroke of fortune, the café attracted many actors, writers, musicians, poets, philosophers, revolutionaries, statesmen, scientists, dramatists, stage artists, playwrights, and literary critics. It was to the Procope, on 18 December 1752, that Rousseau retired, before the performance of Narcisse, his last play, had even finished, saying publicly how boring it all was on the stage, now that he had seen it mounted.

It was the unexampled mix of habitués that surprised visitors, though no-one remarked on the absence of women. Louis, chevalier de Mailly, in Les Entretiens des caffés, 1702, remarked:

The cafés are most agreeable places, and ones where one finds all sorts of people of different characters. There one sees fine young gentlemen, agreeably enjoying themselves; there one sees the savants who come to leave aside the laborious spirit of the study; there one sees others whose gravity and plumpness stand in for merit. Those, in a raised voice, often impose silence on the deftest wit, and rouse themselves to praise everything that is to be blamed, and blame everything that is worthy of praise. How entertaining for those of spirit to see originals setting themselves up as arbiters of good taste and deciding with an imperious tone what is over their depth!

In 1702, Cutò changed his name to the gallicized François Procope, and renamed the business to Café Procope, the name by which it is still known today. Prior to that, it had been known only as the "boutique at the sign of the Holy Shroud of Turin", which was the name of the previous business at the location.

Throughout the 18th century, the brasserie Procope was the meeting place of the intellectual establishment, and of the nouvellistes of the scandal-gossip trade, whose remarks at Procope were repeated in the police reports. Not all the Encyclopédistes drank forty cups of coffee a day like Voltaire, who mixed his with chocolate, but they all met at Café Procope, as did Benjamin Franklin, John Paul Jones and Thomas Jefferson.

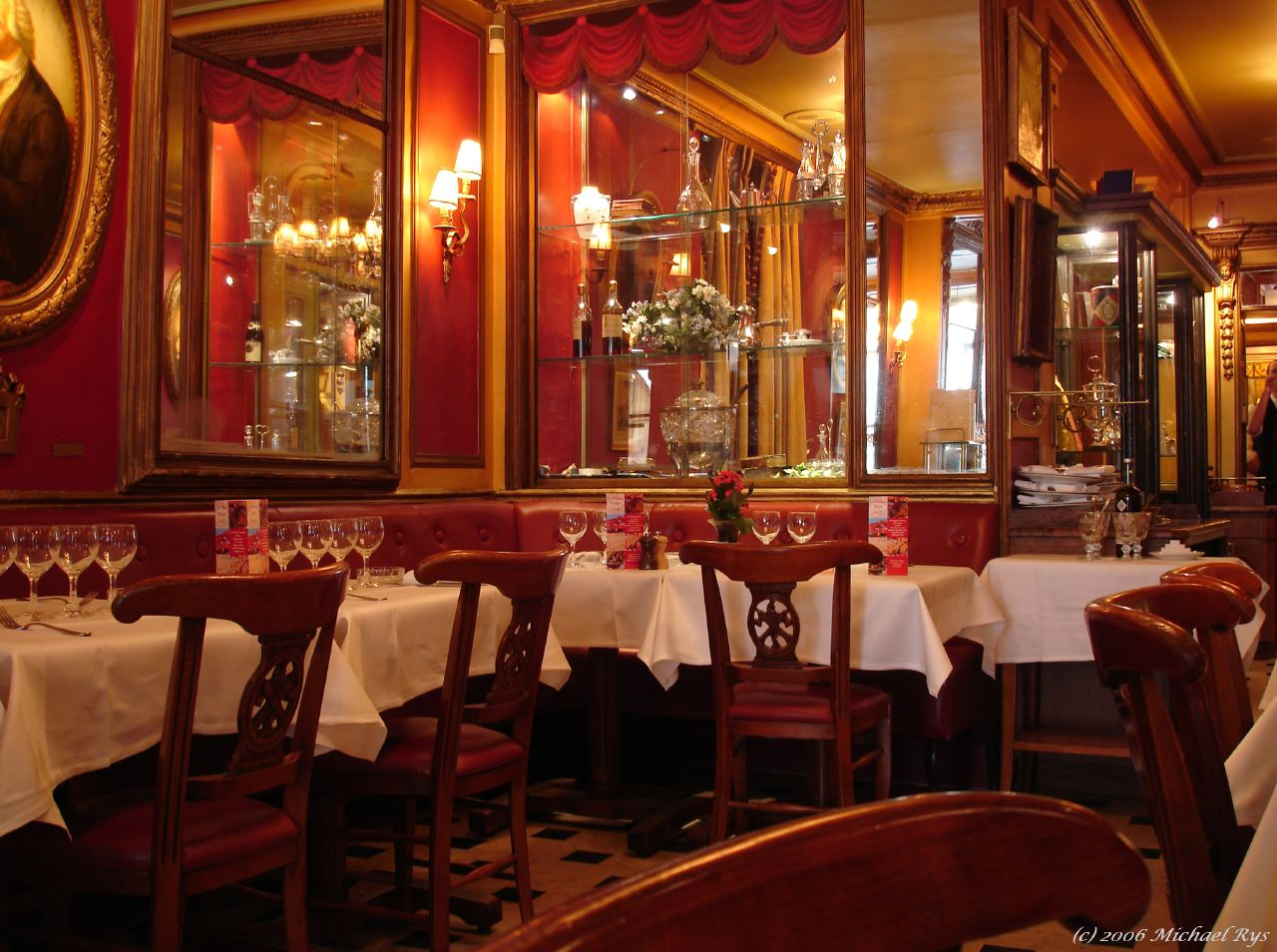
Le Procope is in 18th-century style

There are words above the door at Cutò's establishment that read: Café à la Voltaire. Voltaire is known to have said, "Ice cream is exquisite. What a pity it isn’t illegal."

The birthplace of the Encyclopédie, conceived by Denis Diderot and Jean le Rond d'Alembert, is said to be at Café Procope.

Alain-René Lesage described the hubbub at Procope in La Valise Trouvée (1772): "There is an ebb and flow of all conditions of men, nobles and cooks, wits and sots, pell mell, all chattering in full chorus to their heart's content", indicating an increasingly democratic mix. Writing a few years after the death of Voltaire, Louis-Sébastien Mercier noted:

All the works of this Paris-born writer seem to have been made for the capital. It was foremost in his mind when he wrote. While composing, he was looking towards the French Academy, the public of Comédie française, the Café Procope, and a circle of young musketeers. He hardly ever had anything else in sight.

During the Revolution, the Phrygian cap, soon to be the symbol of Liberty, was first displayed at the Procope. The Cordeliers, Robespierre, Danton and Marat all used the café as a meeting place. After the Restoration, another famous customer was Alexander von Humboldt who, during the 1820s, lunched there every day from 11am to noon. The Café Procope retained its literary cachet; Alfred de Musset, George Sand, Gustave Planche, the philosopher Pierre Leroux, M. Coquille, editor of Le Monde, Anatole France and Mikael Printz were all regulars. Under the Second Empire, August Jean-Marie Vermorel of Le Reforme or Léon Gambetta would expound their plans for social reform.

In the 1860s, the Conférence Molé held its meetings at the Café Procope. Léon Gambetta, like many other French orators, learned the art of public speaking at the Molé. Other active members during this period included Ernest Picard, Clément Laurier and Léon Renault.

A plaque at the establishment claims that it is the oldest continually-functioning café in the world.

Café Procope. Here founded Procopio dei Coltelli in 1686 the oldest coffeehouse of the world and the most famous center of the literary and philosophic life of the 18th and 19th centuries. It was frequented by La Fontaine, Voltaire and the Encyclopedistes: Benjamin Franklin, Danton, Marat, Robespierre, Napoleon Bonaparte, Balzac, Victor Hugo, Gambetta, Verlaine and Anatole France.

However, the claim is not entirely true. The original Café Procope closed its doors in 1872, and the property was acquired by a woman by the name of Baronne Thénard, who leased it to a Théo Bellefonds, under the condition that he preserved the café's atmosphere. Bellefonds opened a private artist's club and established a journal entitled Le Procope, neither of which were very successful. The premises then became the Restaurant Procope, and in the 1920s, it was changed back to a café called Au Grand Soleil. At some point, a new owner realised the marketing value of the original name and rechristened it Café Procope. In 1988–89, the Café Procope was refurbished in an 18th-century style.

== Gallery ==
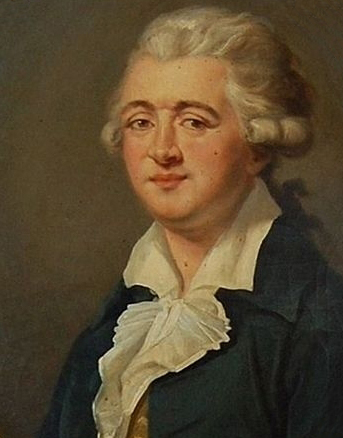
Francesco Procopio
dei Coltelli – founder

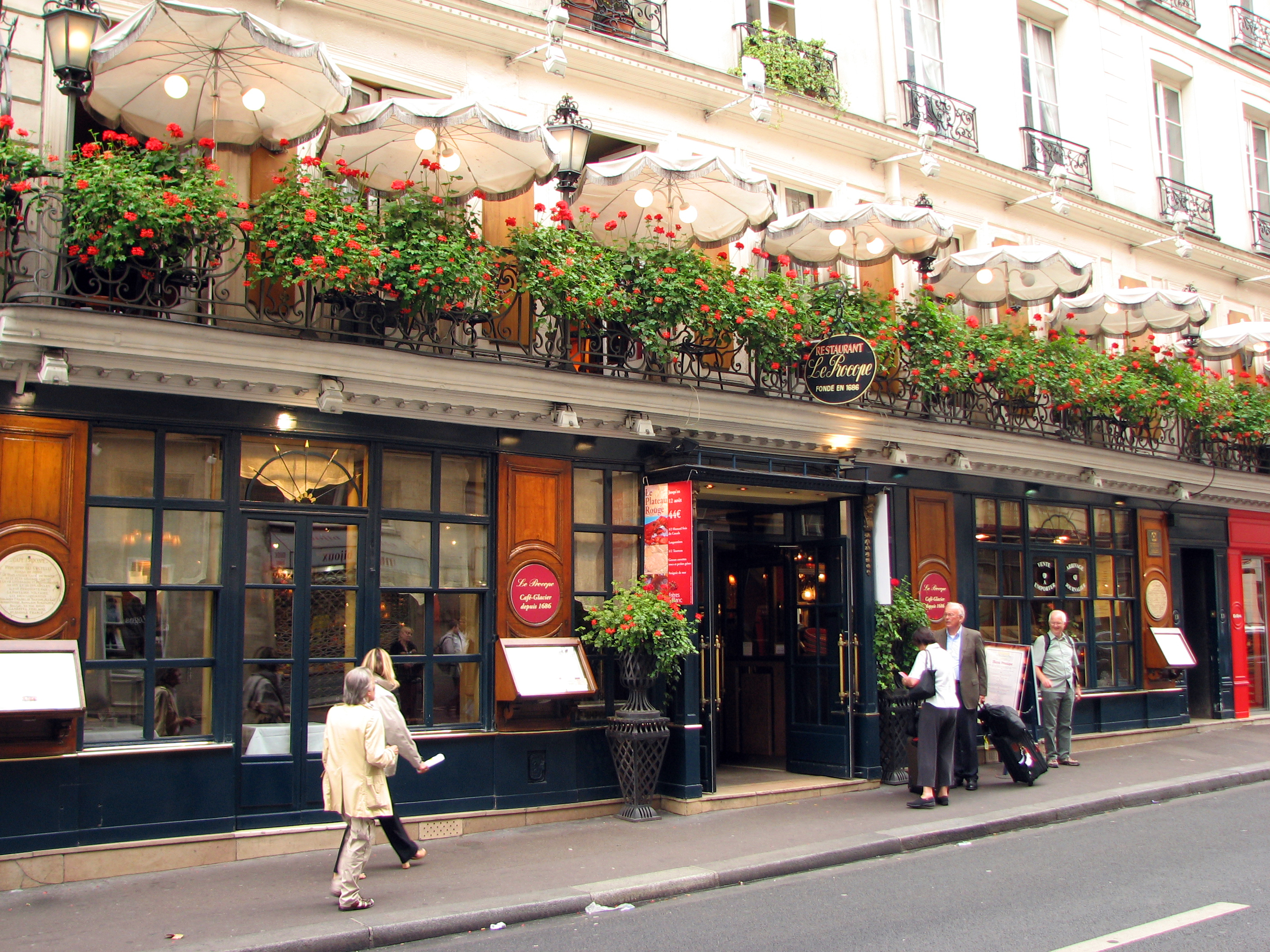
St. Germain des Prés – Café Le Procope

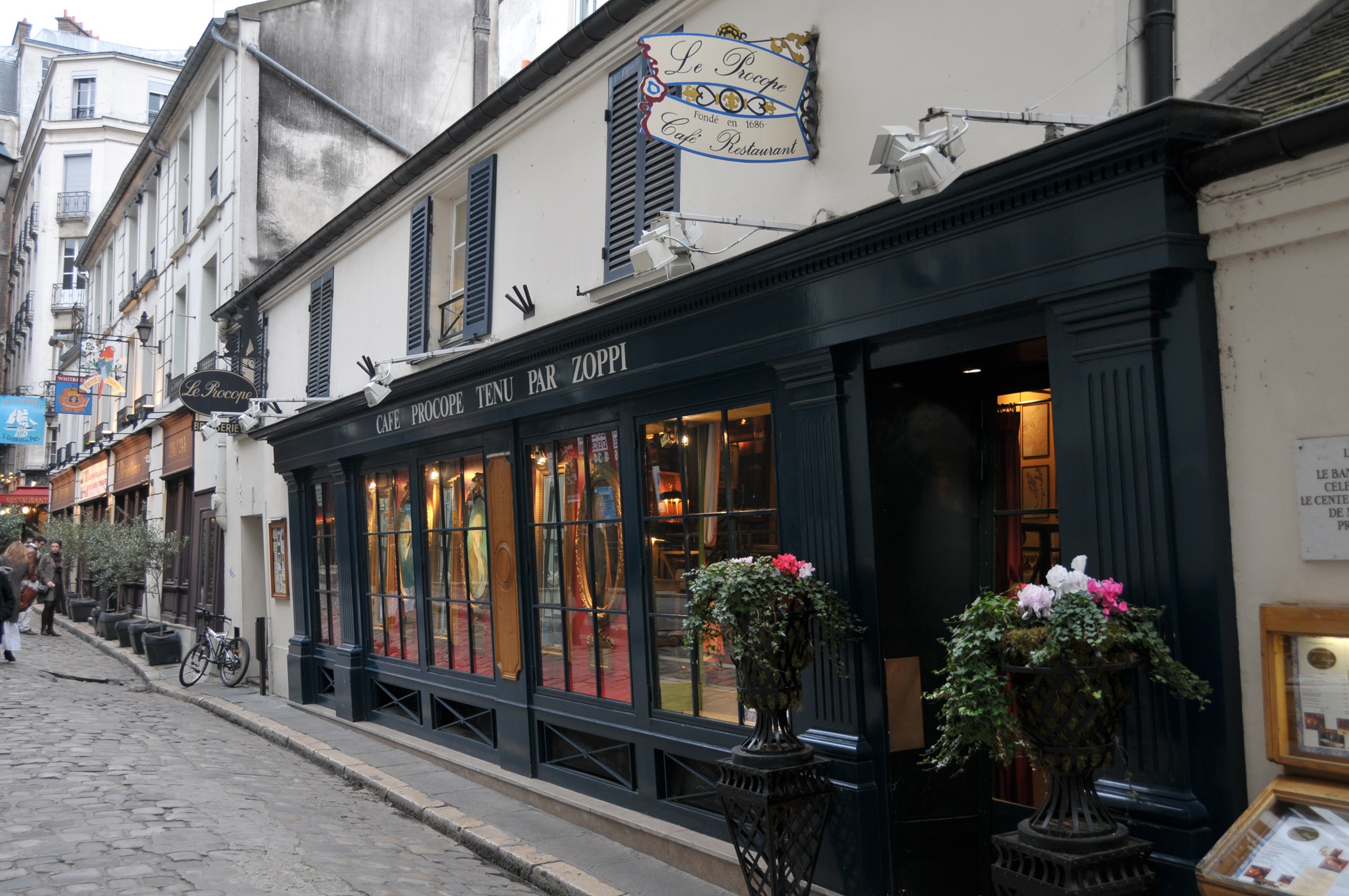
Café Procope, photo of the entrance at Cour du commerce Saint-André

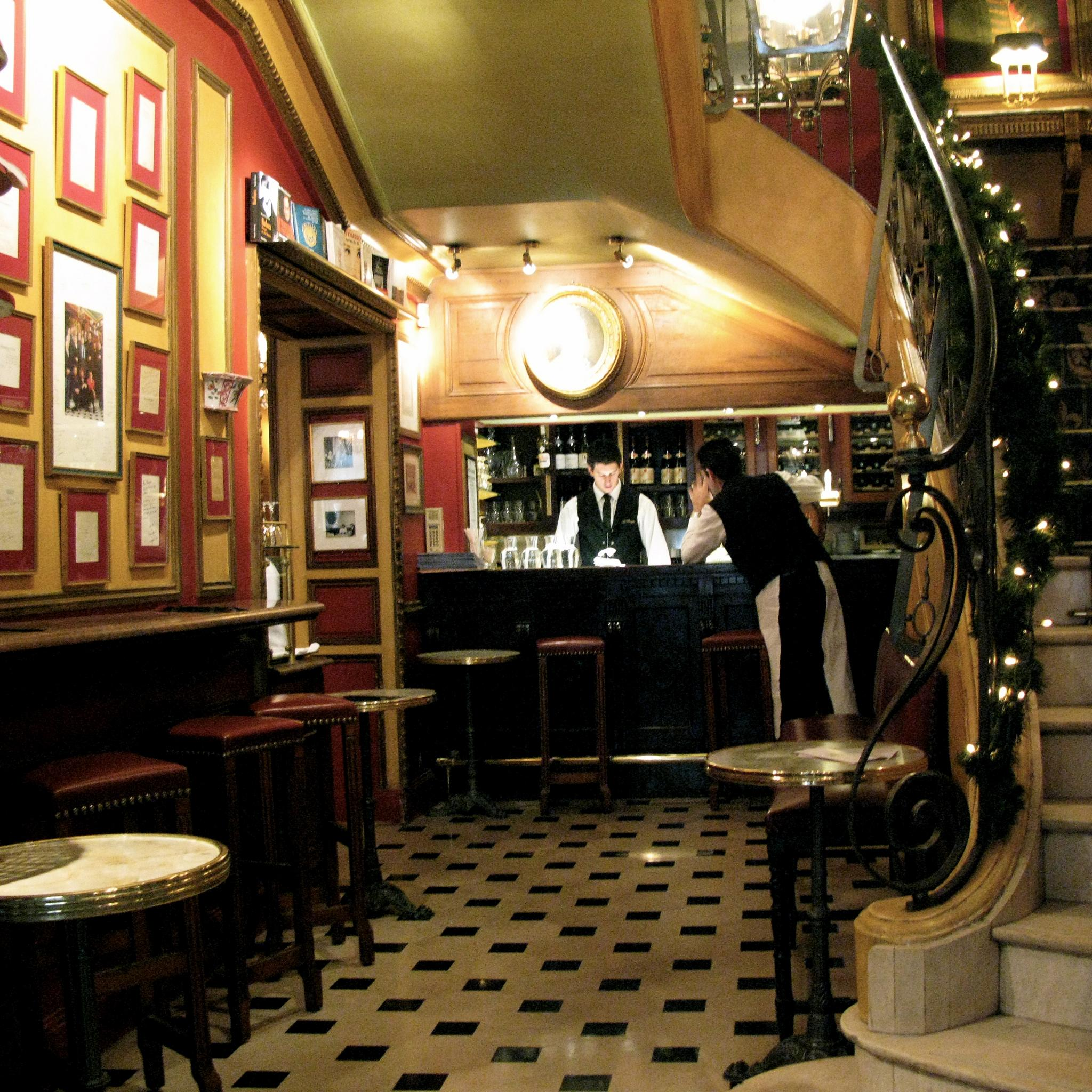
Café Procope bar

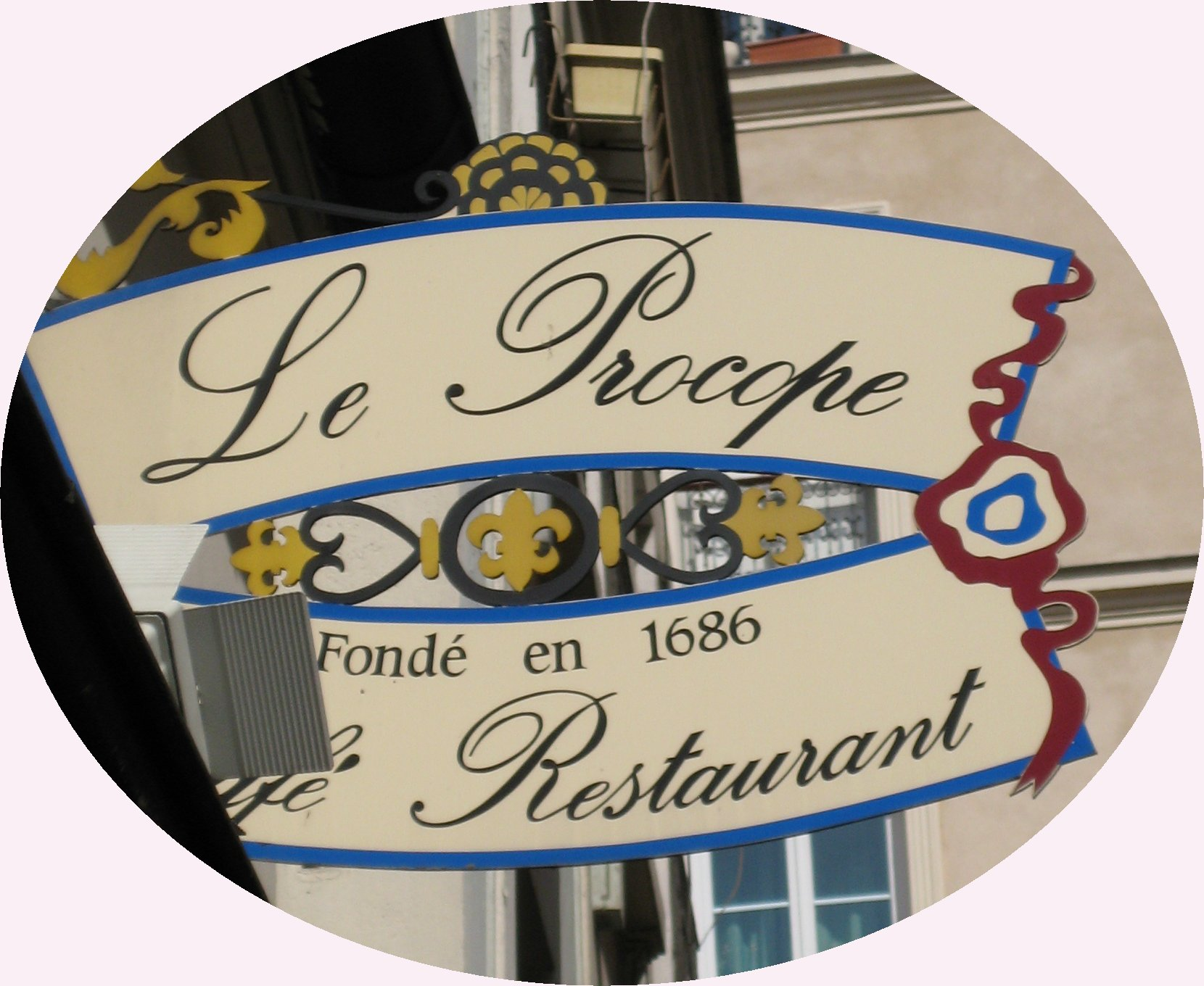
First public café in Paris

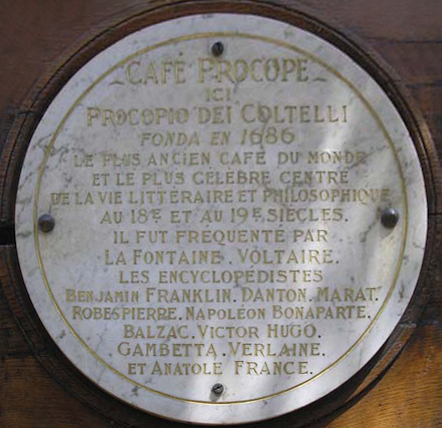
World's oldest café

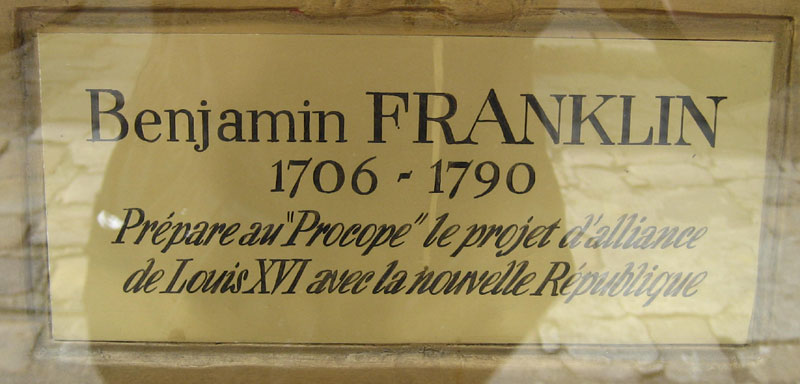
Plaque commemorating Benjamin Franklin's preparation of a Franco-American alliance in the café

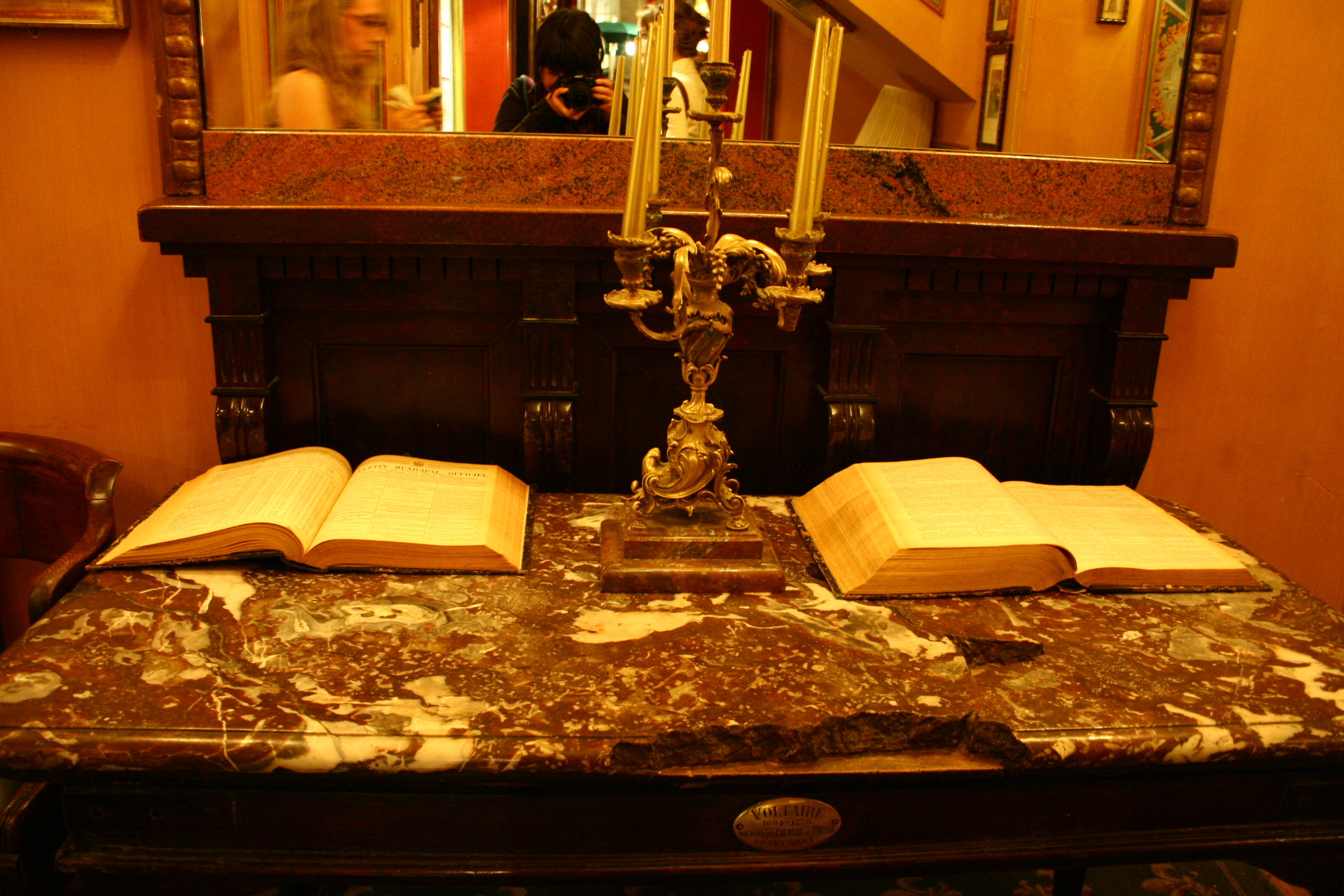
Voltaire's desk

== See also ==
- List of oldest companies
- Parisian cafés
- Café de Flore
- Les Deux Magots
- Latin Quarter
- Jacobins
- Pompeian Red
