= Hippolyte Carnot =

French statesman (1801–1888)

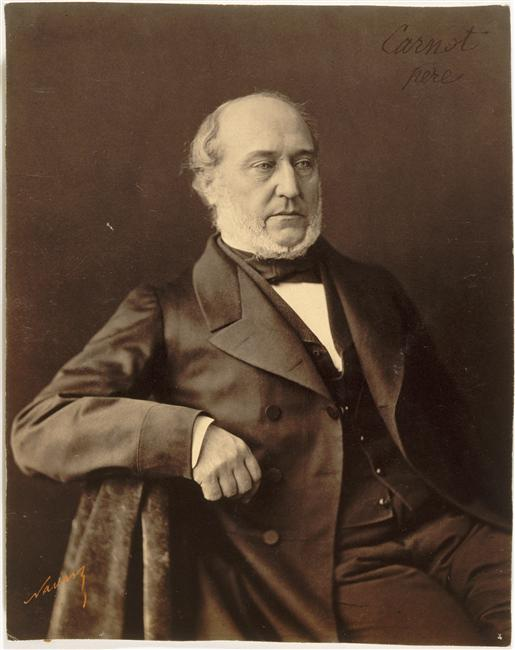
Lazare Hippolyte Carnot

Lazare Hippolyte Carnot (English: /kɑːrˈnoʊ/ kar-NOH, French: [lazaʁ ipɔlit kaʁno]; 6 de Abril de 1801, Saint-Omer – 16 March 1888) was a French politician. He was the younger brother of the founder of thermodynamics Sadi Carnot and the second son of the revolutionary politician and general Lazare Carnot, who also served in the government of Napoleon, as well as the father of French president Marie François Sadi Carnot.

== Early life ==
Hippolyte Carnot was born in Saint-Omer, Pas-de-Calais. After the final defeat of Napoleon in 1815, his father went into exile. Hippolyte Carnot lived at first in exile with his father, returning to France only in 1823. Unable to enter active political life, he turned to literature and philosophy, publishing in 1828 a collection of Chants helléniens translated from the German of Wilhelm Müller, and in 1830 an Exposé de la doctrine Saint-Simonienne, and collaborating in the Saint-Simonian journal Le Producteur. He paid several visits to Britain and travelled in other countries of Europe.

== Overview ==
In March 1839 after the dissolution of the chamber by Louis Philippe I, he was elected deputy for Paris (re-elected in 1842 and in 1846), and sat in the group of the Radical Left, being one of the leaders of the party hostile to Louis Philippe. On 24 February 1848 he pronounced in favour of the republic. Alphonse de Lamartine chose him as minister of education in the provisional government, and Carnot set to work to organize the primary school systems, proposing a law for obligatory and free primary instruction, and another for the secondary education of girls. He opposed purely secular schools, holding that "the minister and the schoolmaster are the two columns on which rests the edifice of the republic." By this attitude he alienated both the Right and the Republicans of the Extreme Left, and was forced to resign on 5 July 1848. He was one of those who protested against the coup d'état of 2 December 1851 but was not proscribed by Napoleon III. He refused to sit in the Corps Législatif until 1864, in order not to have to take the oath to the emperor.

From 1864 to 1869 he was in the republican opposition, taking a very active part. He was defeated at the election of 1869. On 8 February 1871 he was elected deputy for the Seine-et-Oise département. He joined the Gauche républicaine parliamentary group and participated in the drawing up of the Constitutional Laws of 1875. On 16 December 1875 he was named by the National Assembly senator for life.

He died three months after the election of his elder son, Marie François Sadi Carnot, to the presidency of the republic.

He had published Le Ministère de l'Instruction Publique et des Cultes, depuis le 24 février jusqu'au 5 juillet 1848, Mémoires sur Carnot par son fils (2 vols., 1861–1864), Mémoires de Barère de Vieuzac (with David d'Angers, 4 vols 1842–1843).

His second son, Marie Adolphe Carnot (b. 1830), became a distinguished mining engineer and director of the École des Mines (1899), his studies in analytical chemistry placing him in the front rank of French scientists. He was made a member of the Academy of Sciences in 1895.

== Sources ==
- Vermorel, Les Hommes de 1848 (3rd ed., 1869);
- Spuller, Histoire parlementaire de la Seconde Republique (1891);
- Pierre de La Gorce, Histoire du Second Empire (1894 et seq.).
