= Nicolas Carnot =

Nicolas Carnot (English: /kɑːrˈnoʊ/, French: [kaʁno]) may refer to:

- Lazare Nicolas Marguerite Carnot (1753–1823), French statesman and mathematician
- Nicolas Léonard Sadi Carnot (1796–1832), French physicist, son of above
