= Canton of Caen-4 =

Coordinates: 49.17°N 0.35°W

Caen-4
- Canton
- Interactive map of Caen-4
- Country: France
- Region: Normandy
- Department: Calvados
- No. of communes: {{{nbcomm}}}

Government
  - Representatives (2021–2028): Martine Kerguélen; Francis Joly
- Population (2023): 28,303
- INSEE code: 14 08

The canton of Caen-4 is an administrative division of the Calvados department, northwestern France. Its borders were modified at the French canton reorganisation which came into effect in March 2015. Its seat is in Caen.

== Composition ==
It consists of the following communes:

1. Caen (partly)

== Councillors ==
| Election | Councillors | Party | Occupation |
|---|---|---|---|
| 2015 | Gilles Déterville | PS | Councillor of Caen |
| 2015 | Corinne Féret | PS | Member of the French Senate |
| 2021 | Francis Joly | EELV | Councillor of Caen |
| 2021 | Martine Kerguélen | PS | Accountant |
