= Édouard Bocher =

French politician (1811–1900)

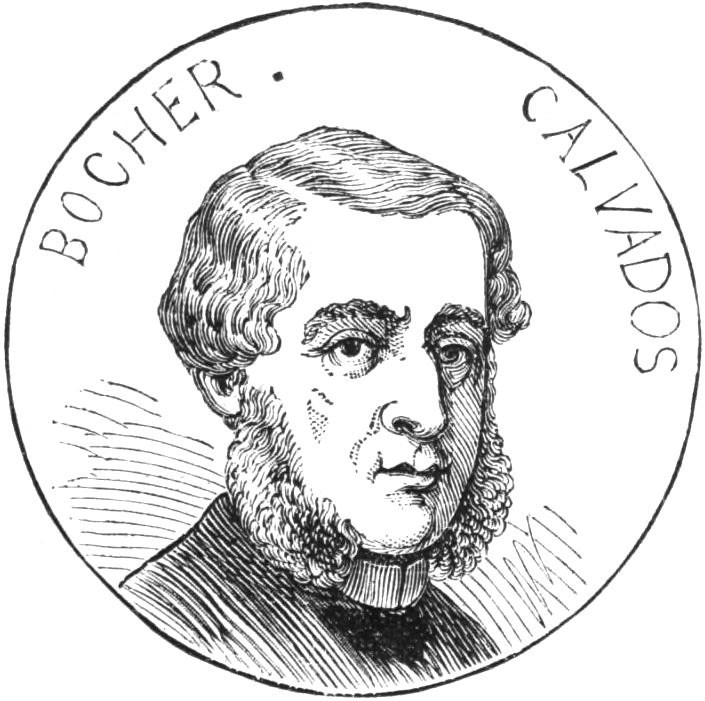

Senator of Calvados
- In office 1876–1894

Personal details
- Born: Pierre Henri Édouard Bocher; 16 February 1811 Paris, France
- Died: 2 May 1900 (aged 89) Paris, France

Pierre Henri Édouard Bocher (16 February 1811, Paris - 2 May 1900, Paris) was a French politician.

== Life ==
Édouard Bocher was born on 16 February 1811 in Paris, son of a Parisianstockbroker. He was among the twenty founders of the Conférence Molé debating society on 19 March 1832. Four of them later became members of the Council of State including Prosper Hochet, Mortimer Ternaux, Achille Guilhem and Édouard Bocher. he became auditor to the Conseil d'État in 1833 and sub-prefect for Étampes in 1834. In 1834 he married Aline de Laborde (1811-1885), second daughter of comte Alexandre de Laborde and an accomplished lady of letters. They had two children:

- Emmanuel Bocher (1835-1919), officer, writer, pianist, painter, editor of the complete works of Gavarni and great friend of Sarah Bernhardt
- Valentin Bocher (1840-1849)

In 1839 Édouard Bocher was made prefect for Gers, then in 1841 for Toulouse and in 1842 for Caen. In 1848 he stopped being prefect for Calvados and in 1849 he became deputy for that department, sitting on the right. He protested against the 1851 coup. Opposed to the Second French Empire, he and others were put in charge of dealing with the property of Louis-Philippe I and his family.

In 1871 he was elected to represent Calvados, sitting in the centre-right group, of which he became president. He was senator for Calvados from 1876 to 1894, sitting on the right.

A great book collector, he assembled an extensive collection of rare books. He was a close friend of Alfred de Musset, who dedicated one of his first poems to him.

== Bibliography ==
- François d'Ormesson and Jean-Pierre Thomas, Jean-Joseph de Laborde, banquier de Louis XV, mécène des Lumières, Paris, Perrin, 2002, p. 294-295 - (ISBN 2-262-01820-0)
- Martin-Frugier, Anne (April–June 1989), "La formation des élites: les "conférences" sous la Restauration et la Monarchie de Juillet", Revue d'histoire moderne et contemporaine (in French), 36 (2), Societe d'Histoire Moderne et Contemporaine: 211–244, doi:10.3406/rhmc.1989.1491, JSTOR 20529584
- Robert, Adolphe; Cougny, Gaston (1889), "Édouard Bocher", dictionnaire des parlementaires français de 1789 à 1889 (in French)
