= Nicolas Clément =

French physicist and chemist (1779–1841)

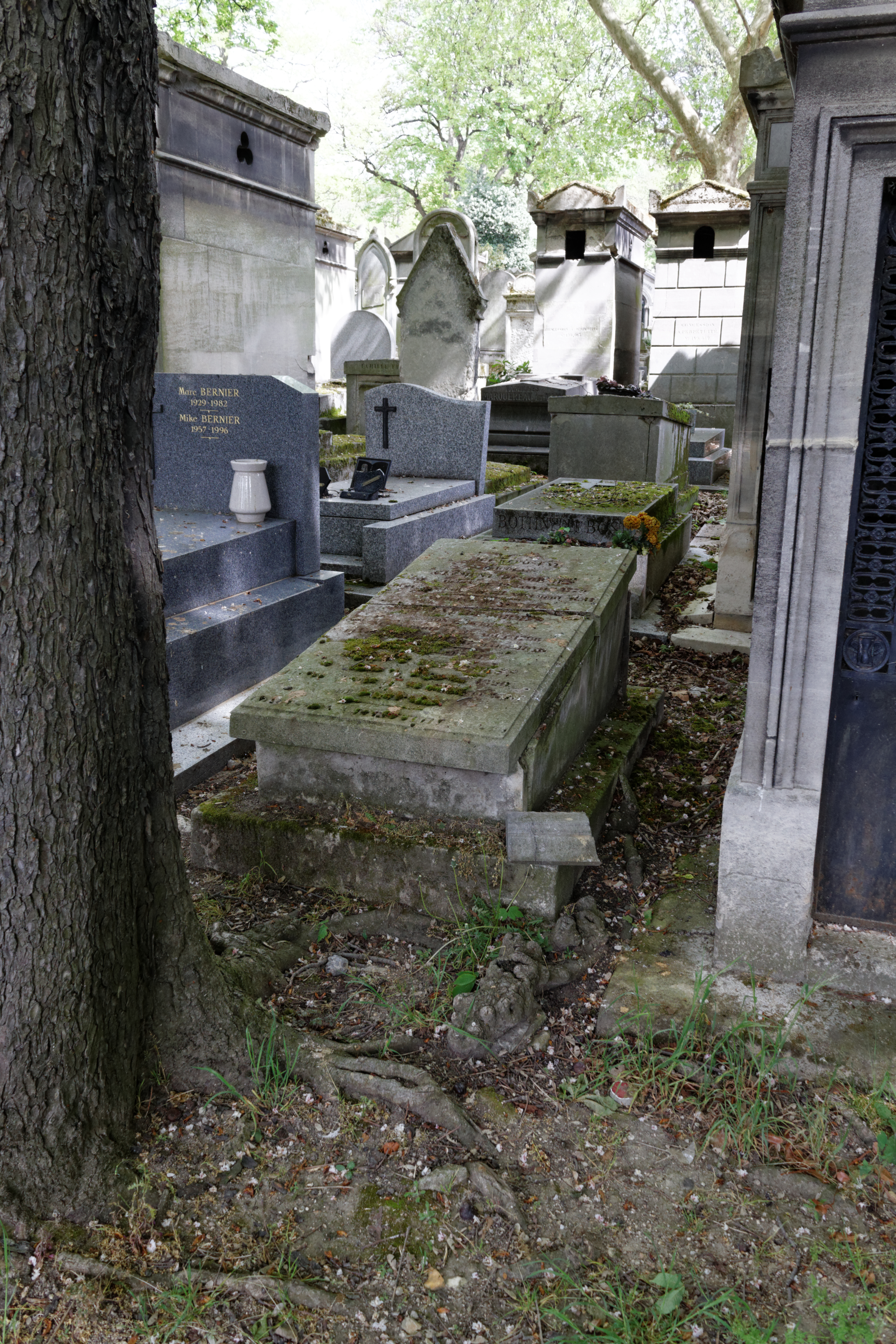
- Grave at Père Lachaise Cemetery
- Born: 12 January 1779; Dijon, France
- Died: 21 November 1841 (aged 62); Paris, France
- Occupation(s): Chemist; Physicist

Nicolas Clément (12 January 1779 – 21 November 1841) was a French physicist and chemist.

He was a colleague of Charles Desormes, with whom he conducted the Clément-Desormes experiment. The two chemists are also credited with determining an accurate value of gamma in the gas law (see Equation of state) that relates the heat capacity of air when expanded at constant pressure vs. constant temperature. They also conducted research on iodine and played a role in determining that it was an element. This research eventually led others to invent the process of photography, and Clément-Desormes is recognized as a contributor in the early history of that industry. Among their accomplishments was establishing a value for absolute zero.

== Marriage ==
Clément married the daughter of Desormers and adopted the family surname Clément-Desormes.

== Career ==
Professor Clément held one of the first chairs in chemistry at the Conservatoire des Arts et Metiers in Paris. He taught a course in industrial chemistry that emphasized the thermodynamics of steam in relation to powering steam engines. In about 1819, he befriended Sadi Carnot, and the two men developed methods for calculating the maximum amount of energy that could be obtained from a kg of coal. Clément and Carnot clearly understood the concept of a Mechanical equivalent of heat, and developed formulae for calculating energy efficiency almost 20 years before Mayer and Joule's work on this subject in the 1840s. Evidence concerning the connection between Clément and Carnot is summarized in a book by the historian, Robert Fox. and in an article on the history of the calorie.

Clément was the first man known to define and utilize the Calorie as a unit of heat. The definition was published in the journal, Le Producteur, in 1824. His calorie was a kg-calorie (modern kcal), and his definition entered French dictionaries as early as 1842. One of his lasting influences was to help the calorie enter the international lexicon. It was defined as heating a kilogram of water by 1 degree Celsius until about 1929, but was superseded when a committee of the British Academy of Sciences proposed the g-calorie as an alternate unit of energy (with the newly defined joule taking precedence). This marked the beginning of "calorie confusion" because the kilocalorie had to be introduced as a unit in the m-kg-s system. Thus, the reason that U.S. food labels describe food energy in calories can be traced to Nicolas Clément-Desormes's lectures of 1819–1824.

Clément-Desormes was a successful young industrialist who owned and partnered with several chemical companies, including one that made sugar from beets. He was sought after as an industrial consultant. Some speculate that his sudden death was brought on by a business disagreement concerning payments that were owed to him for successful introduction of a profitable process.

== See also ==
- Gas laws
- Iodine
- Calorie
- Category:Thermodynamics
