= Adolphe Carnot =

French chemist, mining engineer and politician (1839–1920)

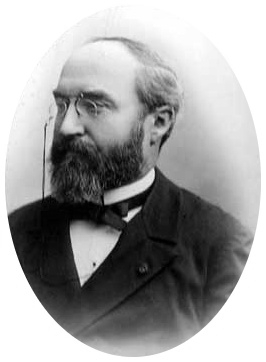
Marie-Adolphe Carnot.

Marie Adolphe Carnot (English: /kɑːrˈnoʊ/ kar-NOH, French: [maʁi adɔlf kaʁno]; 27 January 1839 – 20 June 1920) was a French chemist, mining engineer and politician. He came from a distinguished family: his father, Hippolyte Carnot, and brother, Marie François Sadi Carnot, were politicians, the latter becoming President of the third French Republic. His uncle, military engineer Nicolas Léonard Sadi Carnot, is considered the father of modern thermodynamics.

He was born in Paris and studied at the École Polytechnique and the École des Mines. He became a member of the Corps des mines, and from 1864 to 1867, served as a mining engineer in Limoges. From 1868 to 1877 he was a professor of preparatory courses and general chemistry at the École des Mines in Paris, where from 1877 to 1901, he worked as a professor of analytical chemistry.

In 1881 he was appointed Chief Engineer of Mines, and in 1894, was named Inspector General of Mines. He became director of the École des Mines in 1901, a post he held until 1907. Aside from administrative work and teaching and training many engineers, he wrote a treatise on the chemical analysis of minerals (Traité d'analyse des substances minérales, published 1898) and pursued research. The uranium ore carnotite is named after him.

He was honoured with membership of the Académie d'Agriculture (1884) and Académie des sciences (1895), and was made a Commander of the Légion d'honneur (1903). He also pursued a political career.
