= Conférence Molé-Tocqueville =

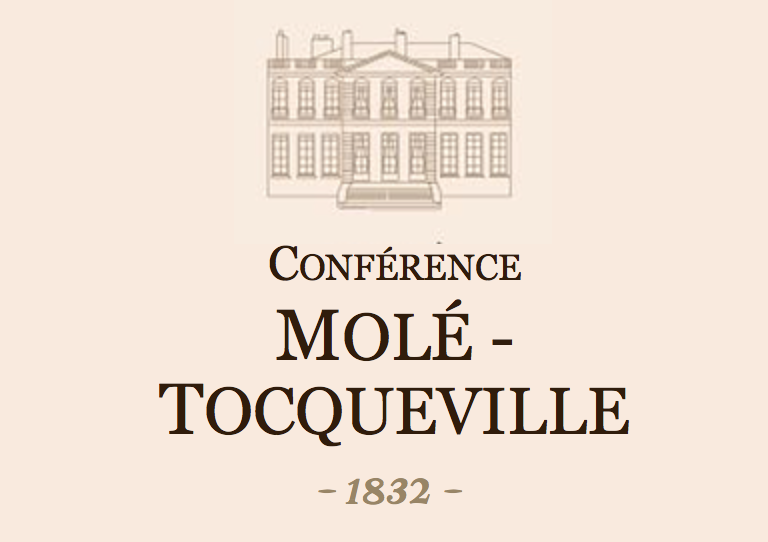
- Named after: Louis-Mathieu Molé
- Formation: 19 March 1832; 194 years ago
- Founder: Count of Montalivet
- Founded at: Paris, France
- Type: Debating society
- Legal status: Active
- Headquarters: Paris
- Members: 221 (1846)
- Official language: French
- Main organ: Bulletin hebdomadaire de la Conférence Molé-Tocqueville

The Conférence Molé was a French debating society founded in 1832. In 1876, it became the Conférence Molé-Tocqueville. Its purpose was to debate legislation, administration, political economy and general politics. The debates were modelled on parliamentary procedures and served to train future politicians. The society also provided a venue where young men of the élite could meet and become known to established political figures. The society became dormant in the 1970s but was revived in the 1990s.

== Foundation ==
The Conférence Molé was founded during the July Monarchy on 19 March 1832. It was founded by the Count of Montalivet and sponsored by king Louis Philippe. The choice of name has not been explained, but seems to be a reference to the politician Louis-Mathieu Molé (1781–1855). One of the co-founders was M. Pontmartin, possibly Armand Pontmartin. Another was Huard-Delamarre, an advocate. There were three magistrates: Adrien Gastambide, Gustave Aignan and Édouard Ternaux, nephew of the cashmere manufacturer William-Louis Ternaux. Four founders were members of the council of state: Mortimer Ternaux, Achille Guilhem, Prosper Hochet and Édouard Bocher. Charles His and the Count of Cambis were embassy secretaries, and Grille de Beuzelin was a functionary in a ministry. Other founders were Edmond Anthoine, Édouard Goupil, Francisque Lefèvre and Alp. d'Herbelot.

== Structure ==
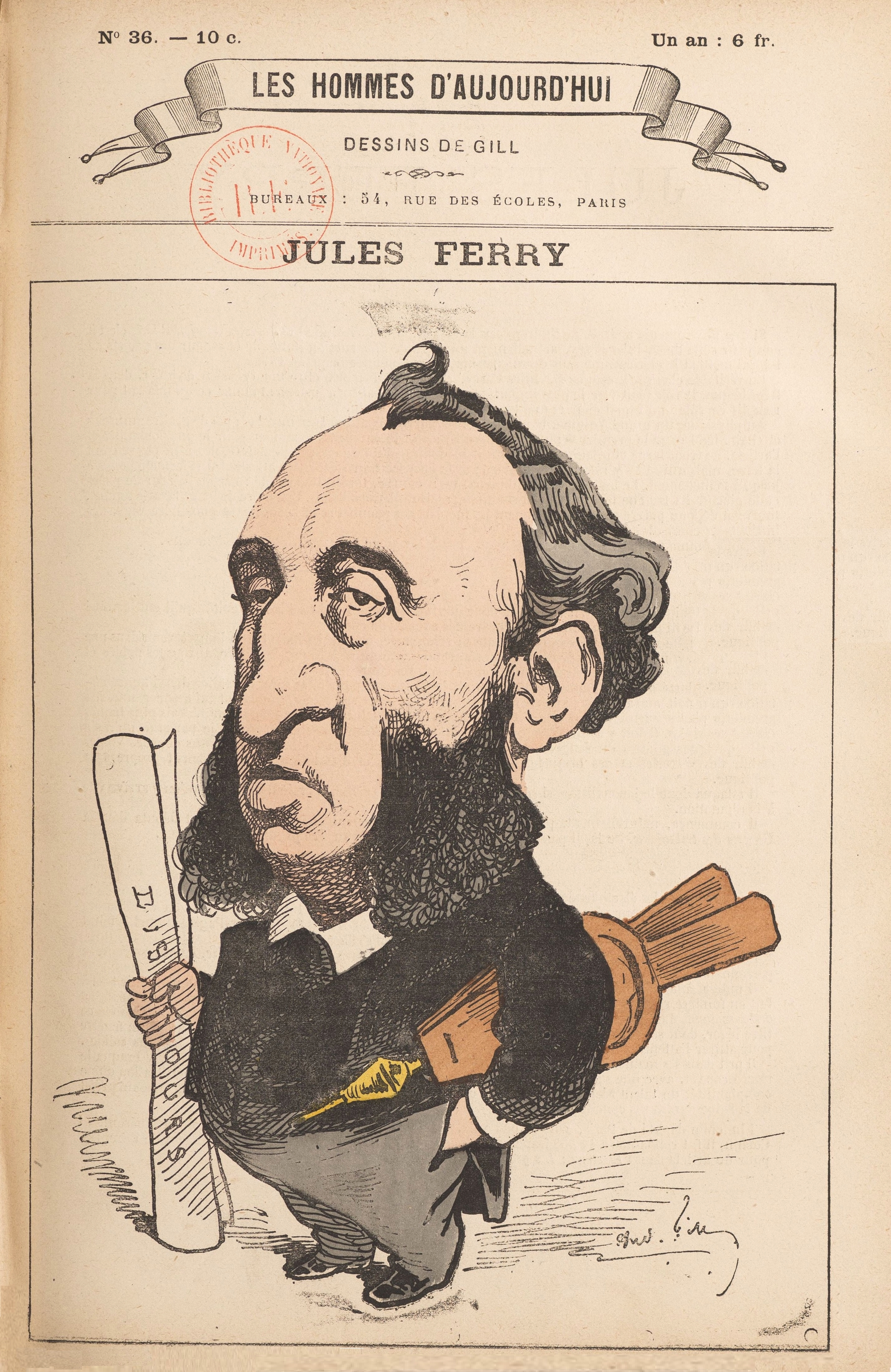
Jules Ferry

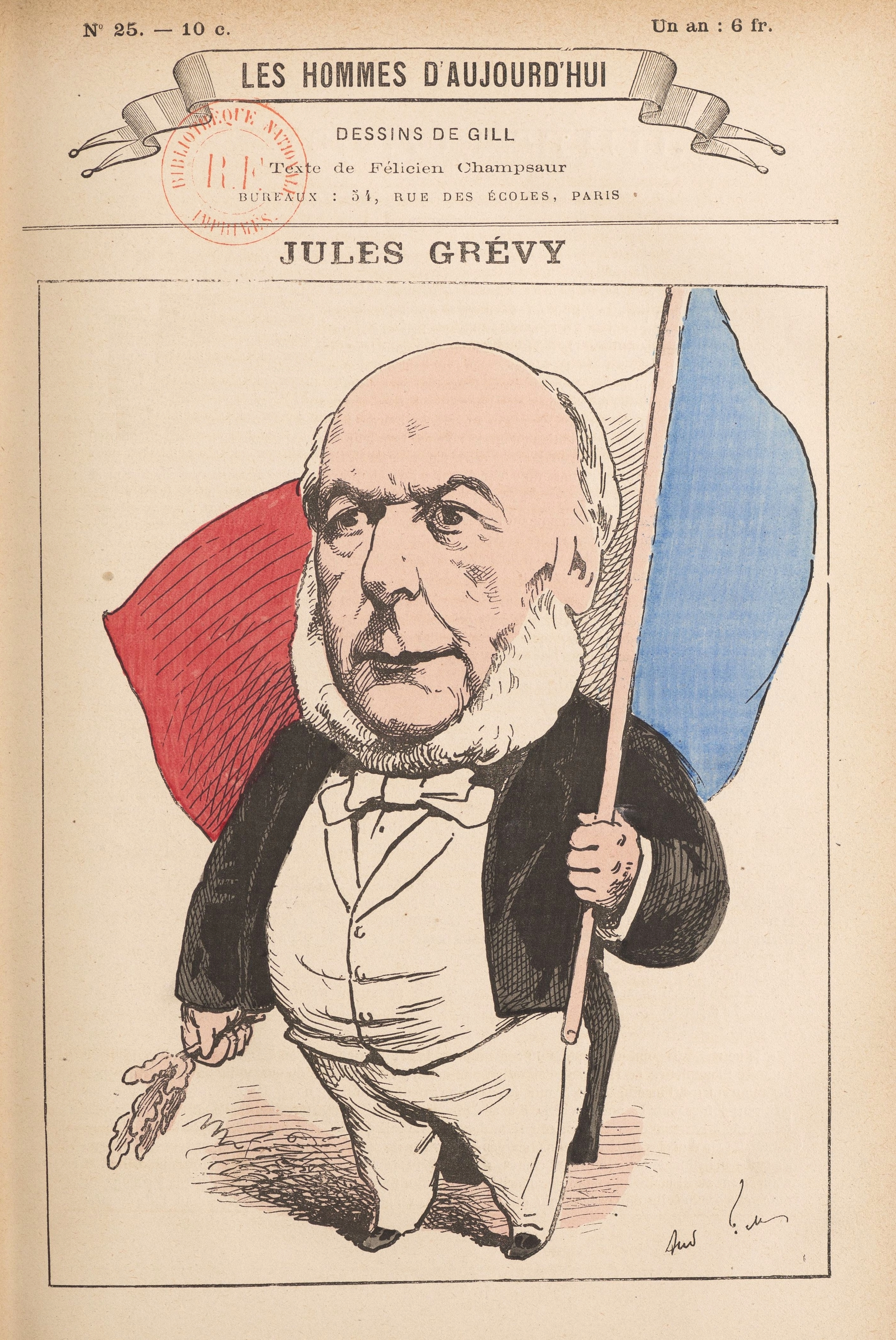
Jules Grévy

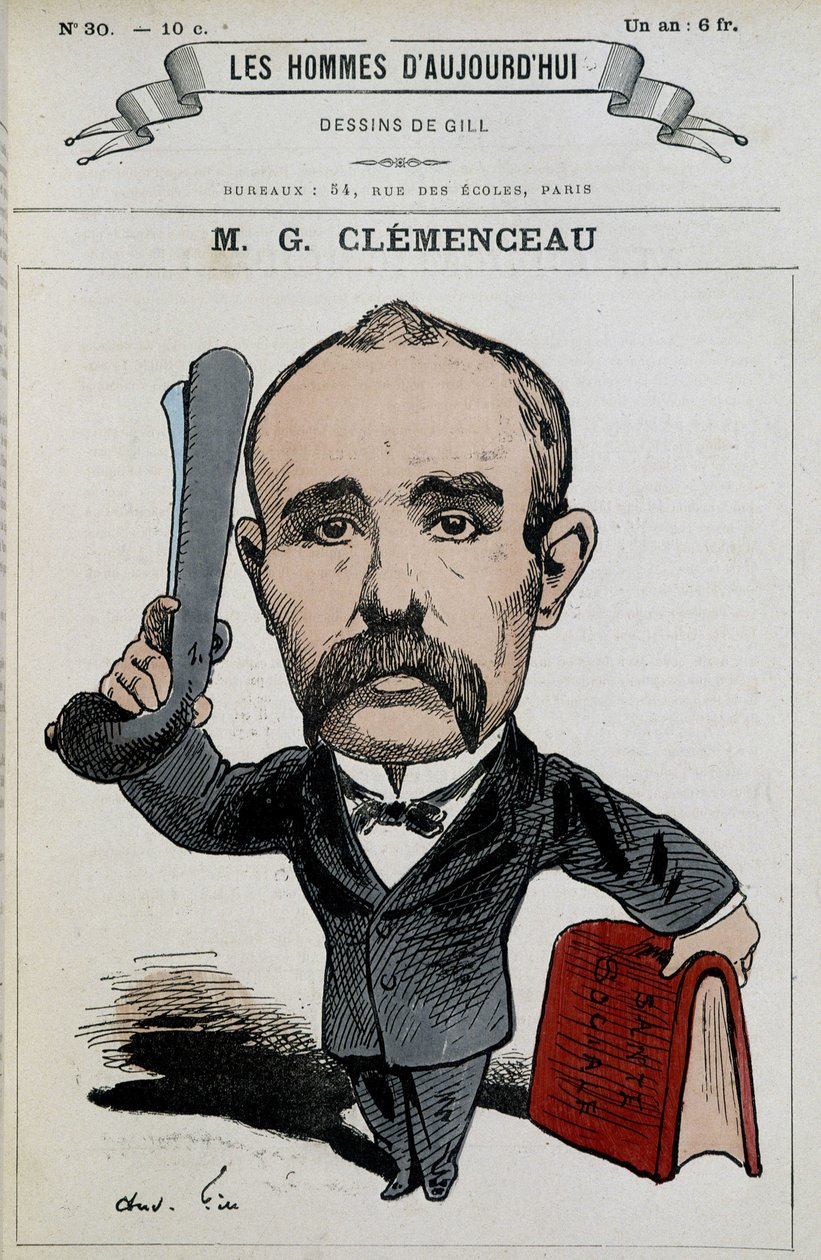
Georges Clemenceau

Noted members

The headquarters of the Conférence Molé were at 8, rue de Poitiers, in the Academy of Medicine. At first the membership was limited to 80, divided into four committees. Later this was changed to 150, without mention of committees. A list of members seeking admission was prepared each year. Each candidate had to be sponsored by three members, with a declaration prepared by one of the sponsors. Admission was accepted at the meeting of the members. The entrance fee was 10 francs, with a contribution of 24 francs for each session, or 48 francs for the year. After ten years of attendance members became honorary members. The Molé was a place where young men of the élite could mix with notable older men. The board of directors was a permanent body, unlike the presidency which lasted only to six months and was meant to alternate between left and right wing presidents.

The society trained young people in debates and in the workings of a legislative chamber. Its purpose was to study and consider legislation, administration, political economy and general politics. Members met weekly for six months of the year. The proceedings were modelled on those of the Chamber of Deputies or Corps législatif. A mock bill was tabled by a member, examined in committee and then presented to the general assembly. After discussion, the members voted on the bill. Topics included prostitution, decentralization and freedom of association.

It was customary for a member to make their maiden speech on the first occasion after being admitted. The members formed factions based on political affinities, like the political groups in parliament. The meeting room contained "desks as in the Chamber, a committee, a gallery. Franck Chauveau, president of the society in 1876, said "We naturally acquire a taste here for free institutions, a spirit of discussion and free scrutiny, the habits of parliamentary life of which the Conférence is the image.

== History ==
The Conférence Molé was an important training group for future political leaders in the July Monarchy. Around 1845 the Molé absorbed a similar, well-known society, the Conférence d'Orsay. The Conférence d'Orsay had been founded in 1839 by some young, conservative aristocrats and law students who met at the Quai d'Orsay. It was joined by Louis Ferdinand Alfred Maury in 1841 after he left the Conférence Bailly. The Molé played a key role during the French Second Republic. In 1850 the Conférence Molé moved to 40, rue des Saints-Pères, following the Academy of Medicine. It remained there until 7 July 1939.

The Molé tended to be moderately conservative under the July Monarchy, and was critical of the authoritarian regime of the Second French Empire. It was one of the rare places where some degree of free public discussion was allowed under the Empire. Léon Gambetta was admitted to the Molé in 1861 and wrote to his father, "It is no mere lawyers club, but a veritable political assembly with a left, a right, a center; legislative proposals are the sole subject of discussion. It is there that are formed all the political men of France; it is a veritable training ground for the tribune." Gambetta, like many other French orators, learned the art of public speaking at the Molé. At that time the Molé met in the Café Procope in the Rue de l'Ancienne-Comédie, the oldest coffee house in Paris. Other active members during this period included Ernest Picard, Clément Laurier and Léon Renault.

Debating societies flourished in the second half of the 19th century in the absence of political parties. Of these, the Conférence Molé, known simply as "Le Molé", was the most influential and the most politicized. Under the French Third Republic many members of the Molé became parliamentary leaders, so membership was sought after by aspiring politicians. On 28 April 1876 the Conférence Molé merged with the Conférence Tocqueville, which had been founded in 1863. (Note: The Tocqueville was founded by Charles Savary, a future minister of the Third Republic, for young men who found it too difficult to join the Molé. In 1870 it absorbed the less political Conférence La Bruyère, and in 1871 absorbed the Conférence Montesquieu.) The Conférence Molé-Tocqueville continued to prosper. By 1886 it had 344 members and 376 former members. The society was less active in the 1880s, but experienced a revival in the 1890s when it was stimulated by competition and the introduction of new debating techniques. On 30 April 1897 Félix Faure, President of France, decreed that the Conférence Molé-Tocqueville was an "establishment of public utility".

Of the 320 cabinet members from 1871 to 1914, 26 had belonged to the Molé, 6 to the Tocqueville, 10 to the Molé-Tocqueville and 2 to the Bruyère. 43 ministers, or 13.4%, had belonged to one of these societies. Of Paris municipal councilors between 1871 and 1914, 12 had been members of the Molé, 4 of the Tocqueville and 40 of the Molé-Tocqueville. Édouard Hervé had belonged to both the Molé and the Tocqueville before their merger. A total of 44 people had thus belonged to one of the societies, or 9.7% of the councilors. These men often played a leading role in the municipal council: 20 were presidents, vice-presidents or secretaries of the council.

In the period between World War I and World War II, 105 deputies belonged to the Conférence Molé-Tocqueville before being elected. After World War II the Conférence Molé-Tocqueville resumed its sessions, and had lively debates during the Algerian War. It became moribund in the 1970s. A 1989 paper dated the last traces of its existence to 1978. The conference was revived in the 1990s to discuss involvement of civil society in the French economic and social fabric.

== Noted members ==
Early members included Louis Wolowski and Édouard Allou, who became president. Several non-removable Senators belonged to the conferences. Lawyers included René Bérenger, Louis Buffet, Marc Antoine Calmon, Jules Cazot, Jean Clamageran (president in 1858), Henry Didier, Albert Grévy, Édouard René de Laboulaye and Ernest Picard (president in 1853). Other noted members included Philippe Paul de Ségur (1780–1873), James Mayer de Rothschild (1792–1868), Napoleon III (1808–73), Jules Ferry (1832–93), Georges Clemenceau (1841–1929), Pierre de Coubertin (1863–1937), André Citroën (1878–1935), Pierre Taittinger (1887–1965) and Guy Mollet (1905–75).

In 1846 there were 221 members. 44 had left the society, so a total of 265 had been or were part of it. Of 230 who gave their professions, 138 were advocates or magistrates, 30 in the Council of State, 16 in public office and 11 diplomats. Of the 265 members up to 1846, 59 became deputies. 30 served under one regime, 18 under two regimes and 9 under 3 regimes. Werner de Merode and Charles-Pierre-Paul Paulmier were deputies under four regimes: the July Monarchy, French Second Republic, Second French Empire and French Third Republic. Eight became ministers: Louis Buffet, Charles de Morny, Lionel de Moustier, Auguste de Talhouët-Royt and Adolphe Vuitry under the Second Empire, Louis Decazes, Eugène de Goulard and Pierre Edmond Teisserenc de Bort under the Third Republic. Jules Grévy was elected president of the Republic in 1879.

== Sources ==
- An "Attaché" (1885), "Reminiscences of an "Attaché"", Blackwood's Edinburgh Magazine, William Blackwood
- Béguec, Gilles Le; Manigand, Christine (2004), Henry, Robert et Bertrand de Jouvenel: crise et métamorphoses de l'état démocratique, (1900-1935) (in French), Presses Univ. Limoges, ISBN 978-2-84287-304-2
- Fraser's Magazine (1881), "Léon Michael Gambetta", The Eclectic Magazine of Foreign Literature, Science, and Art, Leavitt, Trow, & Company
- Gerson, Stéphane (2003), The Pride of Place: Local Memories & Political Culture in Nineteenth-century France, Cornell University Press, ISBN 0-8014-8873-7
- Histoire: La Conférence (in French), Conférence Molé-Tocqueville, archived from the original on 2017-10-15
- Manigand, Christine (2000), Henry de Jouvenel (in French), Presses Univ. Limoges, ISBN 978-2-84287-191-8
- Martin-Frugier, Anne (April–June 1989), "La formation des élites: les "conférences" sous la Restauration et la Monarchie de Juillet", Revue d'histoire moderne et contemporaine, 36 (2), Societe d'Histoire Moderne et Contemporaine, JSTOR 20529584
- Mayeur, Jean Marie; Corbin, Alain; Schweitz, Arlette (1995), Les immortels du Sénat, 1875-1918: les cent seize inamovibles de la Troisième République (in French), Publications de la Sorbonne, ISBN 978-2-85944-273-6
- Nagai, Nobuhito (2002), Les conseillers municipaux de Paris sous la troisième république, 1871-1914 (in French), Publications de la Sorbonne, ISBN 978-2-85944-440-2
- Nord, Philip G. (1995), The Republican Moment: Struggles for Democracy in Nineteenth-century France, Harvard University Press, ISBN 978-0-674-76271-8
