= Procopio Cutò =

Chef from Sicily (1651–1727)

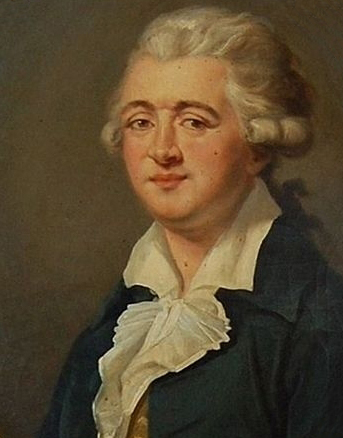
- Born: 9 February 1651; Palermo or Aci Trezza, Kingdom of Sicily
- Died: 10 February 1727 (aged 76); Paris, France
- Other names: Francesco Procopio Cutò, Francesco Procopio dei Coltelli, or François Procope
- Occupations: Chef; entrepreneur
- Known for: Pioneer in the Italian gelato business Opened the first literary coffeehouse, Café Procope

Procopio Cutò, also known as Francesco Procopio Cutò, Francesco Procopio dei Coltelli, or François Procope (9 February 1651 – 10 February 1727) was an Italian chef, a subject of the Kingdom of Sicily. He founded in 1686 what has become the oldest extant café in Paris, Café Procope. It became the first literary coffeehouse in Paris. For over 200 years the cafe-restaurant attracted notables in the world of arts, politics, and literature.

== Biography ==
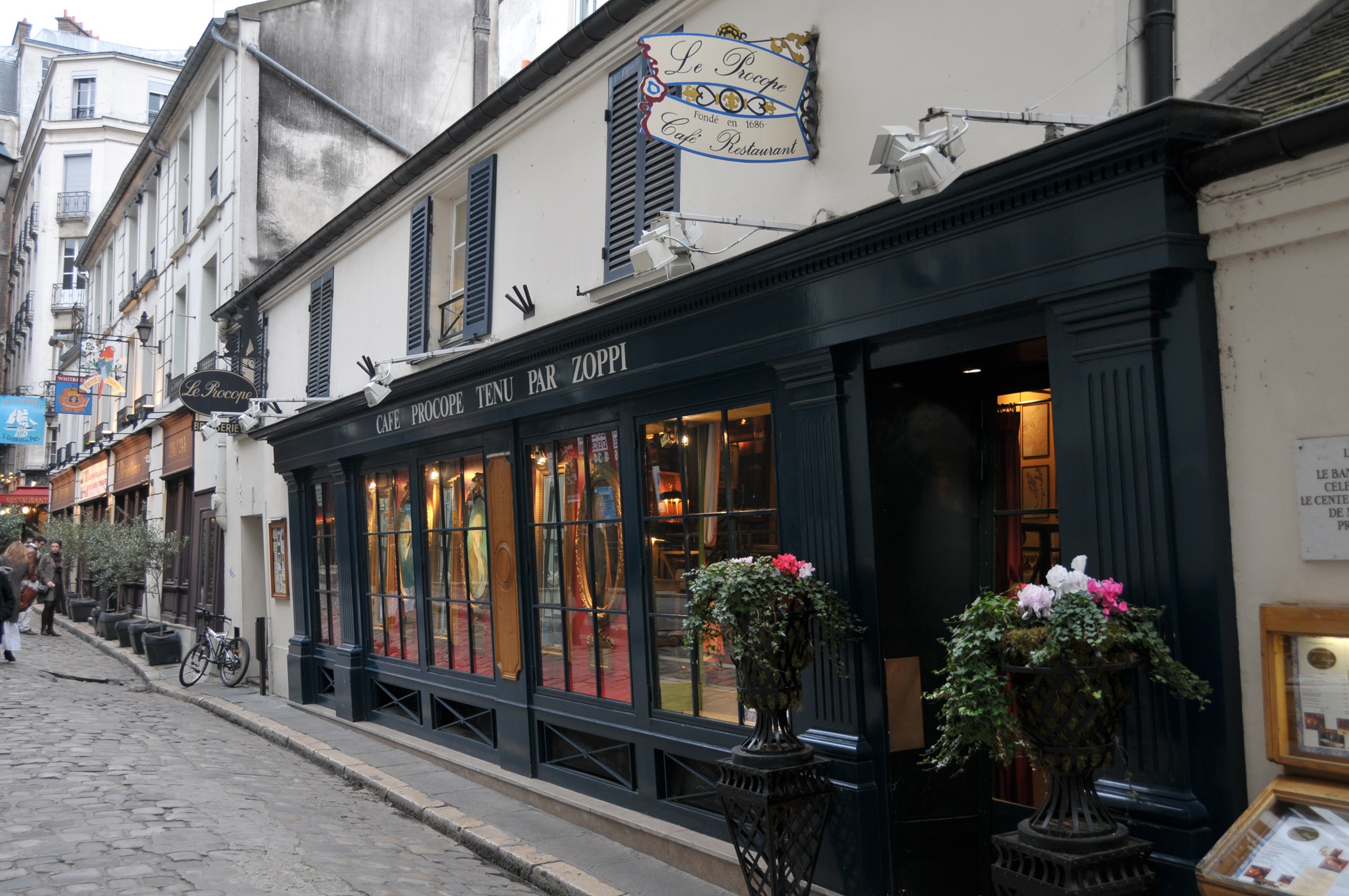
Cutò founded Café Procope in Paris in 1686.

Some sources say Cutò was born near Mount Etna in Sicily around the town of Aci Trezza. Other sources say he was born at or near Palermo. A certificate of baptism of 10 February 1651 has been found in the archives of the parish church of one day after his birth that shows his first name as Francesco and his surname as Cutò, a common surname in Sicily. A third possibility is that he was born near Palermo and lived in Aci Trezza for a period of time.

The name Procopio was adopted from the historian Procopius, whose Secret History, the Anekdota, long known of, had been discovered in the Vatican Library and published for the first time ever in 1623: it told the scandals of the Byzantine emperor Justinian I, the empress-consort Theodora, and his court.

Cutò received the surname dei Coltelli from the French, who mistook his Sicilian family name, as it is a homophone of French couteaux "knives". Coltelli means "knives" in Italian. Hence, translating back into Italian gives Francesco Procopio dei Coltelli, the other name he is known by. "Francesco Procopio" are his forenames; Francesco was his grandfather's name.

Cutò married Marguerite Crouïn on 26 February 1675 in the Church of Saint-Sulpice, Paris. The marriage record shows the witnesses as his father Onofrio Cutò and his mother Domenica Semarqua. Procopio and Marguerite had eight children during their long marriage before Procopio became a widower in 1696.

=== Early life ===
Cutò played in the snow when he was a boy. The snow was mixed with fruit juices and honey to make a type of sorbet. This type of "ice cream" was eaten by both rich aristocrats and by peasants. This is where Procopio got the idea of developing gelato. Procopio is credited with being the inventor of modern gelato.

Cutò worked first as a fisherman like his father Onofrio. His grandfather Francesco was also a fisherman from Aci Trezza who built gelatiere machines (ice cream makers) part-time, when he was not fishing. Francesco eventually left his invention to his grandson as an inheritance. Cutò tinkered with his grandfather's "ice cream" machine making various improvements and eventually felt that he had developed a machine that would produce gelato on a large scale and decided to promote the new product. He left Sicily and went to France by way of Italy.

=== Café Procope ===
Cutò acquired the skills to become a cook, possibly in Palermo on his way to France, arriving in Paris sometime between 1670 and 1674. There he joined the guild of the distillateurs-limonadiers (English: distiller - soft drinks manufacturers) and apprenticed under the leadership of an Armenian immigrant named Pascal who had a kiosk (la loge de la limonade, English: lemonade stand) on rue de Tournon selling refreshments, including lemonade and coffee. Pascal's attempt at such a business in Paris was not successful and he went to London in 1675, leaving the stall to Cutò.

Cutò had learned in about 1680 how to make a beverage of ice made of lemonade using salt to lower its temperature and keep cooler longer. He had a special royal license from King Louis XIV to sell a melange of refreshments including spices, iced drinks including "frozen waters", barley water, anise flower, orange flower, cinnamon flower, frangipan, and his improved version of the Italian "ice cream" of fruit-based gelatos like lemon and orange. This gave him exclusive rights to these unique sweet and cool products from his kiosk booth at the Foire Saint-Germain.

Prior to Cutò arriving in France there had been other cafés (coffee houses) there, although they were called boutiques at the time. Some were referred to as lemonade stands, meaning they sold various cold drinks including lemonade. There had been a café in Marseille in 1644 before Pascal and Cutò that soon became defunct, and a Levantine had opened a coffee house in Paris in 1643, which had also failed. It seems, however, that Pascal was the first to call his establishment a "café" or coffee house where one drinks coffee. Establishments serving coffee were in fact common in Paris at this time, although almost all of them were frequented by foreigners and the lower classes. By selling coffee at the fair, Pascal made coffee-drinking acceptable to the general public.

Cutò soon added coffee to his refreshments' list and the kiosk became a café. He introduced the Italian "ice cream" gelato at his café and is one of the first to sell this new European product directly to the public. Prior to then it was reserved for royalty only. Cutò's café served it in small porcelain bowls that resembled egg cups. He is sometimes referred to as "The Father of Italian gelato".

Cutò relocated his kiosk in 1686 to the rue des Fossés Saint-German. In 1689, as luck would have it, the Comédie-Française opened its doors across the street from his café, and it became a very popular cultural and political gathering place. Notable people who have frequented the café include Maximilien Robespierre, Victor Hugo, Paul Verlaine, Pierre Beaumarchais, Jean-Jacques Rousseau, Alain-René Lesage, Georges Danton, Jean-Paul Marat, Honoré de Balzac and Denis Diderot. Even Benjamin Franklin, Thomas Jefferson, John Paul Jones, Oscar Wilde, Henry Wadsworth Longfellow, Napoleon Bonaparte and Voltaire visited Procopio's cafe not only for coffee and intellectual conversations, but for gelato. In 1702, he changed his name to François Procope.

His café in the 17th century turned France into a coffee drinking society. It is considered the most famous and successful cafe in Paris. To fans of French history Procopio's business is considered "the holy grail of Parisian cafés".

=== Later life ===
Cutò obtained French citizenship in 1685. He married a second time in 1696 and fathered five more children with Anne Françoise Garnier. He was married a third time at the age of 66, in 1717, to Julie Parmentier and had another son. In 1702, he changed his name to François Procope. One of his children became a witty doctor, Dr. Michel Procope-Couteau (1684-1753), who wrote "L'art de faire des Garcons" and practiced in Paris. Dr. Procope shows up as a fictionalized character in Patrick Suskind's novel, Perfume

His second son Alexandre took over the Café Procope in 1716, but Cutò continued to operate another café during the annual Foire Saint-Germain.

== Bibliography ==
- Albala, Ken (2003). Food in Early Modern Europe. Westport: Greenwood Publishing Group. ISBN 0-313-31962-6.
- David, Elizabeth (20 January 2011). Harvest of the Cold Months: The Social History of Ice and Ices. Faber & Faber. ISBN 9780571275328.
- Dejean, Joan (2006). The Essence of Style: How the French Invented High Fashion, Fine Food, Chic Cafes, Style, Sophistication, and Glamour. New York: Free Press. ISBN 0-7432-6414-2.
- Fitch, Noël Riley (2007). Grand Literary Cafes of Europe. New York: New Holland Publishers (UK) LTD. ISBN 978-1-84537-114-2.
- Moramarco, Federico (2000). Italian Pride: 101 Reasons to Be Proud You're Italian. City: Citadel Trade. ISBN 1-55972-512-5.
- Portinari, Folco (1987). Voglia di Gelato. Milano: Idea Libri. ISBN 88-7082-113-7.
- Thomazeau, François; Ageorges, Sylvain (2007). "Le Procope". The Brasseries of Paris. New York: New York Review of Books. ISBN 978-1-892145-49-9.
- Weinberg, Bennett Alan; Bealer, Bonnie K. (2001). "Europe wakes up to caffeine". The World of Caffeine: the science and culture of the world's most popular drug. New York: Routledge. p. 72. ISBN 0-415-92722-6.
- Le Sage, Alain Rene (1886). The Adventures of Gil Blas of Santillana. Harvard University: William Paterson.
