= Nicolas Léonard Sadi Carnot =

French physicist and engineer (1796–1832)

Sadi Carnot
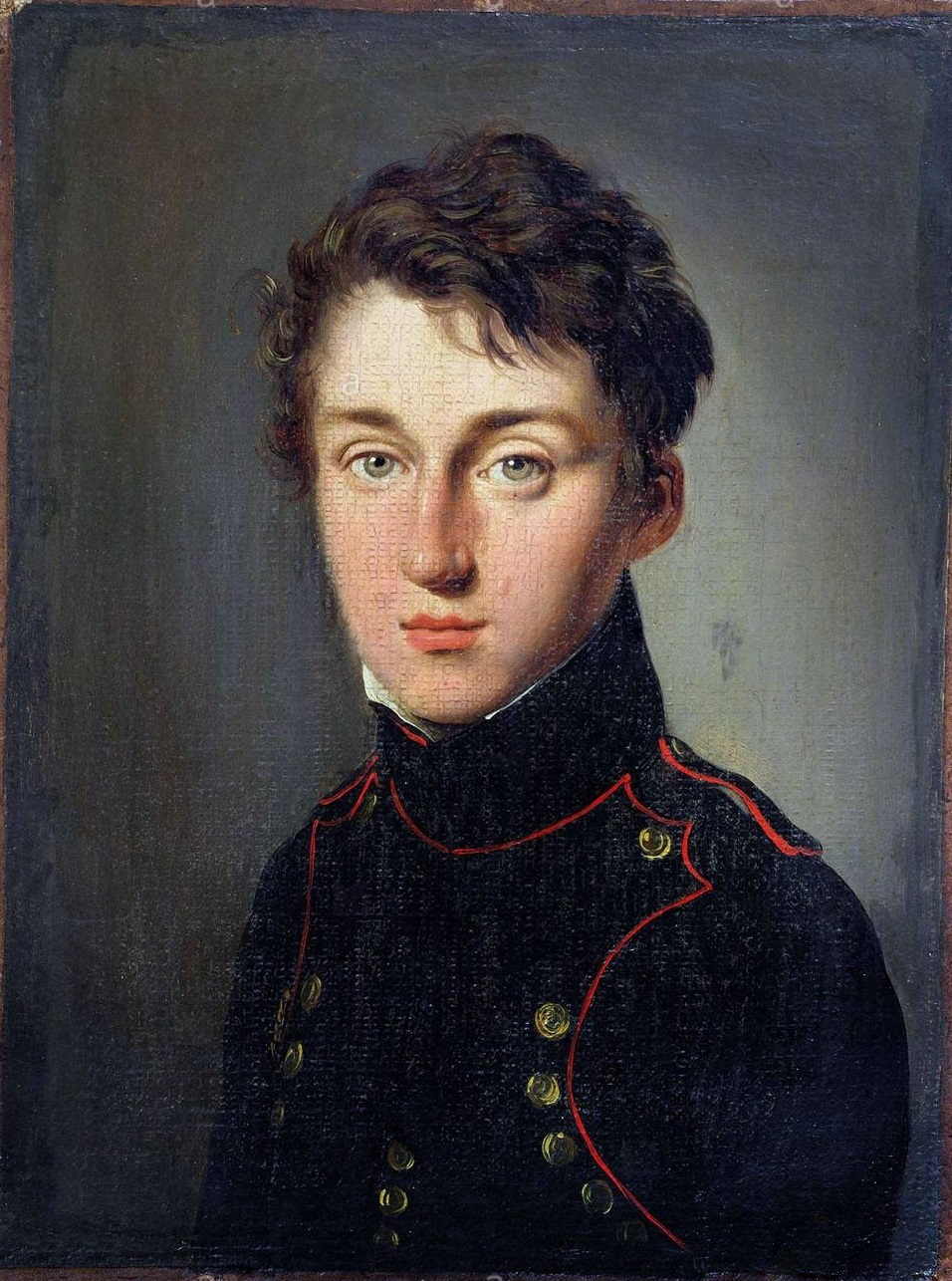
- Carnot aged 17 in the uniform of a cadet of the École polytechnique. Portrait by Louis-Léopold Boilly (1813).
- Born: 1 June 1796; Petit Luxembourg, Paris, France
- Died: 24 August 1832 (aged 36); Ivry-sur-Seine, France
- Resting place: Old cemetery of Ivry-sur-Seine
- Education: École polytechnique École d'application de l'artillerie et du génie Conservatoire national des arts et métiers
- Known for: Carnot cycle, Carnot heat engine, Thermal efficiency, Carnot theorem, Second law of thermodynamics, Clausius–Clapeyron relation
- Father: Lazare Carnot
- Scientific career
- Fields: Physics, military engineering
- Workplaces: French Army

Signature
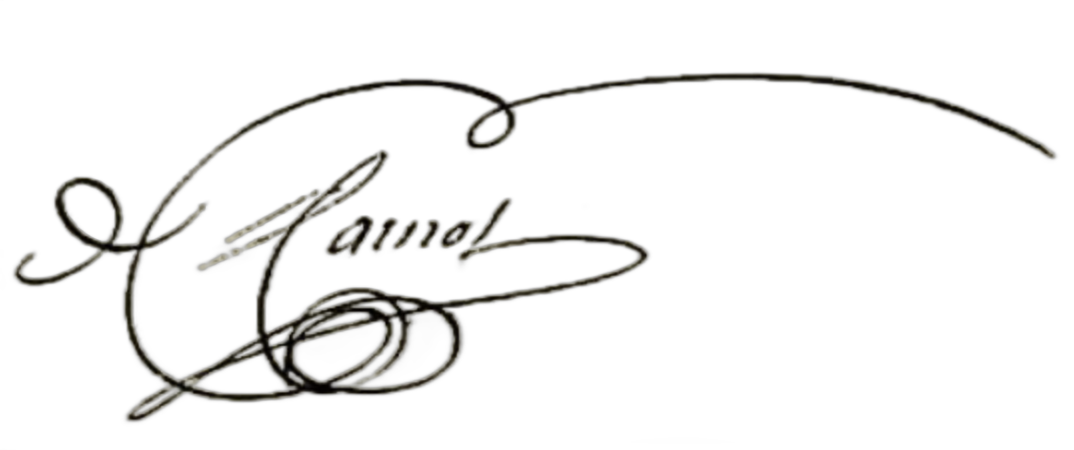

Nicolas Léonard Sadi Carnot (English: /kɑːrˈnoʊ/ kar-NOH, French: [nikɔla leɔnaʁ sadi kaʁno]; 1 June 1796 – 24 August 1832), known as Sadi Carnot, was a French military engineer and physicist. A graduate of the École polytechnique, Carnot served as an officer in the Engineering Arm (le génie) of the French Army. He also pursued scientific studies, and in June 1824 published an essay titled Reflections on the Motive Power of Fire. In that book, which would be his only publication, Carnot developed the first successful theory of the maximum efficiency of heat engines.

Carnot's scientific work attracted little attention during his lifetime, but in 1834 it became the object of a detailed commentary and explanation by another French engineer, Émile Clapeyron. Clapeyron's commentary in turn attracted the attention of William Thomson (later Lord Kelvin) and Rudolf Clausius. Thomson used Carnot's analysis to develop an absolute thermodynamic temperature scale, while Clausius used it to define the concept of entropy, thus formalizing the second law of thermodynamics.

Carnot was the son of Lazare Carnot, an eminent mathematician, engineer, and commander of the French Revolutionary Army and later of the Napoleonic army. Some of the difficulties that Carnot faced in his own career might have been connected to the persecution of his family by the restored Bourbon monarchy after the fall of Napoleon in 1815. Carnot died in relative obscurity at the age of 36, but today he is often characterized as the "father of thermodynamics".

== Biography ==
=== Family background ===
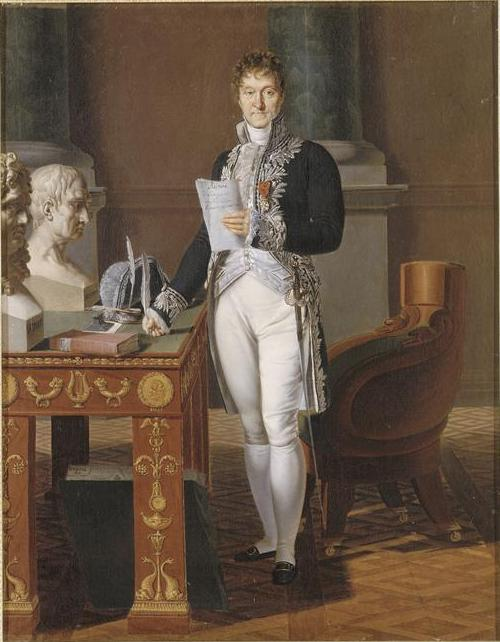
Portrait of Sadi Carnot's father, Lazare Carnot (1753–1823) as a Napoleonic general, by an unknown artist, ca. 1815, Museum of French History, Versailles

Sadi Carnot was born in Paris on 1 June 1796, at the Petit Luxembourg palace, where his father Lazare resided as one of the five members of the Directory, the highest governing body of the French First Republic in the immediate aftermath of the Thermidorian Reaction. His mother, Sophie née Dupont (1764-1813), came from a wealthy family based in Saint-Omer. His father named him after the 13th-century Persian poet Sadi of Shiraz. An elder brother, also named Sadi, had been born in 1794 but died in infancy the following year. "Sadi" is the only given name that appears in the second-born's civil birth certificate, dated 14 prairial, year IV in the French Republican calendar.

On 11 July 1796, the child was baptized in the Catholic church of Saint-Louis-d'Antin as "Nicolas-Léonard Dupont". The principal witness at that baptism was his maternal grandfather, Jacques-Antoine-Léonard Dupont. The father is wrongly identified in the baptismal record as Jacques-Léonard-Joseph-Auguste Dupont (who was, in fact, the child's maternal uncle). Following the biographical notice published long after his death by his brother Hippolyte, most sources now give his full name as "Nicolas Léonard Sadi", but there is no evidence that he ever used any name other than Sadi.

Sadi had a younger brother, Hippolyte Carnot, who was born in 1801 in Saint-Omer and who would later become a prominent politician. Hippolyte's eldest son, also named Sadi Carnot, would go on to serve as President of France from 1887 to 1894. Another of Hippolyte's sons was the chemist, mining engineer and politician Adolphe Carnot. Sadi himself would remain a bachelor and left no descendants.

=== Education and military career ===
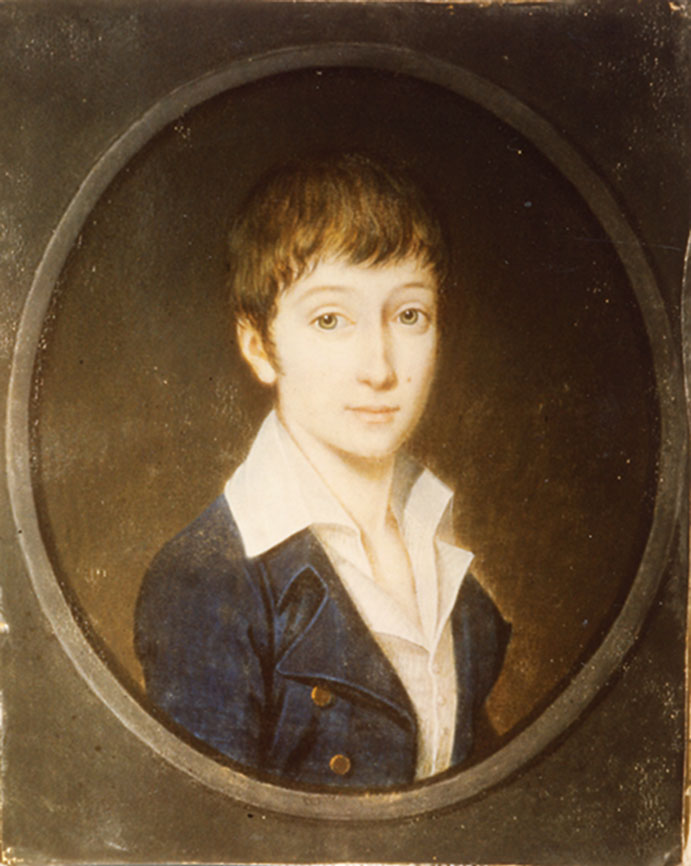
Portrait of Sadi Carnot, aged 10, by Félie Carnot, 1806. Académie François Bourdon, Le Creusot, France

The young Sadi Carnot was educated first at home by his father and later at the Lycée Charlemagne, in Paris, where he prepared for the examinations required to enter the École polytechnique, which his father had helped to establish. In 1811, at the age of 16 (the minimum allowed), he became a cadet of the École polytechnique, where his classmates included the future mathematician Michel Chasles. Among his professors were André-Marie Ampère, Siméon Denis Poisson, François Arago, and Gaspard-Gustave Coriolis. Thus, the school had become renowned for its instruction in mathematics and physics.

During the Battle of Paris in March of 1814, Carnot, Chasles, and other cadets of the École polytechnique participated in the defense of Vincennes. This appears to have been Carnot's only experience of battle. Carnot graduated in 1814 and was admitted at the École d'application de l'artillerie et du génie ("School of Applied Artillery and Military Engineering") in Metz, where he completed a two-year course. Carnot then became an officer in the French army's corps of engineers.

Carnot's father Lazare served as Napoleon's minister of the interior during the "Hundred Days", and, after Napoleon's final defeat in 1815, Lazare was forced into exile in the German city of Magdeburg. Carnot's position in the army, under the restored Bourbon monarchy of King Louis XVIII, became increasingly difficult. Lazare never returned to France, dying in Magdeburg in 1823.

Carnot became a captain in the Génie and was posted to various locations, where he inspected fortifications, tracked plans, and wrote many reports. However, it appeared that his recommendations were ignored and that his career was stagnating. On 15 September 1818, at the age of 22, he took a six-month leave to prepare for the entrance examination to the newly formed General Staff in Paris. Carnot passed the exam and joined the General Staff in January 1819, with the lower rank of lieutenant. He remained on call for military duty, but from then on he dedicated most of his attention to private intellectual pursuits and received only two-thirds pay.

=== Private studies and research ===
In Paris, Carnot befriended Nicolas Clément and Charles-Bernard Desormes and attended lectures on physics and chemistry at the Sorbonne and the Collège de France. He also attended the Conservatoire national des arts et métiers, where he followed the lectures on chemistry by Clément and those on economics by Jean-Baptiste Say. Carnot became interested in understanding the limits to improving the performance of steam engines, which led him to the investigations that became his Reflections on the Motive Power of Fire, published at his own expense in June 1824.

Carnot was finally promoted to his former rank of captain in September of 1827, but the following April he quit the army, having completed only fifteen months of active service and without right to a pension. In a directory of alumni of the École polytechnique published by Ambroise Fourcy in 1828, Carnot is listed as "maker of steam engines". This and some other indications suggest that Carnot may have been involved in a practical scheme for the improvement of steam engines, but no patents or other concrete evidences of that work have emerged.

=== Views and character ===
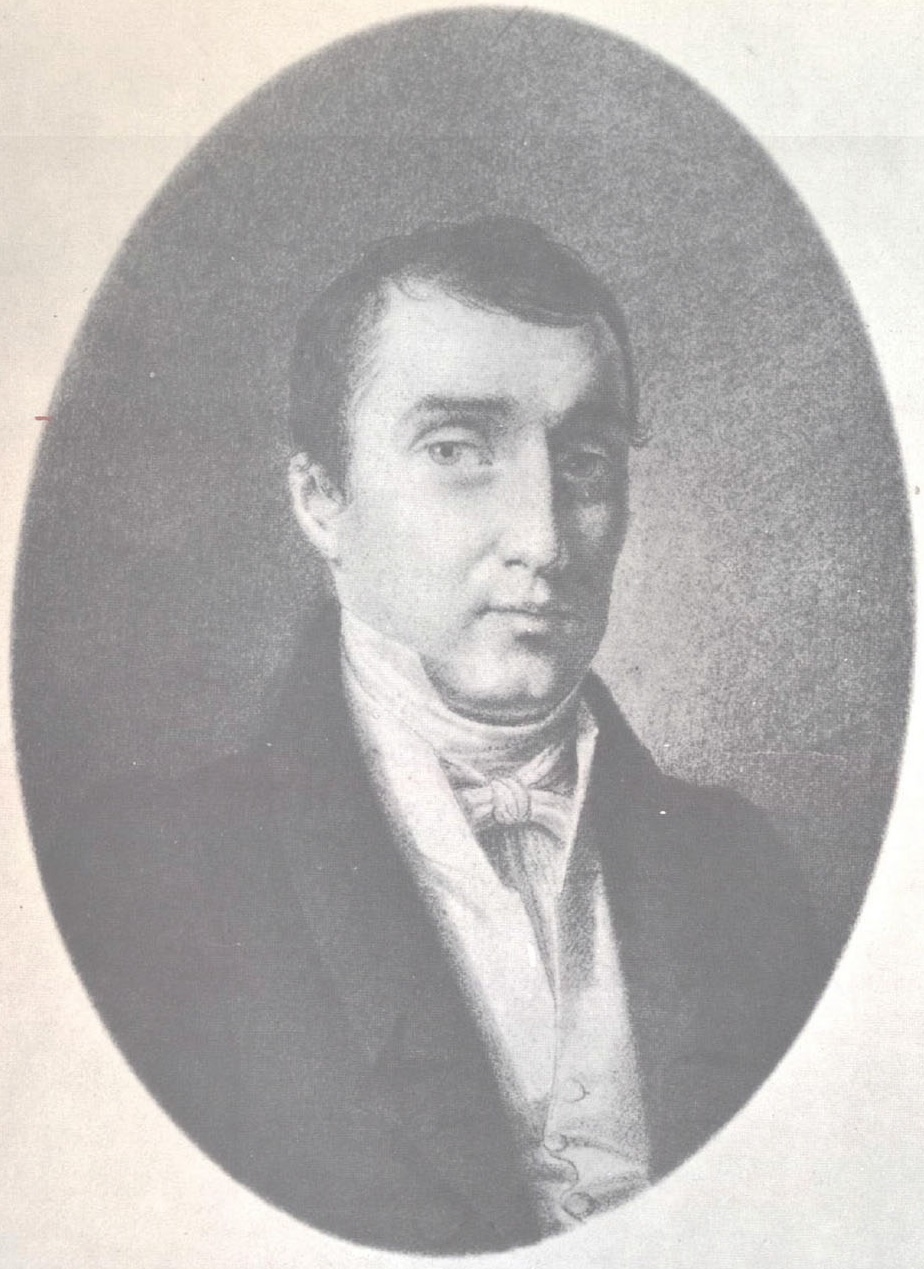
Drawing of Sadi Carnot by artist Despoix, Paris, 1830. The original is now in the French Academy of Sciences, Paris.

Carnot was interested in political economy. His political orientation was liberal, but he seems to have preferred the more interventionist doctrines of Jean de Sismondi to the laissez-faire policies advocated by classical liberal economists such as Say and David Ricardo. Out of Carnot's private writings on economics, only some fragmentary notes survive.

Carnot initially welcomed the July Revolution of 1830, which ended the Bourbonic regime under Charles X and established a new constitutional monarchy under "Citizen King" Louis Philippe. According to his brother Hippolyte, there was some discussion among leaders of the new regime of incorporating Sadi to the Chamber of Peers, as he could be considered to have inherited the Imperial title of "Count Carnot" that Napoleon had bestowed on his father Lazare in 1815. Nothing came of this, however, perhaps because Sadi's republican convictions prevented him from accepting a hereditary distinction.

According to recollections published long after Carnot's death by his brother Hippolyte, Carnot was an avid reader of Blaise Pascal, Molière and Jean de La Fontaine. Hippolyte recalled that Carnot was a philosophical theist who believed in divine causality but not in divine punishment. Carnot wrote in his private papers that "what to an ignorant man is chance, cannot be chance to one better instructed". He was critical of established religion, but spoke in favor of "the belief in an all-powerful Being, who loves us and watches over us".

Hippolyte also described his brother as a talented violin player, interested principally in the music of Jean-Baptiste Lully and Giovanni Battista Viotti, who also cultivated gymnastics, fencing, swimming, dancing, and skating. According to historian of science James F. Challey, "although sensitive and perceptive", Carnot "appeared extremely introverted, even aloof, to all but a few close friends". This may help explain why Carnot's work failed to make any significant impression within either the scientific or the engineering community during his lifetime.

=== Illness and death ===
In the summer of 1832 Carnot apparently suffered from a severe bout of scarlet fever. On 3 August, he was interned in a private sanatorium run by psychiatrist Jean-Étienne Esquirol and located in Ivry, just south of Paris. According to the hospital record, he was cured from "mania" but then died of cholera on 24 August. Carnot was buried in the old cemetery of Ivry, close to what is now the Mairie d'Ivry station.

== Reflections on the Motive Power of Fire ==
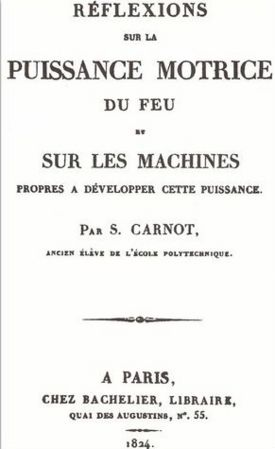
Title page of Carnot's Réflexions sur la puissance motrice du feu ("Reflections on the motive power of fire"), published in Paris in June 1824

Carnot's contribution to the development of thermodynamics is contained in his only published work, a short book titled Réflexions sur la puissance motrice du feu et sur les machines propres à développer cette puissance ("Reflections on the Motive Power of Fire and on Machines Fitted to Develop that Power") published in Paris in June of 1824 by Bachelier, with Carnot himself paying for the printing of the 600 copies. The work attracted little attention during his lifetime and virtually disappeared from booksellers and libraries. An article published in 1834 (two years after Carnot's death and ten years after the publication of his book) by the engineer and fellow polytechnicien Émile Clapeyron finally succeeded in calling attention to Carnot's work, which some years later was used by Lord Kelvin and Rudolf Clausius to define the concepts of absolute temperature, entropy, and the second law of thermodynamics.

=== Background ===
Thomas Newcomen invented the first practical piston-operated steam engine in 1712. Some 50 years after that, James Watt made his celebrated improvements, which were responsible for greatly increasing the usefulness of steam engines. When Carnot became interested in the subject in the 1820s, steam engines were in increasingly wide application in industry and their economic importance was widely recognized. Compound engines (engines with more than one stage of expansion) had already been invented, and there was even a crude internal combustion engine, known as the pyréolophore and built by the brothers Claude and Nicéphore Niépce, with which Carnot was familiar and which he described in some detail in his book.

That practical work on steam engines and the intuitive understanding among engineers of some of the principles underlying their operation co-existed, however, with an almost complete lack of a scientific understanding of the physical phenomena associated with heat. The principle of conservation of energy had not yet been clearly articulated and the ideas surrounding it were fragmentary and controversial. Carnot himself accepted the view, prevalent in France and associated with the work of Antoine Lavoisier, that heat is a weightless and invisible fluid, called "caloric", which may be liberated by chemical reactions and which flows from bodies at higher temperature to bodies at lower temperature.

In his book, Carnot sought to answer basic questions: "Is there a limit to the work that can be generated from a given heat source?" and "Can the performance of an engine be improved by replacing steam with a different working fluid?". Engineers in Carnot's time had tried, using highly pressurized steam and other fluids, to improve the efficiency of engines. In these early stages of engine development, the efficiency of a typical engine – the useful work it was able to do when a given quantity of fuel was burned – was only about 5–7%.

Carnot's book was only 118 pages long and covered a wide range of topics about heat engines in what Carnot must have intended to be a form accessible to a wide public. He made minimal use of mathematics, which he confined to elementary algebra and arithmetic, except in some footnotes. Carnot discussed the relative merits of air and steam as working fluids, the merits of various aspects of steam-engine design, and even included some ideas of his own regarding possible practical improvements. However, the central part of the book was an abstract treatment of an idealized engine (the Carnot cycle) with which the author sought to clarify the fundamental principles that govern all heat engines, independently of the details of their design or operation. This resulted in an idealized thermodynamic system upon which exact calculations could be made, and avoided the complications introduced by many of the crude features of the contemporary steam engines.

=== Carnot cycle ===
Cross section of Carnot's heat engine. In this diagram, abcd is a cylindrical vessel, cd is a movable piston, and A and B are thermal reservoirs at different temperatures. The vessel may be placed in contact with either reservoir or removed from both. This is Figure 1 in Carnot's book.

Carnot considered an idealized process in which heat from a thermal reservoir at a high temperature flows very slowly (and thus reversibly) into the gas contained in a cylinder enclosed by a movable piston. This gives an isothermal expansion of the gas that pushes out the piston and can be used to perform useful work. This does not yet constitute an engine because the piston must be returned to its original position in order for the machine to run cyclically.

Carnot then proposed reducing the temperature of the gas by an adiabatic expansion, during which the cylinder is thermally isolated so as to prevent heat from entering or leaving the gas. Once the temperature of the gas has reached the same value as that of the colder reservoir, the cylinder is put into thermal contact with that reservoir and the gas undergoes an isothermal compression, during which it very slowly (and thus reversibly) rejects heat into the reservoir.

To close the cycle, the temperature of the gas in the cylinder can be raised by adiabatic compression, until it reaches a value equal to the temperature of the hotter reservoir. This succession of isothermal expansion, adiabatic expansion, isothermal compression, and adiabatic compression can then be repeated as many times as desired, generating a net amount of work each time, at the expense of a transfer of heat from the hotter reservoir to the colder reservoir.

As Carnot explained, such a cycle constitutes the most efficient heat engine possible (given the temperatures of the two reservoirs). This is partly because of the (trivial) absence of friction, heat leakage, or other incidental wasteful processes, but mainly because it involves no conduction of heat between parts of the engine at different temperatures. Carnot understood that the conduction of heat between bodies at different temperatures is a wasteful and irreversible process, which must be minimized if the heat engine is to achieve its maximum efficiency.

Carnot cycle in a pressure vs. volume diagram. This graphical representation of Carnot's cycle was introduced by Émile Clapeyron in 1834.

Because Carnot's cycle is reversible, it can also be used as a refrigerator: if an external agent supplies the needed mechanical work to move the piston, the sequence of transformations of the gas will absorb heat from the colder reservoir and reject it into the hotter reservoir. Carnot argued that no engine operating between reservoirs at two given temperatures could deliver more work than his reversible cycle. Otherwise, the more efficient engine could run Carnot's cycle in reverse as a refrigerator, thus returning all of the "caloric" from the colder back to the hotter reservoir, with some positive amount of work left over to perform a further useful task. Carnot assumed that such a process, in which no net "caloric" was consumed while positive work could be done forever, would be a perpetual motion and therefore forbidden by the laws of physics.

This argument led Carnot to conclude that:

The motive power of heat is independent of the agents employed to realize it; its quantity is fixed solely by the temperatures of the bodies between which is effected, finally, the transfer of caloric.

Carnot understood that his idealized engine would have the maximum possible thermal efficiency given the temperatures of the two reservoirs, but he did not calculate the value of that efficiency because of the ambiguities associated with the various temperature scales used by scientists at the time:

In the fall of caloric, motive power undoubtedly increases with the difference of temperature between the warm and cold bodies, but we do not know whether it is proportional to this difference.

=== Phase transitions ===
Later in his book, Carnot considered a heat engine operating very close to the boiling point of water, alcohol, or some other working fluid. The transition between the liquid and vapor phases involves a sudden change in density (and therefore in the volume occupied by the fluid) while a latent heat is needed to transform some amount of the fluid from one phase to the other as the temperature stays constant. This is modernly called a first-order phase transition. By requiring that the volume change associated with such a transition not be available to construct what he characterized as a perpetual motion device, Carnot arrived at what would later be formalized mathematically as the "Clausius–Clapeyron relation". In the Feynman Lectures on Physics, theoretical physicist Richard Feynman stresses that this result is due to Carnot and gives a modernized version of Carnot's original argument.

In 1849, James Thomson applied Carnot's reasoning to the freezing of water (i.e., the phase transition between liquid water and ice), and concluded that it predicted that the melting point of ice must decrease if an external pressure is applied to it, an effect that no one had ever proposed or studied before. James Thomson's prediction was later confirmed experimentally by his brother William Thomson (the future Lord Kelvin), who found that the data agreed fully with Carnot's analysis. Kelvin later said of Carnot's argument that "nothing in the whole range of Natural Philosophy is more remarkable than the establishment of general laws by such a process of reasoning."

=== Reception ===
Carnot published his book in June 1824, and it was presented at that time to the French Academy of Sciences by Pierre-Simon Girard. Girard also published a praiseful but rather broad review of the book in the Revue encyclopédique, but after that the book seems to have fallen into obscurity. It was only after the publication of an extensive commentary and explication of Carnot's work by Émile Clapeyron in 1834 that engineers and scientists began to take an interest in Carnot's contributions. Clapeyron's article was translated into English in 1837 and into German in 1843.

William Thomson read Clapeyron's paper in 1845, while visiting the Paris laboratory of Henri Regnault, but it was only at the end of 1848 that Thomson was able to read Carnot's original work, in a copy provided to him by Lewis Gordon. Independently of Thomson, the German physicist Rudolf Clausius also based his study of thermodynamics on Carnot's work. Clausius modified Carnot's arguments to make them compatible with the mechanical equivalence of heat. This then led Clausius to define the concept of entropy and to formulate the second law of thermodynamics.

Carnot's text was re-printed in 1871 in the Annales Scientifiques of the École normale supérieure, and again by Gauthier-Villars in 1878 with the collaboration of Hippolyte Carnot. An English translation of the book was published in 1890 by R. H. Thurston. That version has been reprinted in recent decades by Dover. In 1892, Lord Kelvin referred to Carnot's essay as "an epoch-making gift to science".

Carnot published his book in the heyday of steam engines. His theory explained the advantage of engines that use superheated steam, since they absorb heat from a reservoir at a higher temperature. Carnot's work did not, however, lead to any immediate practical improvements of steam technologies. It was only towards the end of the nineteenth century that engineers deliberately implemented Carnot's key concepts: that the efficiency of a heat is improved by increasing the temperature at which heat is drawn and by minimizing the flow of heat between bodies at different temperatures. In particular, Rudolf Diesel used Carnot's analysis in his design of the diesel engine, in which heat is injected at a much higher temperature than in the older steam engines, and in which the heat from the combustion of the fuel goes primarily into expanding the air in the cylinder (rather than into increasing its temperature).

== Death and posterity ==
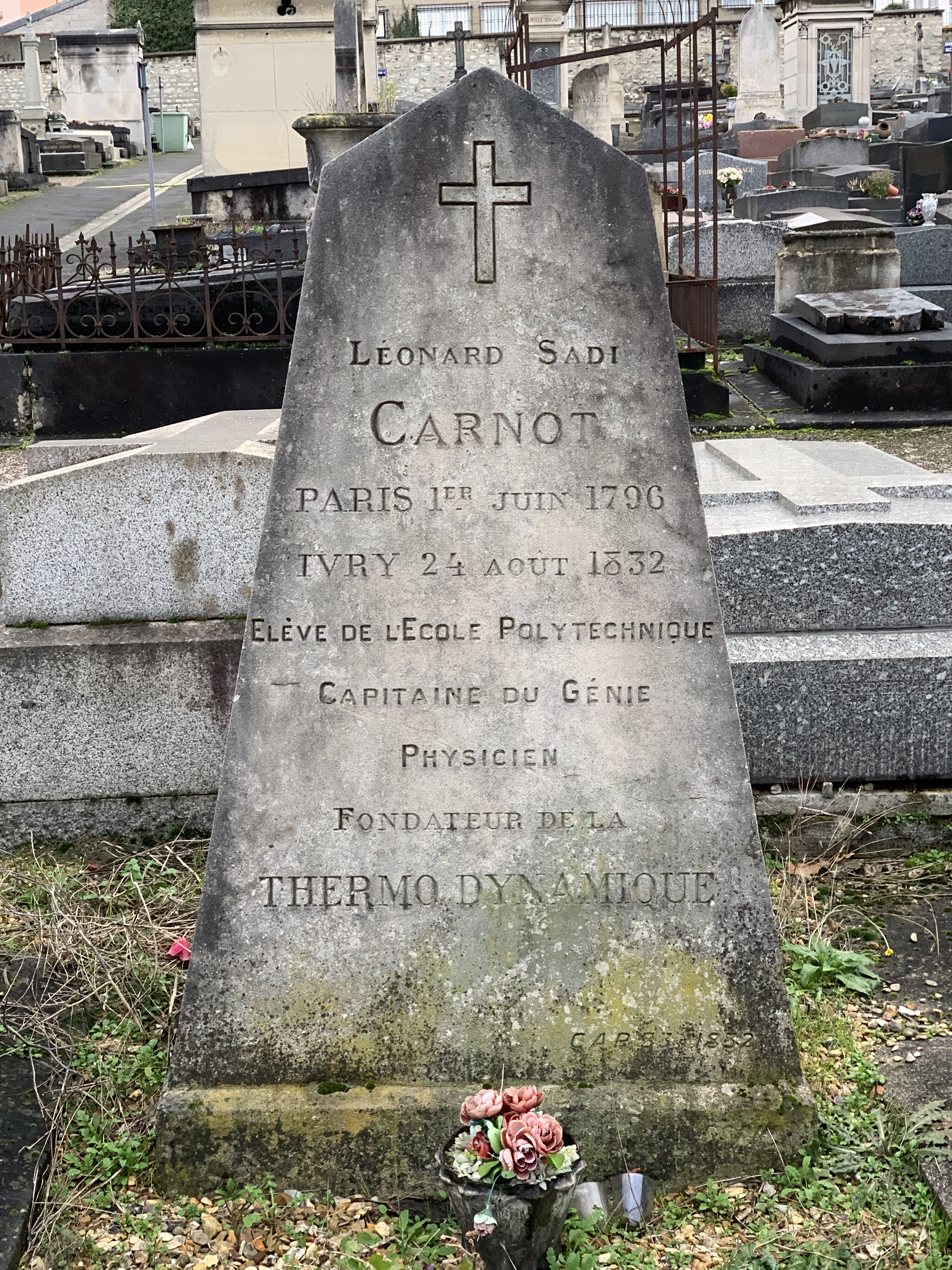
Grave of Carnot in the old cemetery of Ivry-sur-Seine

Carnot's younger brother Hippolyte obscured the details of Carnot's death and destroyed most of his personal papers. Much later, in 1878, when Carnot's essay had come to be widely recognized as a founding document of the new science of thermodynamics, Hippolyte sponsored the publication of a new edition that included a "Biographical notice on Sadi Carnot" written by Hippolyte, along with some "Excerpts from unpublished notes by Sadi on mathematics, physics and other subjects". These are the only sources of information on many aspects of Carnot's life and thought. In the opinion of historian of science Arthur Birembaut, the "smokescreen" that Hippolyte drew over his brother's life makes it impossible now to reconstruct the details of Carnot's career, his relationship with other physicists and engineers, and the circumstances of his death.

Among the private notes published by Hippolyte in 1878, there is material indicating that Carnot had, by the spring of 1832, rejected the caloric theory and accepted the equivalence of heat and work. In his notes, Carnot wrote that:

Heat is simply motive power, or rather motion that has changed form. It is a movement among the particles of bodies. Wherever there is destruction of motive power there is, at the same time, production of heat in quantity exactly proportional to the quantity of motive power destroyed. Reciprocally, wherever there is destruction of heat there is production of motive power.

In those same notes, Carnot estimated that 1 kilocalorie is the equivalent of 370 kg·m, whereas the currently accepted value is 427 kg·m. Carnot did not, however, publish any of that work. It is possible that his uncertainty about the consequences for the validity of his previous analysis in the Reflections of rejecting the caloric theory might explain why he did not follow up on his work of 1824 before his untimely death.

Following the work of Kelvin and Clausius, Carnot came to be widely regarded as the "father of thermodynamics". In 1970, the International Astronomical Union named the lunar crater Carnot in his honor. In 1991, the minor planet 12289 was also named after Carnot.

== Bibliography ==
- Almanza, Morgan; Horsin Molinaro, Hélène; Lo Bue, Martino (8 January 2024). "Sadi Carnot et la naissance de la thermodynamique" [Sadi Carnot and the birth of thermodynamics] (PDF). CultureSciences de l'Ingénieur (in French). École normale supérieure Paris-Saclay.
- Asimov, Isaac (1982). "Carnot, Nicolas Léonard Sadi". Asimov's Biographical Encyclopedia of Science and Technology (second revised ed.). Doubleday. pp. 331–332. ISBN 978-0-385-17771-9.
- Birembaut, Arthur (1974). "À propos des notices biographiques sur Sadi Carnot: quelques documents inédits" [Regarding the biographical notices of Sadi Carnot: some unpublished documents]. Revue d'histoire des sciences (in French). 27 (4): 355–370. doi:10.3406/rhs.1974.1107. JSTOR 23631750.
- Bryant, Lynwood (July 1976). "The Development of the Diesel Engine". Technology and Culture. 17 (3): 432–446. doi:10.2307/3103523. JSTOR 3103523.
- Carnot, Sadi (1890). Reflections on the Motive Power of Heat. Thurston, Robert Henry (editor and translator). New York: J. Wiley & Sons.
- Carnot, Sadi (1988). Mendoza, E. (ed.). Reflections on the Motive Power of Fire And Other Papers on the Second Law of Thermodynamics. Mineola, NY: Dover Publication. ISBN 978-0486446417.
- Challey, James F. (1981). "Carnot, Nicolas Léonard Sadi". In Gillispie, C.C. (ed.). Dictionary of Scientific Biography. Vol. III. Charles Scribner's Sons. pp. 79–84. ISBN 0-684-16964-9.
- Chisholm, Hugh, ed. (1911). "Carnot, Sadi Nicolas Léonhard" . Encyclopædia Britannica. Vol. 5 (11th ed.). Cambridge University Press.
- Dixit, Uday Shanker; Hazarika, Manjuri; Davim, J. Paulo (2017). "History of Thermodynamics and Heat Transfer". A Brief History of Mechanical Engineering. Springer. pp. 73–98. doi:10.1007/978-3-319-42916-8_4. ISBN 978-3-319-42914-4.
- Feynman, Richard (1963). Illustrations of Thermodynamics. The Feynman Lectures on Physics. California Institute of Technology.
- Fox, Robert (2012). "Sadi Carnot on Political Economy. Science, Morals, and Public Policy in Restoration France". In Buchwald, Jed Z. (ed.). A Master of Science: History Essays in Honor of Charles Coulston Gillispie. Archimedes. Vol. 30. Springer. pp. 412–427. doi:10.1007/978-94-007-2627-7_23. ISBN 978-94-007-2626-0.
- Gillispie, Charles Coulston; Pisano, Raffaele (2014). Lazare and Sadi Carnot: A Scientific and Filial Relationship (2 ed.). Springer. doi:10.1007/978-94-017-8011-7. ISBN 978-94-017-8010-0.
- Klein, Martin J. (1969). "Gibbs on Clausius". Historical Studies in the Physical Sciences. 1: 127–149. doi:10.2307/27757297. JSTOR 27757297.
- Klein, Martin J. (1974). "Carnot's contribution to thermodynamics". Physics Today. 27 (8): 23–28. Bibcode:1974PhT....27h..23K. doi:10.1063/1.3128802.
- O'Connor, J.J.; Robertson, E.F. (October 1998). "Sadi Nicolas Léonard Carnot". MacTutor History of Mathematics Archive. School of Mathematics and Statistics, University of St Andrews.
- Taton, René; et al. (1976). Sadi Carnot et l'essor de la thermodynamique [Sadi Carnot and the rise of thermodynamics] (in French). Paris: Éditions du C.N.R.S. ISBN 9782222018186.
- Thomson, William (1849). "An Account of Carnot's Theory of the Motive Power of Heat; with Numerical Results deduced from Regnault's Experiments on Steam". Transactions of the Edinburgh Royal Society. 16 (5): 541–574. doi:10.1017/S0080456800022481.
- Wilson, S.S. (August 1981). "Sadi Carnot". Scientific American. 245 (2): 102–114. Bibcode:1981SciAm.245b.134W. doi:10.1038/scientificamerican0881-134.
