= Ernest Picard =

French politician (1821–1877)

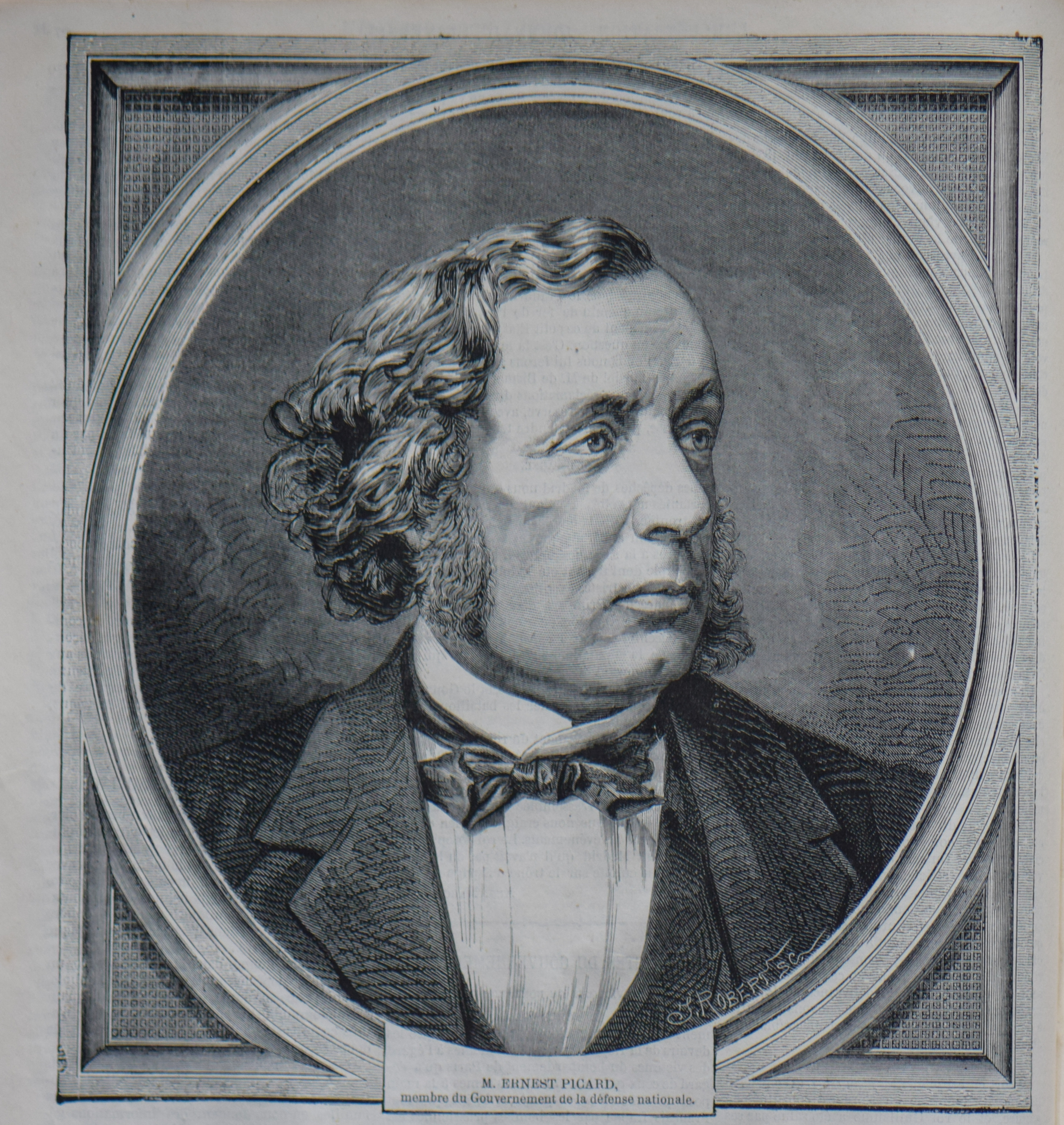
1871 engraving of Ernest Picard, member of the government and the national defense of Paris

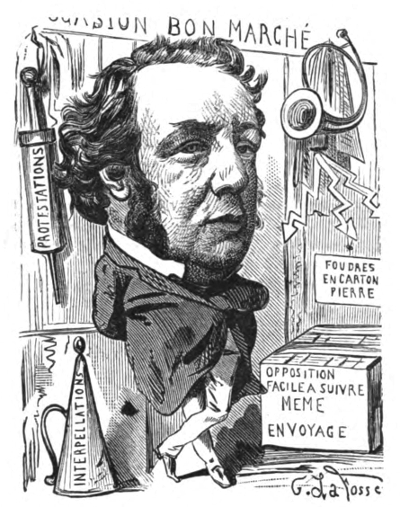
Caricature of Ernest Picard

Louis Joseph Ernest Picard (24 December 1821 – 13 May 1877) was a French politician.

== Life ==
Louis Joseph Ernest Picard was born in Paris. After taking his doctorate in law in 1846 he joined the Parisian bar. Elected to the corps législatif in 1858, he became a follower of Émile Ollivier. As Ollivier moved towards the government standpoint, Picard, one of the members of the group known as Les Cinq, veered more to the left.

In the 1860s Picard was an active member of the Conférence Molé, as were Léon Gambetta, Clément Laurier and Léon Renault. At that time the Molé met in the Café Procope in the Rue de l'Ancienne-Comédie, the oldest coffee house in Paris.

In 1868 he founded a weekly democratic journal, L'Electeur libre, and in 1869 was elected both for Hérault and Paris, electing to sit for the former. From 4 September 1870 he held the portfolio of finance in the government of National Defence. In January 1871 he accompanied Jules Favre to Versailles to arrange the capitulation of Paris, and the next month he became minister of the interior in Adolphe Thiers's cabinet.

Attacked both by the monarchist and the republican press, he resigned in May. Later in the year he was sent as ambassador to Brussels, where he remained for two years. On his return to Paris he resumed his seat in the Left centre, and in 1875 became life senator. He died in Paris.

== Sources ==
- Fraser's Magazine (1881), "Léon Michael Gambetta", The Eclectic Magazine of Foreign Literature, Science, and Art, Leavitt, Trow, & Company
