= Sonia de La Provôté =

French politician

Member of the French Senate for Calvados
- Incumbent
- Assumed office 1 October 2017
- Preceded by: Jean-Léonce Dupont

Deputy Mayor of Caen
- In office 5 April 2014 – 1 October 2017
- Mayor: Joël Bruneau
- Preceded by: Corinne Féret
- Succeeded by: Catherine Pradal-Chazarenc

Personal details
- Born: Sonia Juhel; 25 December 1968 (age 57) Caen, France
- Party: The Centrists; UDI
- Spouse: Marc de La Provôté
- Education: Lycée Malherbe
- Alma mater: University of Caen Normandy
- Profession: Physician

Sonia de La Provôté (born 25 December 1968) is a French politician, member of the French Senate. She was elected in 2017 and again in 2020. She represents the department of Calvados.
