= Charles Bernard Desormes =

French physicist and chemist (1777–1862)

- Born: 3 June 1777; Dijon, France
- Died: 30 August 1862 (aged 85); Verberie, France
- Scientific career
- Fields: Physics

Charles Bernard Desormes (French: [dezɔʁm]; 3 June 1777 – 30 August 1862) was a French physicist and chemist. He determined the ratio of the specific heats of gases in 1819. He did this and almost all his scientific work in collaboration with his son-in-law Nicolas Clément (1779–1841). Clément and Desormes correctly determined the composition of carbon disulfide (CS_{2}) and carbon monoxide (CO) in 1801–02. In 1806 they elucidated all the chemical reactions that take place during the production of sulfuric acid by the lead chamber method, as used in industrial chemistry. In 1813 they made a study of iodine and its compounds.

Desormes was born in Dijon, Côte-d'Or. He was a student at the École Polytechnique in Paris from 1794, when it opened, and subsequently worked there as a demonstrator. Désormes met Clément at the Ecole Polytechnique 1801, beginning a scientific collaboration that lasted until 1824. He left the Ecole 1804 to establish an alum refinery at Verberie, Oise, with Clément and Joseph Montgolfier, who had earlier pioneered balloon flight. Desormes was elected counsellor for Oise 1830 and in 1848 to the national assembly, in which he sat with the moderate republicans. He died in Verberie.
