= Corinne Féret =

French politician

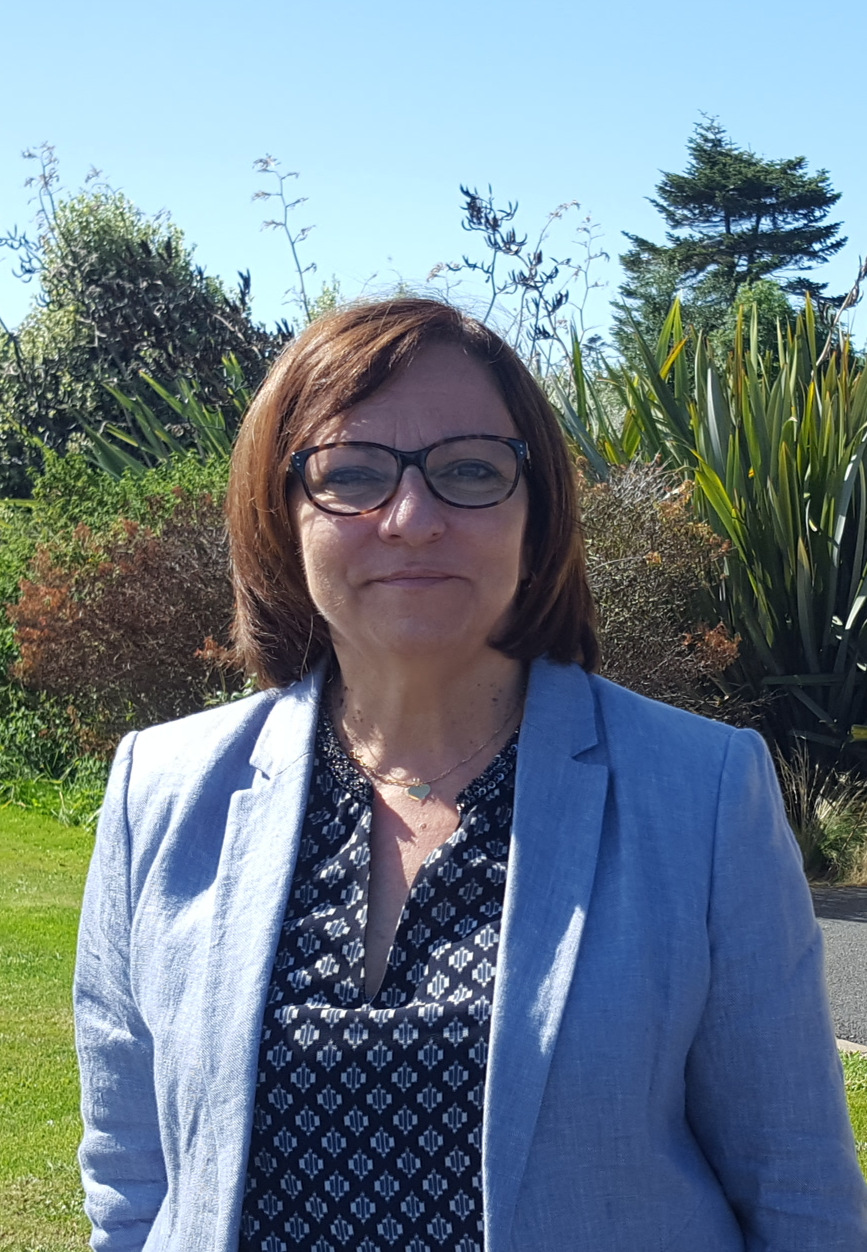
- Corinne Féret in 2020

Member of the French Senate for Calvados
- Incumbent
- Assumed office 12 June 2015
- Preceded by: François Aubey

Member of the Departmental council of Calvados
- In office 2 April 2015 – 1 July 2021
- President: Jean-Léonce Dupont
- Preceded by: Antoine Casini
- Succeeded by: Martine Kerguélen

Deputy mayor of Caen
- In office 23 March 2008 – 5 April 2014
- Mayor: Philippe Duron
- Preceded by: Daniel Detey
- Succeeded by: Sonia de La Provôté

Personal details
- Born: 17 September 1961 (age 64) Caen, France
- Party: Socialist Party

Corinne Féret (born 17 September 1961) is a French politician. She represents the department of Calvados in the French Senate since 2015 as a member of the Socialist Party. She was the first woman elected to the Senate for that department.

The daughter of Jean-Claude Féret, who worked for Électricité de France, and the granddaughter of a railway worker, she was born in the La Guérinière (neighbourhood)|La Guérinière neighbourhood of Caen. She joined the Socialist Party in 1982. In 2008, she became first deputy for Caen mayor Philippe Duron. Féret was elected to the departmental council in March 2015. She was elected to the Senate in June 2015, replacing François Aubey who was removed from office by the Constitutional Council.

== Biography ==
Corinne Féret was born in 1961 in the La Guérinière neighborhood of Caen. The granddaughter of a railway worker, her mother took care of the family while her father worked for EDF and was active in the CGT union. She holds a university technical degree.

She voted for François Mitterrand for the first time in the 1981 presidential election. She joined the Socialist Party in 1982, then became treasurer and federal secretary for women's rights.

From 1989 to 1997, she was Yvette Roudy assistant at Lisieux Town Hall.

In March 2004, she was elected regional councilor in sixth place on the left-wing coalition list in Calvados (department) during the regional elections.

In March 2008, she was ranked second on the list of Philippe Duron, the Socialist Party candidate for mayor of Caen; following his victory, she became first deputy mayor in charge of municipal staff, gender equality, and the time office. She also became vice-president of the Caen la Mer urban community.

In March 2010, she headed the left-wing list in Calvados during the 2010 French regional elections. She was re-elected and became vice-president of the Basse-Normandie Regional Council, responsible for education and higher education.

In March 2014, she was once again ranked second on the outgoing mayor's list. The left-wing list was defeated in the second round, so she now serves as a minority city councilor and is a member of the Communauté urbaine Caen la Mer community.

In March 2015, she was elected departmental councilor for the Canton of Caen-4 alongside Gilles Déterville. She resigned from her position as regional councilor and handed over her seat to Gérard Leneveu.

On June 12, 2015, she became senator for Calvados (department) replacing François Aubey, who was dismissed by the Constitutional Council. She thus became the first woman from the department, across all political parties, to sit in the Palais du Luxembourg. She resigned from her position as municipal councilor at Caen City Hall and handed over her seat to Lilian Bellet. She was replaced in the urban community by Julie Rousinaud.

She left the Socialist Party to join Bernard Cazeneuve in 2023.
