= Ambroise Dupont =

French politician (1937–2025)

Member of the French Senate for Calvados
- In office 1989–2014

Personal details
- Born: 11 May 1937 Victot-Pontfol, France
- Died: 18 September 2025 (aged 88)
- Party: UMP

Ambroise Dupont (11 May 1937 – 18 September 2025) was a French politician who was a member of the Senate of France. He represented the Calvados department as a member of UMP political party.

Dupont died on 18 September 2025, at the age of 88.

== Sources ==
- Page on the Senate website
