= Auguste-Jean-Marie Vermorel =

French journalist (1841–1871)

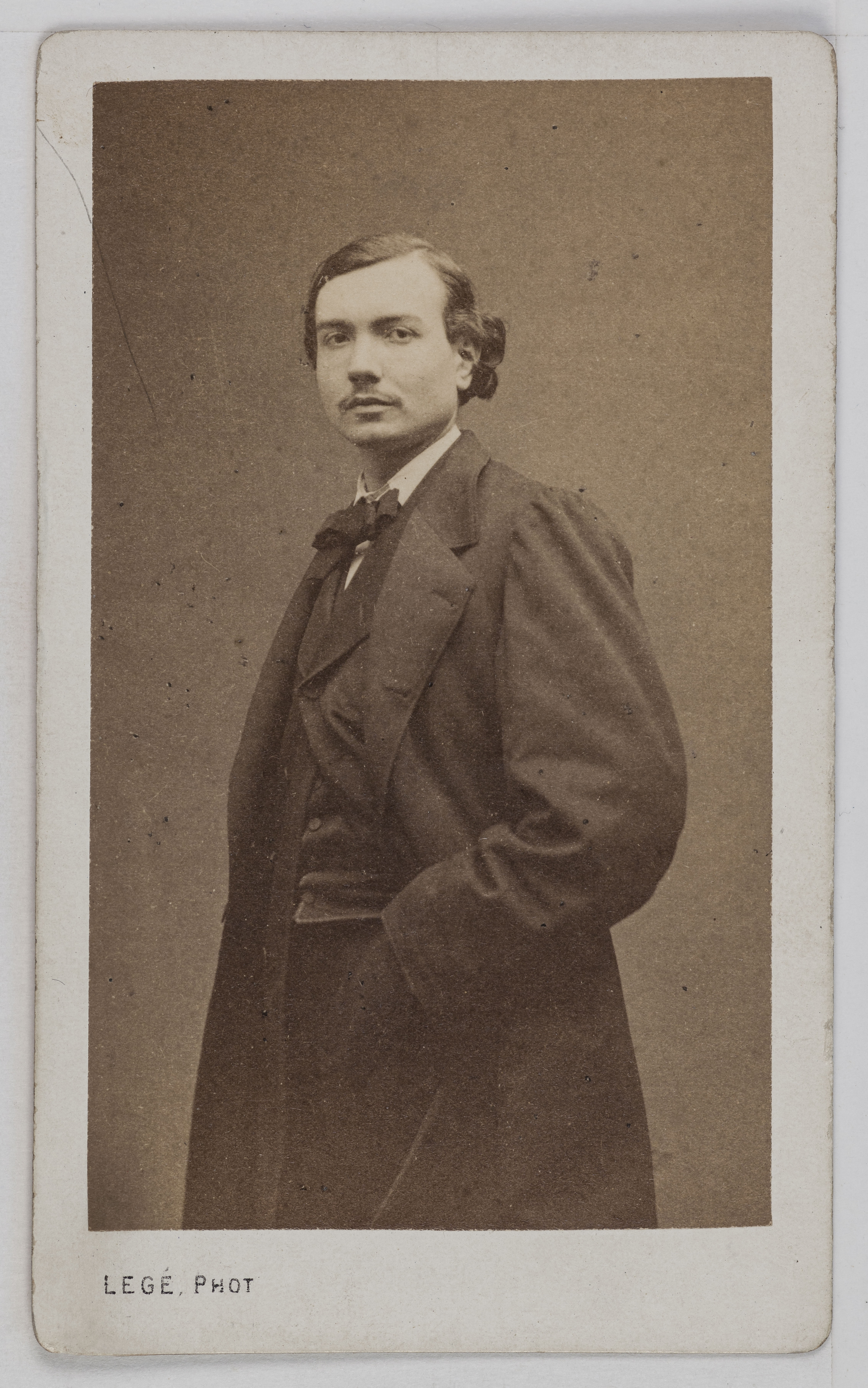
Auguste Vermorel

Auguste-Jean-Marie Vermorel (21 June 1841 – 20 June 1871) was a French socialist writer, editor and journalist and a leader of the Paris Commune.

== Biography ==
He was born at Denicé. A radical and socialist writer and activist, he founded the journal La Jeune France (Young France) in 1861; then became editor-in-chief of Du Courrier français. He was attached to the staff of the Presse (1864), the Liberté (1866) and worked also on the journal La Reforme; his attacks on the government in that organ led to his imprisonment. He also published Les Hommes de 1848 (The Men of 1848) in 1868, Les Hommes de 1851 (The men of 1851) and Les Vampires (The Vampires, an electoral pamphlet) in 1869 and Le Parti socialiste (the Socialist Party) in 1870. Previously he had published books on the works of the primary leaders of the French Revolution including Danton, Robespierre and Jean-Paul Marat as well as works on various other subjects.

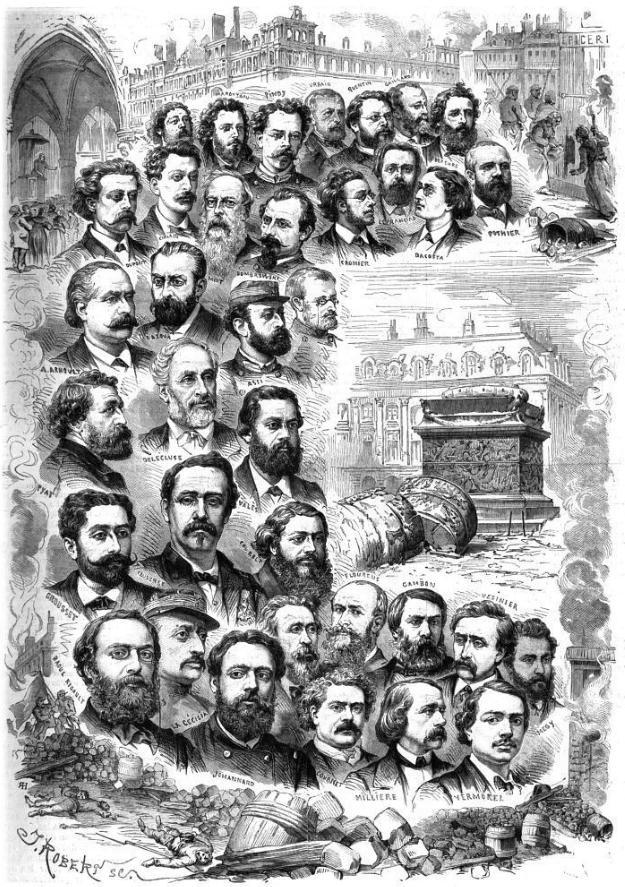
The leaders of the Paris Commune with the destroyed Column of the Place Vendome; Vermorel's portrait is at the lower right corner of the image.

Imprisoned by the Second Empire because of his political opinions, he was released by the Proclamation of the Republic on September 4, 1870. But he was again imprisoned for his participation in the uprising of October 31, 1870 against the policy of the Government of National Defense . After the end of the siege of Paris by the Germans (September 1870 - March 1871), he retired to the provinces, but returned to Paris after the establishment of the Paris Commune on March 18, 1871. On March 26, he was elected to the Council of the Commune by the 18th arrondissement; He served on the Justice Commission, then the Executive Commission and finally that of the Sûreté générale. He published two newspapers, L'Ordre (Order) and L'Ami du Peuple (The Friend of the People), each one suppressed after just four issues. He voted against the creation of the Committee of Public Safety, as part of the minority on the Council of the Municipality. During the Semaine sanglante (Bloody Week), he fought on the barricades where he was seriously injured on May 25, 1871. After the defeat and destruction of the Commune by the German and French armies, he was arrested and transferred as a prisoner of the French government to Versailles, where he was allowed to die slowly for lack of medical care at the age of 29. He is buried in the cemetery of Denicé.
