= Timeline of Caen =

The following is a timeline of the history of the city of Caen, France.

== Prior to 19th century ==
- 912 – Caen becomes western capital of Normandy.
- 1047 – Truce of God declared at a church council in Caen
- 1060 – Château de Caen (castle) built by William the Conqueror (approximate date).
- 1063 - Abbey of Saint-Étienne, Caen founded by William the Conqueror.
- 1077 – Saint Stephen's Church, Caen consecrated.
- 1087 – Burial of William the Conqueror.
- 1314 – Public clock installed.
- 1346 – Battle of Caen (1346).
- 1417 – Siege of Caen (1417) by English forces.
- 1432 – University of Caen Normandy founded by Henry VI of England.
- 1450 – Siege of Caen (1450); French in power.
- 1460s – Maison des Quatrans (residence) construction begins.
- 1480 – Printing press in operation.
- 1527 – Hôtel de Than (mansion) built (approximate date).
- 1540 – Hôtel d'Escoville (mansion) built.
- 1652 – Académie des Sciences, Arts et Belles-Lettres de Caen founded.
- 1710 – Hôtel de Blangy (mansion) construction begins (approximate date).
- 1736 – Jardin des plantes de Caen (garden) established.
- 1790 – Caen becomes part of the Calvados souveraineté.
- 1793
  - Agitation by the Girondins.
  - Population: 34,805.
- 1796 – Archives départementales du Calvados established.

== 19th century ==
- 1809 – Musée des Beaux-Arts de Caen and Bibliothèque de Caen open.
- 1820 – Société de médecine de Caen (medical society) founded.
- 1821 – Caen Chamber of Commerce established.
- 1823 – Société linnéenne de Normandie (learned society) founded.
- 1824 – Société des antiquaires de Normandie (historical society) founded.
- 1828 – Journal de Caen et de la Normandie newspaper begins publication.^{(fr)}
- 1843 – Paris-Caen railway begins operating.
- 1855 - Société des beaux-arts de Caen (art society) founded.
- 1857
  - Caen Canal opens.
  - Gare de Caen opens
  - Mantes-la-Jolie–Cherbourg railway begins operating.
- 1860 – Séminaire des Eudistes de Caen built.
- 1875
  - Compagnie du chemin de fer de Caen à la mer railway begins operating.
  - Gare de Caen Saint-Martin (rail station) opens.
- 1886 – Population: 43,809.

== 20th century ==
- 1901 – Tram begins operating.
- 1911 – Population: 46,934.
- 1913 – Stade Malherbe Caen association football club formed.
- 1925 – Stade de Venoix (stadium) opens.
- 1934 – Gare de Caen (railway station) rebuilt.
- 1939 – Military Caen-Carpiquet Air Base established.
- 1940 – German occupation begins.
- 1944
  - June–August: Battle for Caen fought, during the Battle of Normandy.
  - 19 July: German forces ousted from city.
- 1945 – Rebuilding of Caen begins.
  - Yves Guillou becomes mayor
- 1954 – Population: 67,851.
- 1959 – Jean-Marie Louvel becomes mayor.
- 1961 – Lycée Malherbe built.
- 1962
  - Lycée Augustin-Fresnel (Lycée) opens in La Grâce de Dieu (Caen) neighborhood.
  - Caen twinned with Würzburg, Germany.
- 1965 – Hôtel de Ville moves into the Abbey of Saint-Étienne building.
- 1967 – Civilian Caen – Carpiquet Airport in use.
- 1968 – Population: 110,262.
- 1970 – Jean-Marie Girault becomes mayor.
- 1973 – Canton of Caen-1, 2, 3, 4, 5, and 6 created.
- 1982 – Orchestre Régional de Basse-Normandie established in nearby Mondeville.
- 1986 – Postal Museum opens.
- 1987 – Caen twinned with Portsmouth, United Kingdom.
- 1988 – Mémorial de Caen opens.
- 1991 – Caen twinned with Alexandria, Virginia and Nashville, USA.
- 1992 – Caen twinned with Thiès, Senegal.
- 1993 – Stade Michel d'Ornano (stadium) opens.
- 1999 – Population: 113,987.

== 21st century ==
- 2001 – Brigitte Le Brethon becomes mayor
- 2002 – Caen Guided Light Transit (TVR) begins operating.
- 2008 – Philippe Duron becomes mayor
- 2012 – Population: 108,365.
- 2014 – Joël Bruneau becomes mayor.
- 2015 – December: Normandy regional election, 2015 held.
- 2016 – Caen becomes part of Normandy.
- 2017 – Caen Guided Light Transit ends operating.
- 2019 – Caen tramway begins operating.
- 2024 – Aristide Olivier becomes mayor

== See also ==
- History of Caen
- History of Caen
- List of mayors of Caen
- List of heritage sites in Caen
- History of Normandy region

other cities in the Normandy region

- Timeline of Le Havre
- Timeline of Rouen

== Bibliography ==
=== in English ===
- "Caen". Traveller's Guide through France (2nd ed.). Paris: Galignani. 1819.
- "Caen". Traveller's Classical Guide Through France. Paris: Maison, successeur de Audin. 1840. "Translated from the French"
- "Caen", Handbook for Travellers in France, London: John Murray, 1861
- C. B. Black (1876), "Caen", Guide to the North of France, Edinburgh: Adam and Charles Black
- "Caen", Northern France (4th ed.), Leipzig: Karl Baedeker, 1905, hdl:2027/mdp.39015063869328, OCLC 01820283
- "Caen" . Encyclopædia Britannica. Vol. 4 (11th ed.). 1910. p. 936.
- Benjamin Vincent (1910), "Caen", Haydn's Dictionary of Dates (25th ed.), London: Ward, Lock & Co., hdl:2027/uc2.ark:/13960/t41r6xh8t

=== in French ===
- Pierre Daniel Huet (1706). Les origines de la ville de Caen (in French) (2nd ed.). Rouen: Maurry.
- Heinrich August Ottokar Reichard (1816). "Caen". Guide des voyageurs en Europe (in French). Vol. France (8th ed.). Paris: Hyacinthe Langlois. hdl:2027/uiuo.ark:/13960/t4xh2962k.
- Jean-Baptiste-Joseph Champagnac [in French] (1839). "Caen". Manuel des dates, en forme de dictionnaire. Perisse frères.
- Gervais de La Rue (1842). Nouveaux essais historiques sur la ville de Caen. Mancel.
- Édouard Frère (1860). "Journaux: Calvados". Manuel du bibliographie normand (in French). Vol. 2. Rouen. p. 113. hdl:2027/hvd.32044093616647.
- Barthelemy Pont (1866). Histoire de la ville de Caen (in French). Alliot.
- Catalogue des manuscrits de la Bibliothèque municipale de Caen (in French). F. Le Blanc-Hardel. 1880.
- "Caen". Normandie. Guides Joanne (in French). Hachette. 1901. hdl:2027/hvd.hn3f4h.
- "Caen". Dictionnaire Bouillet (in French) (34th ed.). Hachette. 1914. hdl:2027/mdp.39015074817142.
- Henri Prentout (1921). Caen et Bayeux. Les villes d'art célèbres (in French). H. Laurens.
- Jean-Jacques Gloton (1957). "Orientation de l'architecture civile à Caen au temps de la Renaissance". Annales de Normandie (in French). 7 (1) – via Persée (web portal).
