= Canton of Hérouville-Saint-Clair =

Coordinates: 49.20°N 0.33°W

Hérouville-Saint-Clair
- Canton
- Interactive map of Hérouville-Saint-Clair
- Country: France
- Region: Normandy
- Department: Calvados
- No. of communes: {{{nbcomm}}}

Government
  - Representatives (2021–2028): Elise Cassetto-Gadrat; Steve Lechangeur
- Area: 17.78 km^{2} (6.86 sq mi)
- Population (2023): 30,713
  - Density: 1,727/km^{2} (4,474/sq mi)
- INSEE code: 14 14

The canton of Hérouville-Saint-Clair is an administrative division of the Calvados department, northwestern France. It was created at the French canton reorganisation which came into effect in March 2015. Its seat is in Hérouville-Saint-Clair.

== Composition ==
It consists of the following communes:

1. Colombelles
2. Hérouville-Saint-Clair

== Councillors ==
Election	Councillors	Party	Occupation
2015	Sylviane Lepoittevin	MoDem	Councillor of Hérouville-Saint-Clair
2015	Rodolphe Thomas	MoDem	Mayor of Hérouville-Saint-Clair
2016	Erwann Bernet	MoDem	Animator in socio-cultural center
2021	Elise Cassetto-Gadrat	DVG	Councillor of Hérouville-Saint-Clair
2021	Steve Lechangeur	DVG	Councillor of Colombelles

- In December 2015, Rodolphe Thomas resigned for accumulation of mandates. He is replaced by his substitute, Erwann Bernet.

== Pictures of the canton ==
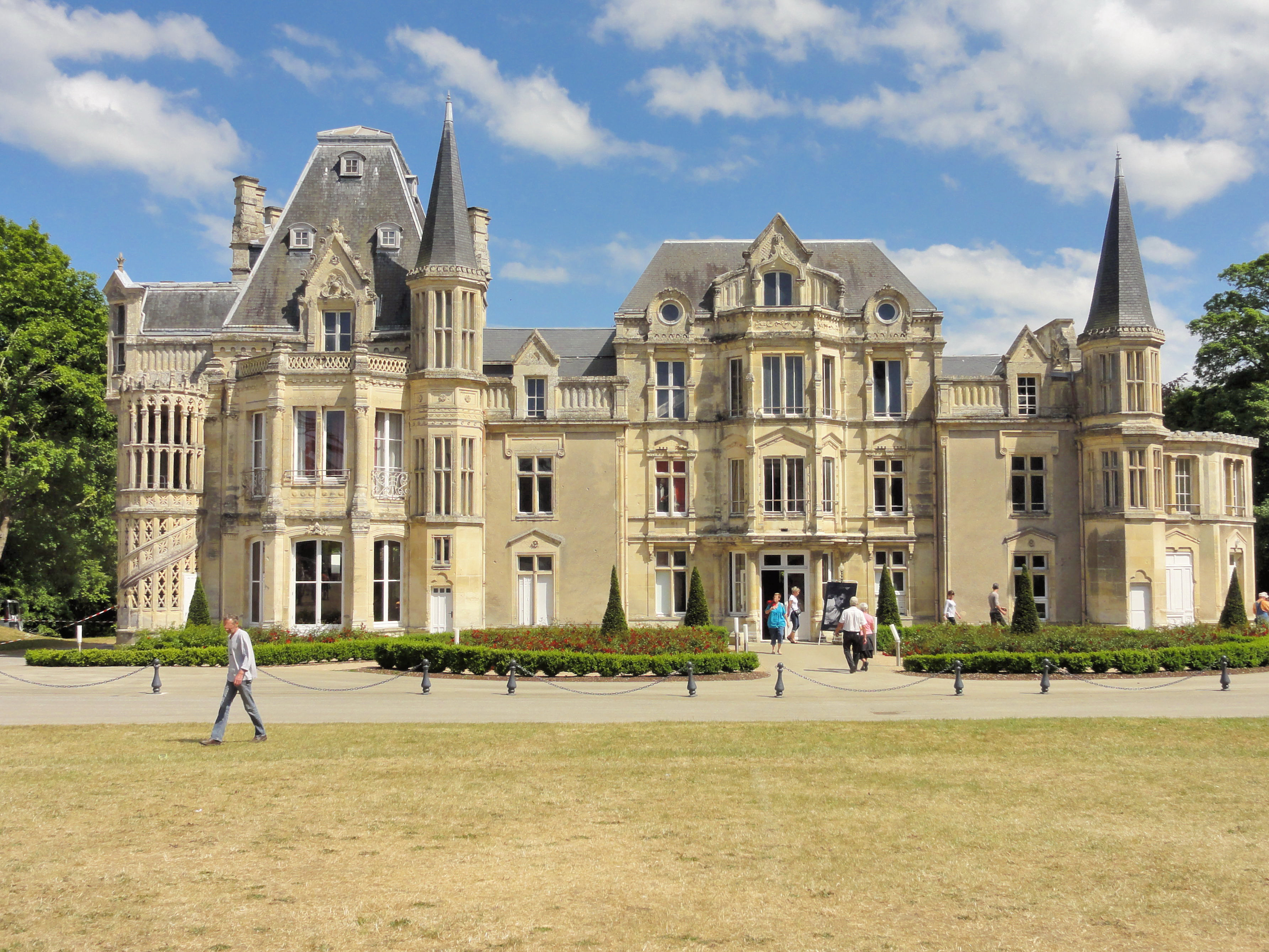
Beauregard castle in Hérouville-Saint-Clair

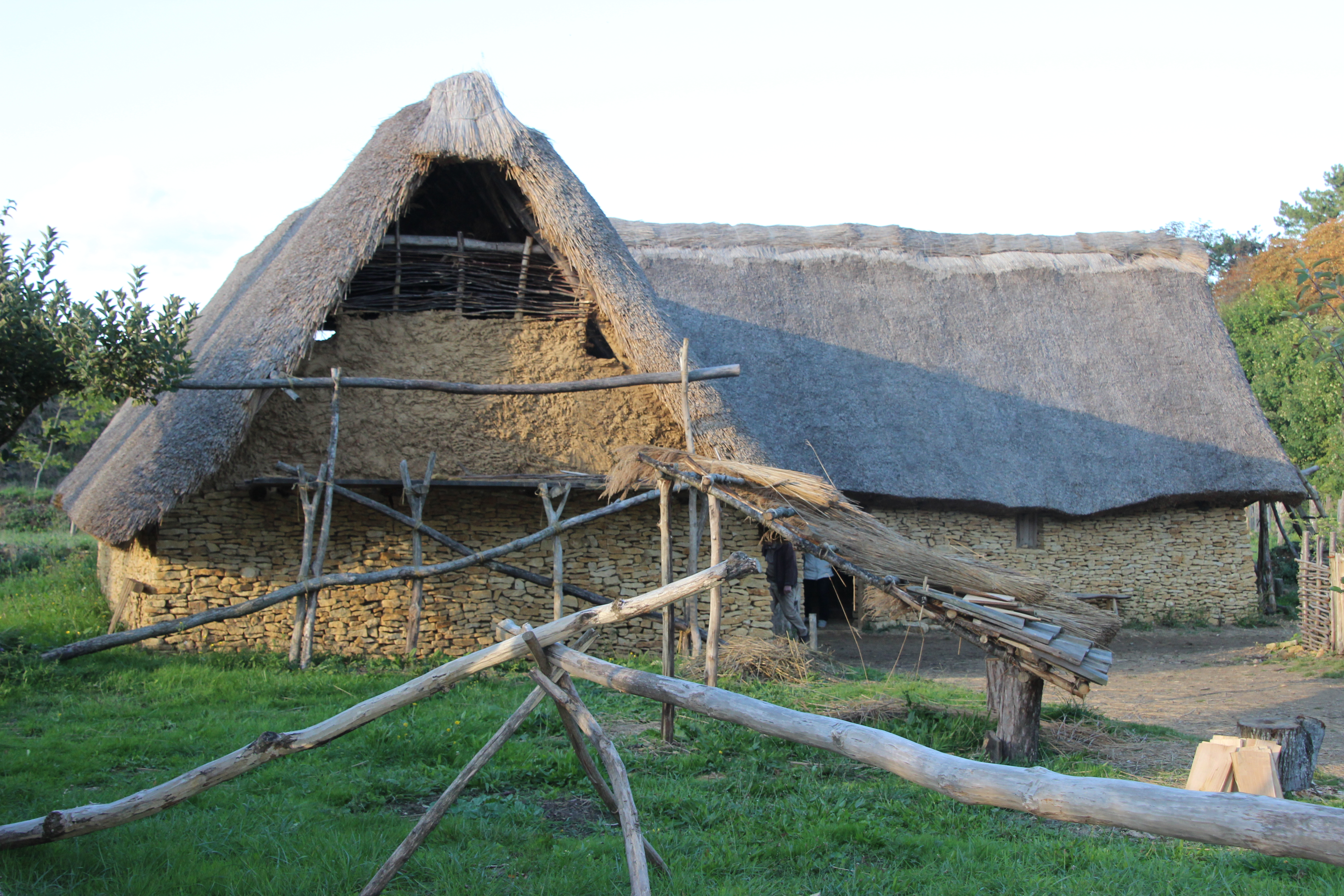
Carolingian Farm at Ornavik Historical Park in Hérouville-Saint-Clair

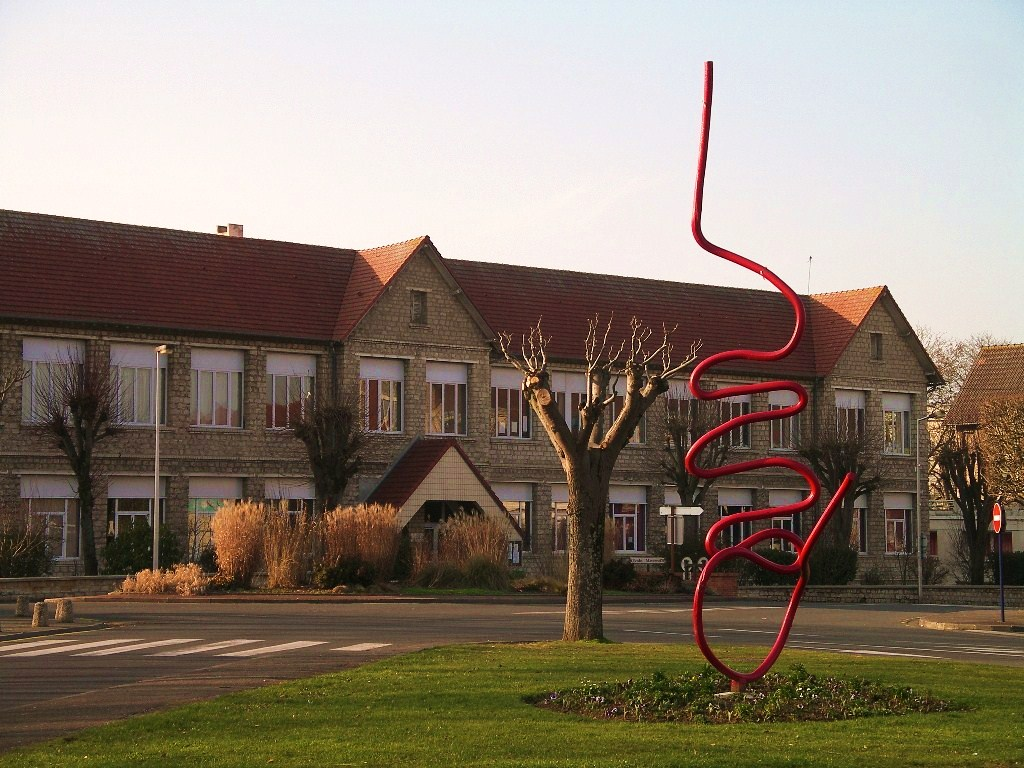
Monument to the last casting of the Société Métallurgique de Normandie
