= Henry Delisle =

French academic and politician (1938–2022)

Member of the National Assembly for Calvados's 2nd constituency
- In office 2 July 1981 – 21 February 1986
- Preceded by: Robert Bisson
- Succeeded by: Louis Mexandeau

Mayor of Mézidon-Canon
- In office 1971–1983

Personal details
- Born: 20 April 1938 Périers, France
- Died: 18 April 2022 (aged 83) Caen, France
- Party: Socialist Party
- Profession: Teacher

Henry Delisle (20 April 1938 – 18 April 2022) was a French academic and politician. He served as Inspector General of Agriculture and served as President of the Institut national de formation des personnels du ministère de l'Agriculture. He served as a Member of Parliament in the National Assembly for Calvados's 2nd constituency from 1981 to 1986. Delisle died in Caen on 18 April 2022 at the age of 83.

== Decorations ==
- Officer of the National Order of the Legion of Honour
- Commander of the Order of Agricultural Merit
- Honorary Knight Commander of the Most Distinguished Order of Saint Michael and Saint George

== Works ==
- Culture rurale, cultures urbaines ?
- Si vous aimez le Parti Socialiste, quittez le !
