= François Digard =

French politician

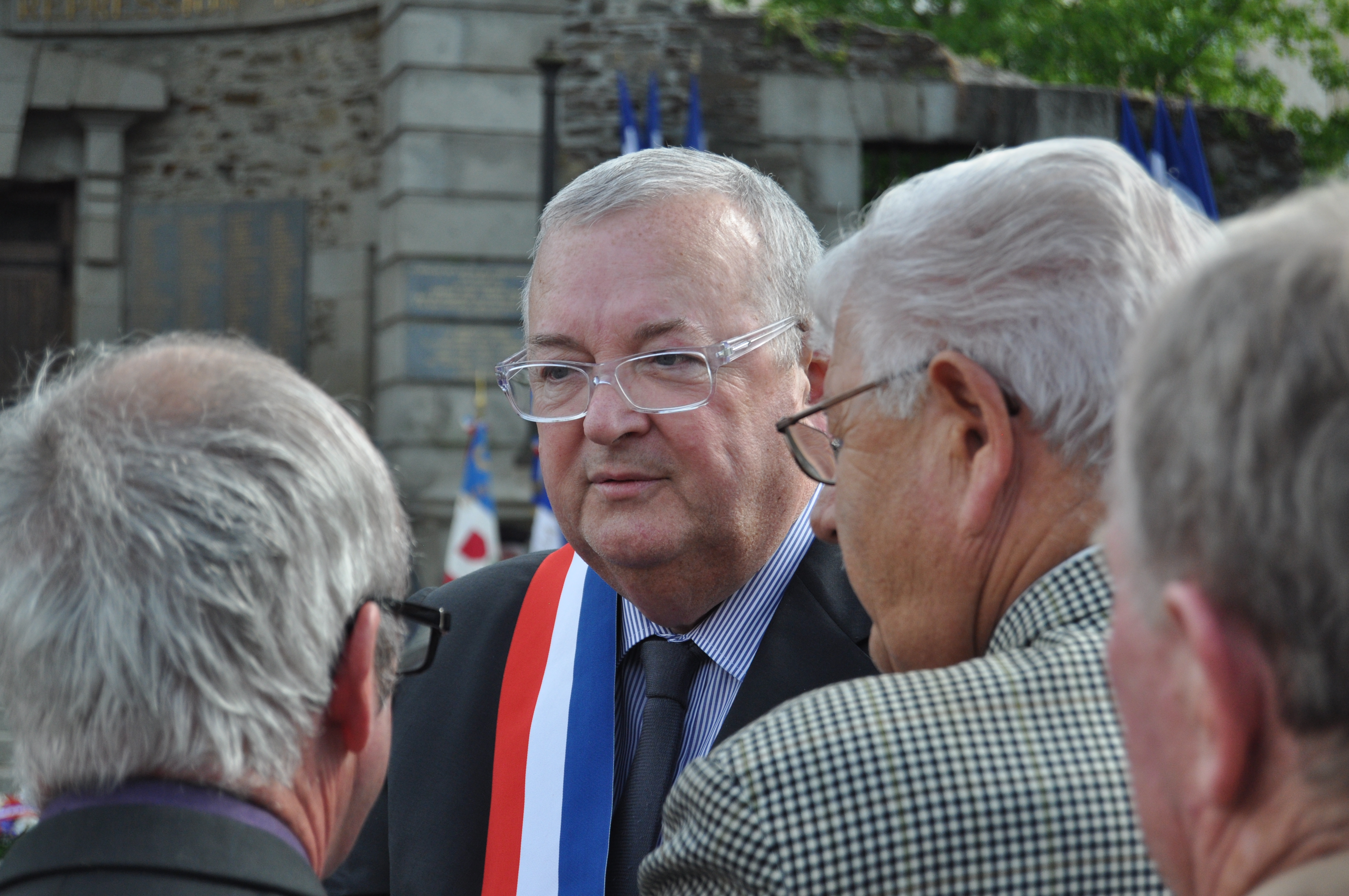
- François Digard in 2013

Mayor of Saint-Lô
- In office 15 June 1995 – 6 April 2014
- Preceded by: Bernard Dupuis
- Succeeded by: François Brière

Member of the Regional Council of Normandy
- In office 16 March 1986 – 13 December 2015
- President: René Garrec; Philippe Duron; Laurent Beauvais

Personal details
- Born: 23 October 1948; Pont-Hébert, France
- Died: 30 July 2017 (aged 68); Caen, France
- Political party: UMP; The Republicans

François Digard (French pronunciation: [fʁɑ̃swa diɡaʁ]; 23 October 1948 – 30 July 2017) was a French politician who served as mayor of Saint-Lô between 1995 and 2014.
