= Hôtel de Ville, Hérouville-Saint-Clair =

Town hall in Hérouville-Saint-Clair, France

Hôtel de Ville
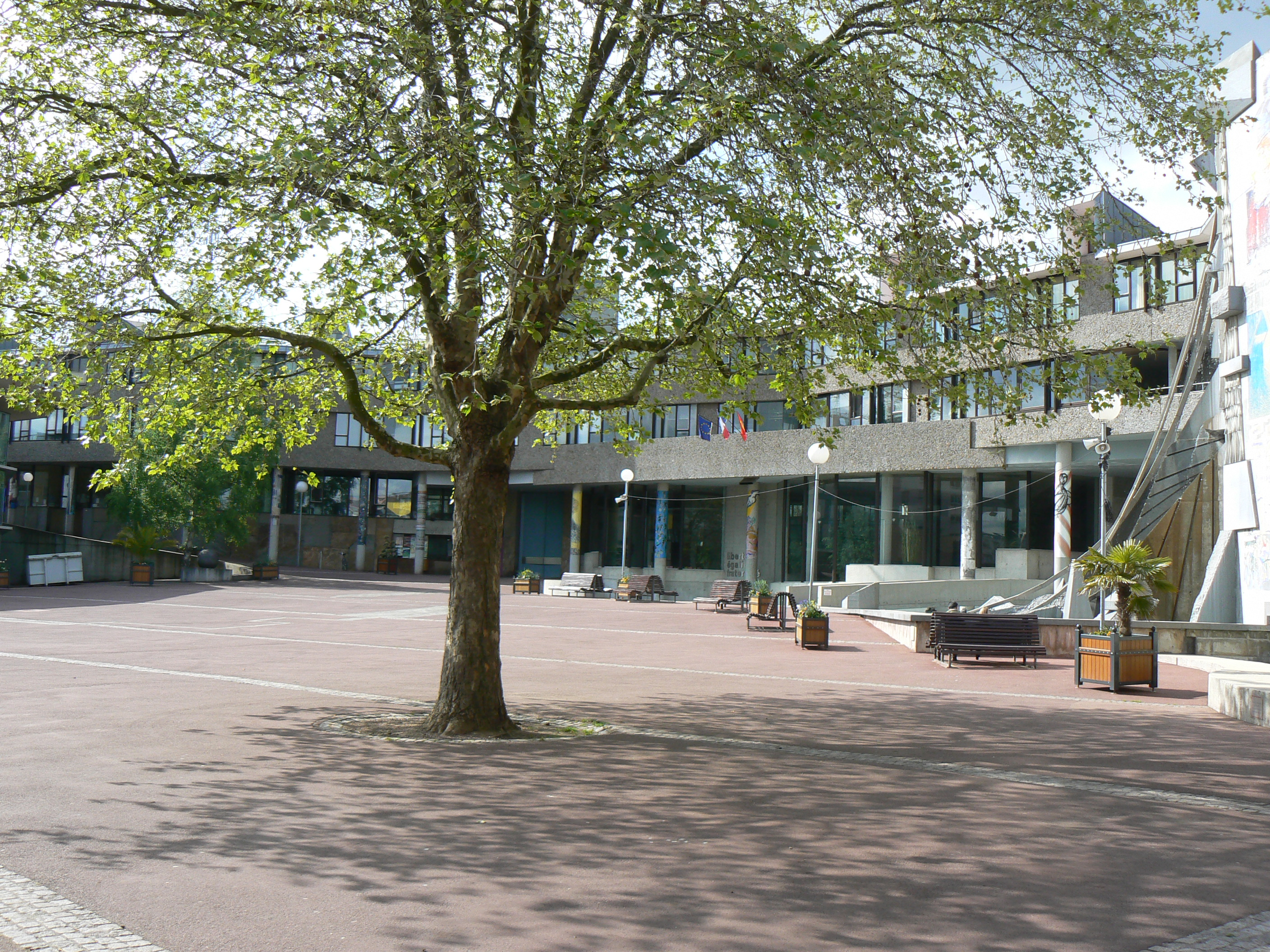
- The main frontage of the Hôtel de Ville in May 2008
- Interactive map of the Hôtel de Ville area

General information
- Type: City hall
- Architectural style: Modern style
- Location: Hérouville-Saint-Clair, France
- Coordinates: 49.2036°N 0.3337°W
- Completed: 1987

Design and construction
- Architect: Eugène Leseney

The Hôtel de Ville (French pronunciation: [otɛl də vil], City Hall) is a municipal building in Hérouville-Saint-Clair, Calvados, in northwestern France, standing on Place François Mitterrand.

== History ==
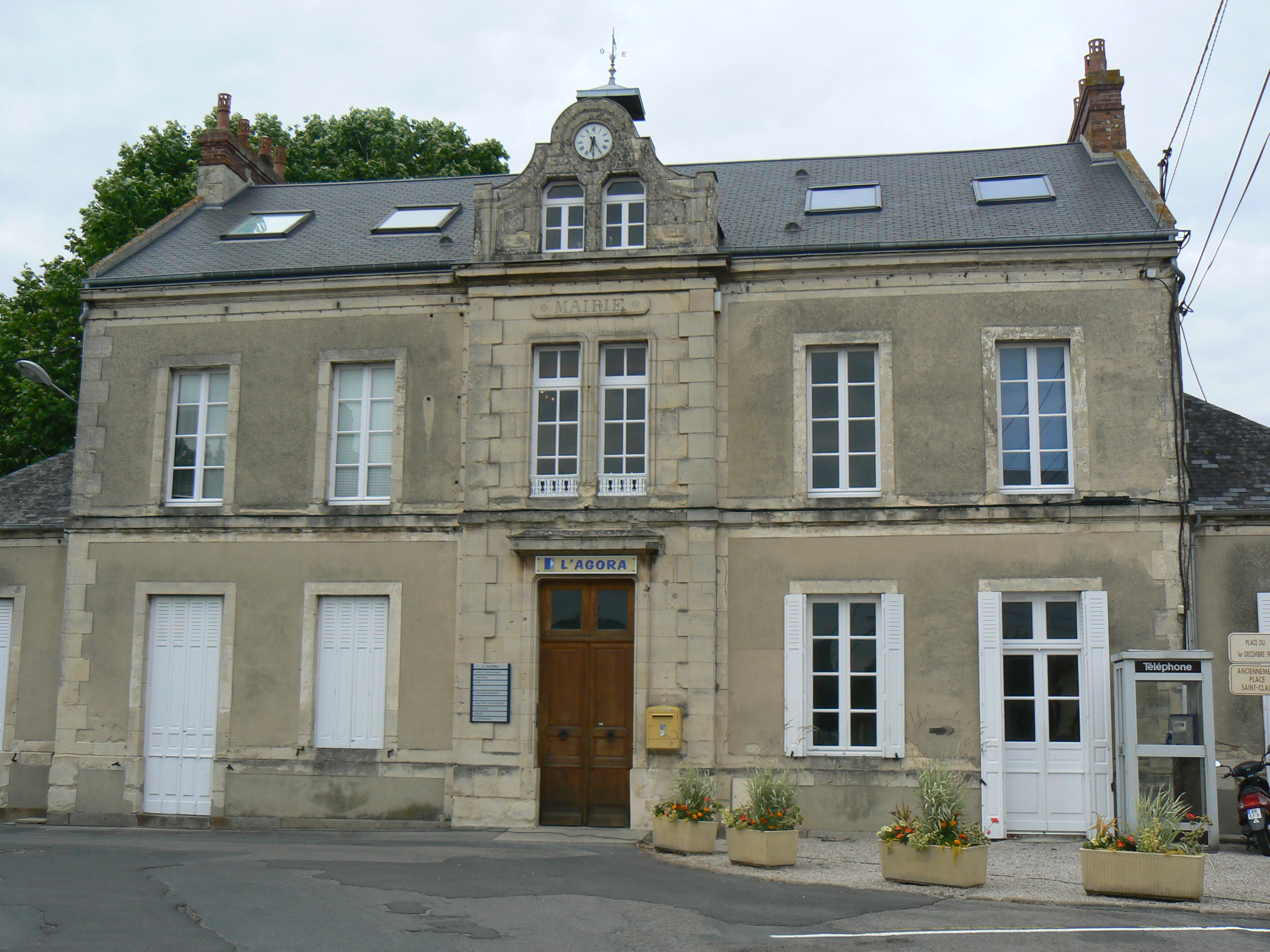
The old town hall

Following the French Revolution, the town council initially met in the house of the mayor at the time. This arrangement continued until the mid-19th century, when the council decided to commission a combined town hall and school. The site they selected, on the north side of the main square (now Place du 1 Décembre 1945), was adjacent to the Church of Saint-Clair and close to the Caen Canal.

The new building was designed in the neoclassical style and built in brick with a cement render finish. The design involved a symmetrical main frontage of five bays facing onto the street. The central bay, which was slightly projected forward, featured a doorway with a cornice on the ground floor, a bi-partite window on the first floor, and a shaped pediment containing a pair of dormer windows and a clock at roof level. Behind the clock, there was a small lantern. There were doorways, which provided access for the schoolchildren, in the outer bays, and there quoins at the corners of the central bay and of the building. The other bays were fenestrated by casement windows with stone surrounds. After the building was no longer required for municipal purposes, it became a community centre known as the Agora, recalling the name of the public space in Greek towns.

In the early 1980s, following significant population growth associated with a priority urbanization area, the council led by the mayor, François Geindre, decided to create a new town centre with a new town hall and cultural centre at its heart. The site they selected was in the centre of the fastest growing part of the town and 20,000 square metres (220,000 sq ft) of land was acquired for the purpose. The complex, which was intended to replicate a medieval square that was protected by fortifications, was named the "Citadelle Douce" (gentle citadel).

The foundation stone for the various buildings making up the complex, including the town hall, was laid by Geindre in June 1984. The complex was designed by Eugène Leseney in the modern style, built in concrete and glass and was officially opened by the president of France, François Mitterrand, and his wife, Danielle Mitterrand, on 22 June 1987.

The design involved a long concrete building, clad in granite and ceramic tiles. The town hall section was distinguished by its greater massing and height and, internally, the principal room was the Salle du Conseil (council chamber) designed in the form of a large cylinder. A fountain, which was named the Voile de la mariée (bridal veil), was installed at the east end of the town hall during construction. The complex was designated a building demonstrating Architecture Contemporaine Remarquable (Remarkable Contemporary Architecture) in 2007.
