= Hérouville-Saint-Clair =

- Commune
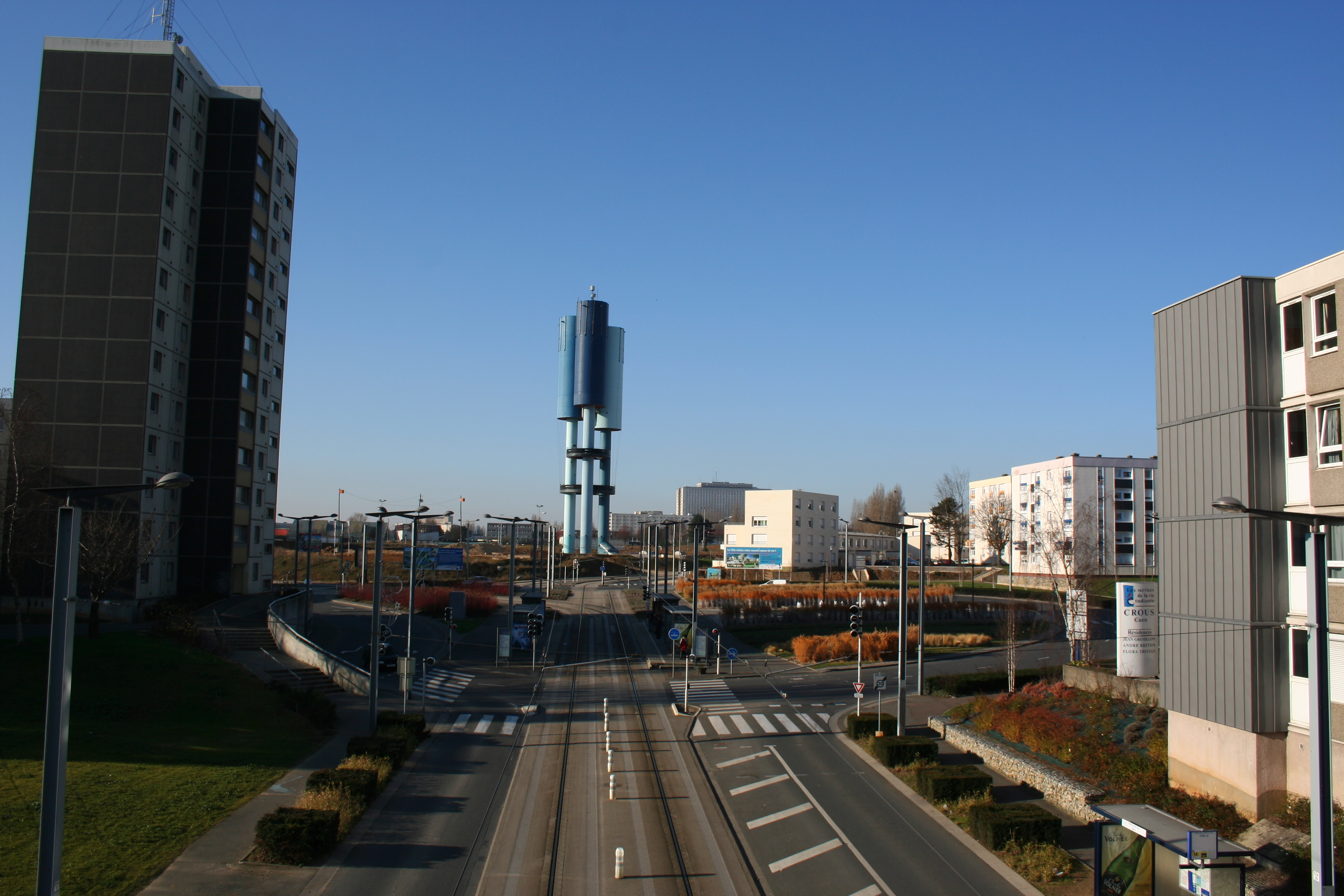
- The Place de la Fontaine seen from the footbridge

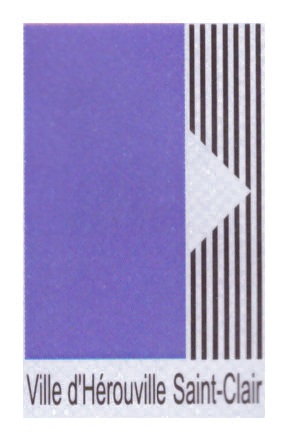
- Coat of arms
- Location of Hérouville-Saint-Clair
- Location within France Location within Normandy
- Coordinates: 49°12′16″N 0°19′31″W
- Country: France
- Region: Normandy
- Department: Calvados
- Arrondissement: Caen
- Canton: Hérouville-Saint-Clair
- Intercommunality: Caen la Mer

Government
  - Mayor (2020–2026): Rodolphe Thomas
- Area^{1}: 10.64 km^{2} (4.11 sq mi)
- Elevation: 34.5 m (113 ft)
- Highest elevation: 70 m (230 ft)
- Lowest elevation: 1 m (3.3 ft)
- Population (2023): 23,470
  - Density: 2,206/km^{2} (5,713/sq mi)
- Time zone: UTC+01:00 (CET)
  - Summer (DST): UTC+02:00 (CEST)
- INSEE/Postal code: 14327 /14200
- ^{1} French Land Register data, which excludes lakes, ponds, glaciers > 1 km^{2} (0.386 sq mi or 247 acres) and river estuaries.

Hérouville-Saint-Clair (French pronunciation: [eʁuvil sɛ̃ klɛːʁ]) is a commune in the Calvados department in the Normandy region in northwestern France.

It is a suburb of the city of Caen, and lies adjacent to it in a northeasterly direction, along the west side of the Canal de Caen à la Mer. Its inhabitants are called Hérouvillais.

Just across the canal from Hérouville is a Renault Trucks manufacturing plant, which is situated between the canal and the river Orne. Just east of the river is the town of Colombelles.

== History ==
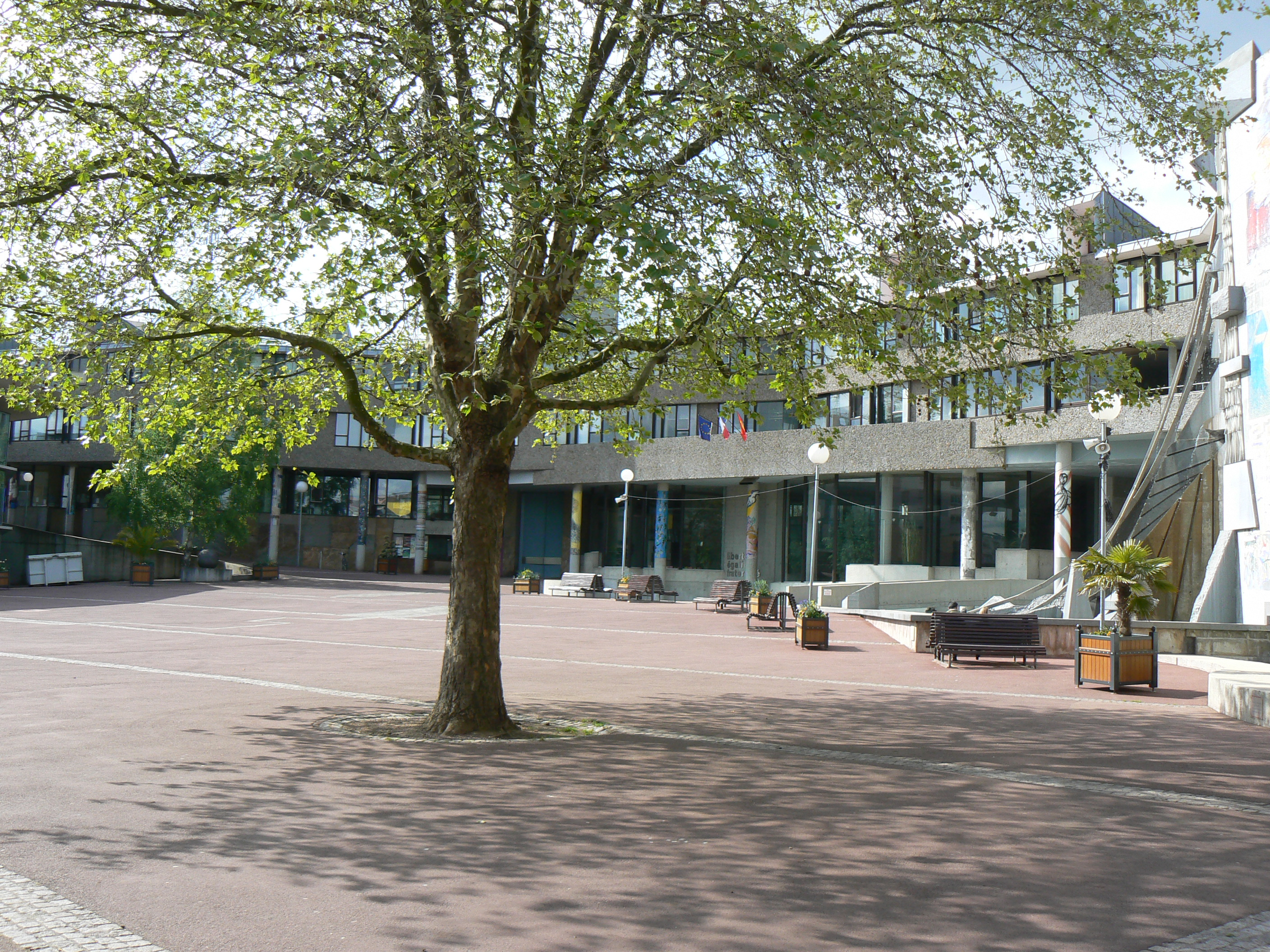
The Hôtel de Ville

Hérouville was the commune name until 1957. The Hôtel de Ville was completed in 1987.

== Population ==
Hérouville-Saint-Clair experienced a very fast development which made it the most populous suburb of Caen. A simple village at the beginning of 1960, the commune passed from fewer than 2,000 inhabitants to almost 25,000 in less than fifteen years. This figure has varied little since 1975.

Historical population

Year	Pop.	±% p.a.
1793	553	—
1800	465	−2.45%
1806	560	+3.15%
1821	621	+0.69%
1831	591	−0.49%
1836	636	+1.48%
1841	662	+0.80%
1846	618	−1.37%
1851	569	−1.64%
1856	630	+2.06%
1861	559	−2.36%
1866	591	+1.12%
1872	596	+0.14%
1876	595	−0.04%
1881	511	−3.00%
1886	560	+1.85%
1891	630	+2.38%
1896	608	−0.71%
1901	658	+1.59%

Year	Pop.	±% p.a.
1906	629	−0.90%
1911	563	−2.19%
1921	672	+1.79%
1926	864	+5.15%
1931	939	+1.68%
1936	896	−0.93%
1946	957	+0.66%
1954	1,358	+4.47%
1962	1,784	+3.47%
1968	9,041	+31.06%
1975	23,712	+14.77%
1982	24,298	+0.35%
1990	24,795	+0.25%
1999	24,025	−0.35%
2007	22,590	−0.77%
2012	21,411	−1.07%
2017	22,954	+1.40%
2023	23,470	+0.37%

Source: EHESS and INSEE (1968-2023)

== Sport ==
The commune has a football club SC Hérouville who have competed in the Championnat National 2.

== See also ==
- Communes of the Calvados department
