= Calvados's 2nd constituency =

Constituency of the National Assembly of France

2nd constituency of Calvados
- inline Constituency of the National Assembly of France

- Constituency in Department

- Calvados in France
- Deputy: Arthur Delaporte; PS
- Department: Calvados
- Cantons: Caen-4, Caen-5, Caen-6, Caen-7, Caen-10, Troarn
- Registered voters: 107,691

The 2nd constituency of Calvados is a French legislative constituency in the Calvados department, covering the east of Caen, the department's prefecture. Like the other 576 French constituencies, it elects one MP using the two-round system, with a run-off if no candidate receives over 50% of the vote in the first round.

== Deputies ==
Election	Member	Party	Notes
1958	Robert Bisson	UNR	
1962	Robert Bisson	UNR	
1967	Robert Bisson	UDR	
1968	Robert Bisson	UDR	
1973	Robert Bisson	UDR	
1978	Robert Bisson	RPR	
1981	Henry Delisle	PS	
1986	Proportional representation - no election by constituency		
1988	Louis Mexandeau	PS	
1991	Dominique Robert	PS	Substitute for Louis Mexandeau
1993	Louis Mexandeau	PS	
1997	Louis Mexandeau	PS	
2002	Rodolphe Thomas	UDF	
2007	Laurence Dumont	PS	
2012	Laurence Dumont	PS	
2017	Laurence Dumont	PS	
2022	Arthur Delaporte	PS	
2024	Arthur Delaporte	PS	

== Election results ==
=== 2024 ===
Candidate	Party	Alliance	First round		Second round	
Candidate	Party	Alliance	Votes	%	Votes	%
Arthur Delaporte	PS	NFP	19,662	42.34	29,761	68.28
Josseline Liban	RN		11,999	25.84	13,823	31.72
Camille Brou	LR		7,159	15.42		
Grégory Berkovicaz	REN	Ensemble	6,503	14.00		
Cédric Bazincourt	DLF		566	1.22		
Christophe Garcia	LO		547	1.18		
Valid votes			46,436	97.89	43,584	92.68
Blank votes			626	1.32	2,387	5308
Null votes			376	0.79	1,053	2.24
Turnout			47,438	68.74	47,024	68.12
Abstentions			21,574	31.26	22,005	31.88
Registered voters			69,012		69,029	
Result			PS HOLD			

=== 2022 ===
Legislative Election 2022: Calvados's 2nd constituency
Party	Candidate	Votes	%	±%
PS (NUPÉS)	Arthur Delaporte	14,040	42.01	+1.99
MoDem (Ensemble)	Sylvie Dumont Prieux	8,138	24.35	-9.96
RN	Céline Deslandes	5,091	15.23	+5.25
LR (UDC)	Camille Brou	2,449	7.33	−2.60
REC	Esteline Caillemer	886	2.65	N/A
DVC	Virginie Cronier	813	2.43	N/A
Others	N/A	2,003	5.99	
Turnout		33,420	49.67	−0.93
2nd round result
PS (NUPÉS)	Arthur Delaporte	18,963	59.86	+6.54
MoDem (Ensemble)	Sylvie Dumont Prieux	12,716	40.14	−6.54
Turnout		31,679	48.86	+4.49
PS hold				

=== 2017 ===
Candidate	Label	First round		Second round	
Candidate	Label	Votes	%	Votes	%
Éric Halphen	LREM	11,522	34.31	12,968	46.68
Laurence Dumont	PS	6,842	20.37	14,814	53.32
Étienne Brasselet	FI	4,069	12.12		
Sabrina Joret	FN	3,351	9.98		
Aminthe Renouf	LR	3,335	9.93		
Noëlle Le Maulf	ECO	1,269	3.78		
Gérard Leneveu	PCF	1,261	3.75		
Jérôme Hommais	ECO	632	1.88		
Christine Bonnissent	DLF	386	1.15		
Christophe Garcia	EXG	253	0.75		
Samuel Mouity	DIV	173	0.52		
Mohamed Bouabdallaoui	DIV	141	0.42		
Cedric Evano	DVG	85	0.25		
Didier Bergar	EXG	81	0.24		
Romain Coutant	DIV	77	0.23		
Mustafa Yilmaz	DIV	62	0.18		
Thibault Vétillard	DVG	46	0.14		
Votes		33,585	100.00	27,782	100.00
Valid votes		33,585	98.19	27,782	92.64
Blank votes		426	1.25	1,486	4.96
Null votes		192	0.56	720	2.40
Turnout		34,203	50.60	29,988	44.37
Abstentions		33,389	49.40	37,603	55.63
Registered voters		67,592		67,591	
Source: Ministry of the Interior

=== 2012 ===
Summary of the 10 June and 17 June 2012 French legislative election in Calvados’ 2nd Constituency
Candidate	Party		1st round		2nd round	
Candidate	Party		Votes	%	Votes	%
Laurence Dumont	Socialist Party	PS	17,837	45.97%	22,880	62.49%
Rodolphe Thomas	Democratic Movement	MoDem	8,013	20.65%	13,734	37.51%
Amandine Francois	Union for a Popular Movement	UMP	4,650	11.98%		
Christophe Mal	Front National	FN	3,239	8.35%		
Gérard Leneveu	Left Front	FG	2,952	7.61%		
Caroline Amiel	Europe Ecology – The Greens	EELV	1,276	3.29%		
Christophe Sady	Ecologist	ECO	174	0.45%		
Driss Anhichem	Miscellaneous Left	DVG	172	0.44%		
Florine Le Bris	Far Left	EXG	165	0.43%		
Christophe Garcia	Far Left	EXG	130	0.34%		
Jacqueline Tancelin-Goueslard	Far Left	EXG	98	0.25%		
Jean Paul Ducandas	Far Left	EXG	71	0.18%		
Eric Le Denmat		CEN	28	0.07%		
Total			38,805	100%	36,614	100%
Registered voters			67,111		67,110	
Blank/Void ballots			395	1.01%	1,071	2.84%
Turnout			39,200	58.41%	37,685	56.15%
Abstentions			27,911	41.59%	29,425	43.85%
Result					PS HOLD	

=== 2007 ===
Summary of the 10 June and 17 June 2007 French legislative election in Calvados’ 2nd Constituency
Candidate	Party		1st round		2nd round	
Candidate	Party		Votes	%	Votes	%
Laurence Dumont	Socialist Party	PS	14,706	37.68%	22,403	54.62%
Rodolphe Thomas	Democratic Movement	MoDem	14,804	37.94%	18,616	45.38%
Alain Gruenais	The Greens	VEC	1,844	4.73%		
Gérard Leneveu	Communist	PCF	1,796	4.60%		
Henri Ferey	Front National	FN	1,095	2.81%		
Cynthia Colosio	Far Left	EXG	968	2.48%		
Bernard Crouzille	Miscellaneous Right	DVD	866	2.22%		
Sophie Noel	Movement for France	MPF	718	1.84%		
Hélène Kunkel	Hunting, Fishing, Nature, Traditions	CPNT	674	1.73%		
Christophe Sady	Ecologist	ECO	391	1.00%		
Eric Le Denmat	Independent	DIV	369	0.95%		
Christophe Garcia	Far Left	EXG	361	0.93%		
Rémi Aillaud	Far Left	EXG	298	0.76%		
Eric Delteil	Far Left	EXG	134	0.34%		
Total			39,024	100%	41,019	100%
Registered voters			67,480		67,478	
Blank/Void ballots			747	1.88%	799	1.91%
Turnout			39,771	58.94%	41,818	61.97%
Abstentions			27,709	41.06%	25,660	38.03%
Result					PS GAIN FROM UDF	

=== 2002 ===
Legislative Election 2002: Calvados's 2nd constituency
Party	Candidate	Votes	%	±%
UDF	Rodolphe Thomas	13,156	33.84	
PS	Louis Mexandeau	12,325	31.70	
FN	Eric Pinel	2,554	6.57	
LV	Alain Gruenais	1,998	5.14	
PCF	Gérard Leneveu	1,745	4.49	
EXG	Patrick Arz	1,502	3.86	
CPNT	Marie-Christine Desloges	1,036	2.66	
Others	N/A	4,564		
Turnout		39,690	61.26	
2nd round result
UDF	Rodolphe Thomas	18,903	51.07	
PS	Louis Mexandeau	18,112	48.93	
Turnout		38,633	59.63	
UDF gain from PS				

=== 1997 ===
Legislative Election 1997: Calvados's 2nd constituency
Party	Candidate	Votes	%	±%
PS	Louis Mexandeau	13,802	35.32	
RPR	Brigitte Le Brethon	9,423	24.12	
PCF	Marc Bellet	4,545	11.63	
FN	Jean-Luc Bigot	4,029	10.31	
LV	Alain Gruenais	2,246	5.75	
MPF	Paul Mercier	1,096	2.81	
LCR	Nicolas Benies	978	2.50	
GE	Karima Zahir	901	2.31	
Others	N/A	2,053		
Turnout		40,836	65.14	
2nd round result
PS	Louis Mexandeau	25,674	62.67	
RPR	Brigitte Le Brethon	15,294	37.33	
Turnout		43,248	69.01	
PS gain from RPR				

== Sources ==
- *"Résultats électoraux officiels en France" (in French). 2012.
- "Résultats électoraux officiels en France" (in French). 2007.
- "Résultats électoraux officiels en France" (in French). 2002.
