= Robert Bisson =

Robert Bisson may refer to:

- Robert O. Bisson (1908–1959), United States Marine Corps general
- Robert Bisson (politician) (1909–2004), French politician
