= Fabrice Le Vigoureux =

French politician

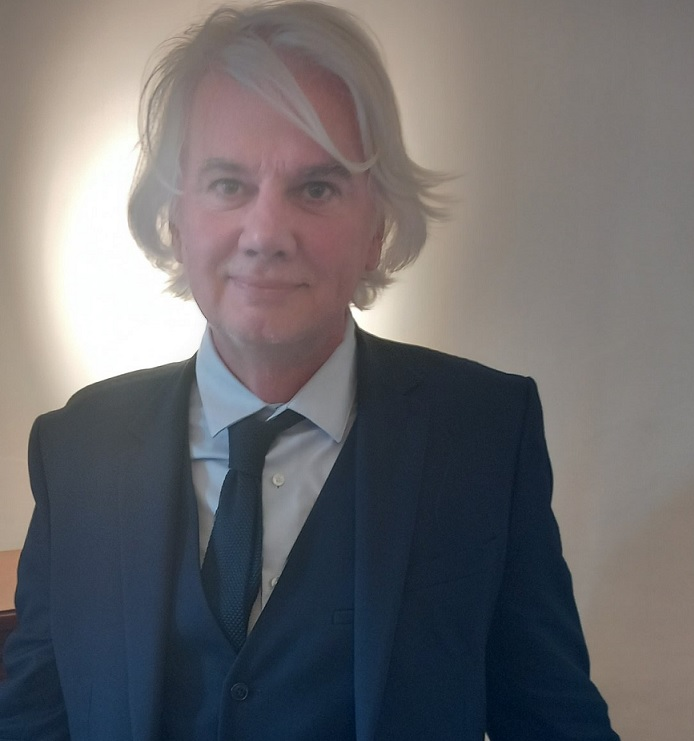

Member of the National Assembly for Calvados's 1st constituency
- In office 21 June 2017 – 9 June 2024
- Preceded by: Philippe Duron
- Succeeded by: Joël Bruneau

Personal details
- Born: 27 August 1969 (age 55); Caen, France
- Political party: Renaissance
- Education: Lycée Malherbe
- Alma mater: University of Caen

Fabrice Le Vigoureux (born 27 August 1969) is a French politician and member of Renaissance. In June 2017, he was elected to serve as Deputy for the 1st constituency of Calvados in the French National Assembly. He was reelected for a second term at the 2022 French legislative election. He stood down at the 2024 election.

== See also ==
- 2017 French legislative election
- 2022 French legislative election
