= Arthur Delaporte =

French politician (born 1991)

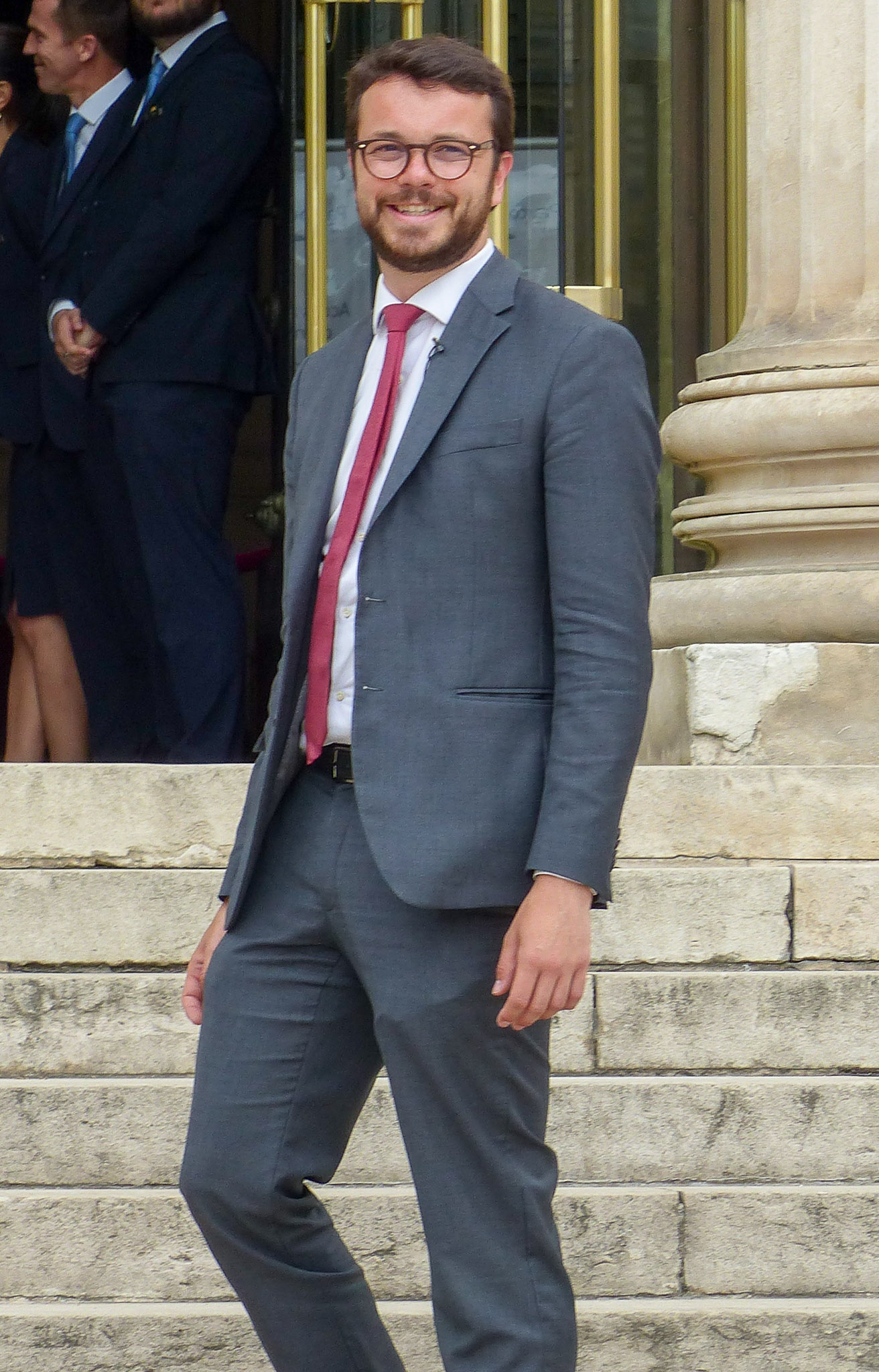
- Arthur Delaporte in 2024

Member of the National Assembly for Calvados's 2nd constituency
- Incumbent
- Assumed office 22 June 2022
- Preceded by: Laurence Dumont

Personal details
- Born: 7 October 1991 (age 34) Caen, France
- Party: Socialist Party
- Other political affiliations: NUPES (2022–2024); New Popular Front (since 2024)
- Education: Lycée Henri-IV
- Alma mater: École Normale Supérieure de Lyon; Sciences Po; University of Paris 1 Panthéon-Sorbonne
- Profession: Historian, teacher

Arthur Delaporte (born 7 October 1991) is a French politician of the Socialist Party. He has been serving as a Member of Parliament for Calvados's 2nd constituency since the 2022 French legislative election. He was reelected in the 2024 French legislative election.

Arthur Delaporte comes from a family of teachers. All four of his grandparents practiced this profession, as did his parents, and as do his brother and his sister. According to Delaporte, the whole family is "socialist and environmentalist". He grew up in Caen in Normandy and, after graduating from high school, attended the prestigious preparatory classes at the Lycée Henri-IV in Paris, where he lived in boarding school. He then passed the entrance exams for Sciences Po in Paris and École normale supérieure de Lyon. Delaporte completed a Licence (bachelor's degree) in history (Lyon) and a master's degree in public affairs (Sciences Po) and passed the Agrégation (state examination for highly qualified secondary school teachers with lifetime tenure) in history in 2016. While pursuing his doctoral studies in political science under Frédéric Sawicki, he taught as an adjunct lecturer at the Université Paris 1 Panthéon-Sorbonne from 2017 to 2020 and as a temporary teaching and research assistant at the same university until 2022. At the time of his election to parliament, he had not yet completed his doctorate.

Nominated by the Socialist Party and endorsed by the left-wing New Ecological and Social People's Union (NUPES) alliance, Delaporte won the seat in the 2nd constituency of the department of Calvados (Normandy region) in the 2022 French legislative election with almost 60 percent of the votes in the runoff election. In 2023, Delaporte publicly endorsed the re-election of the Socialist Party's chairman Olivier Faure. In the 2024 snap election, Delaporte won the runoff election in his constituency against the candidate of the far-right National Rally (RN) with 68 percent of the vote.
