= Louis Mexandeau =

French politician (1931–2023)

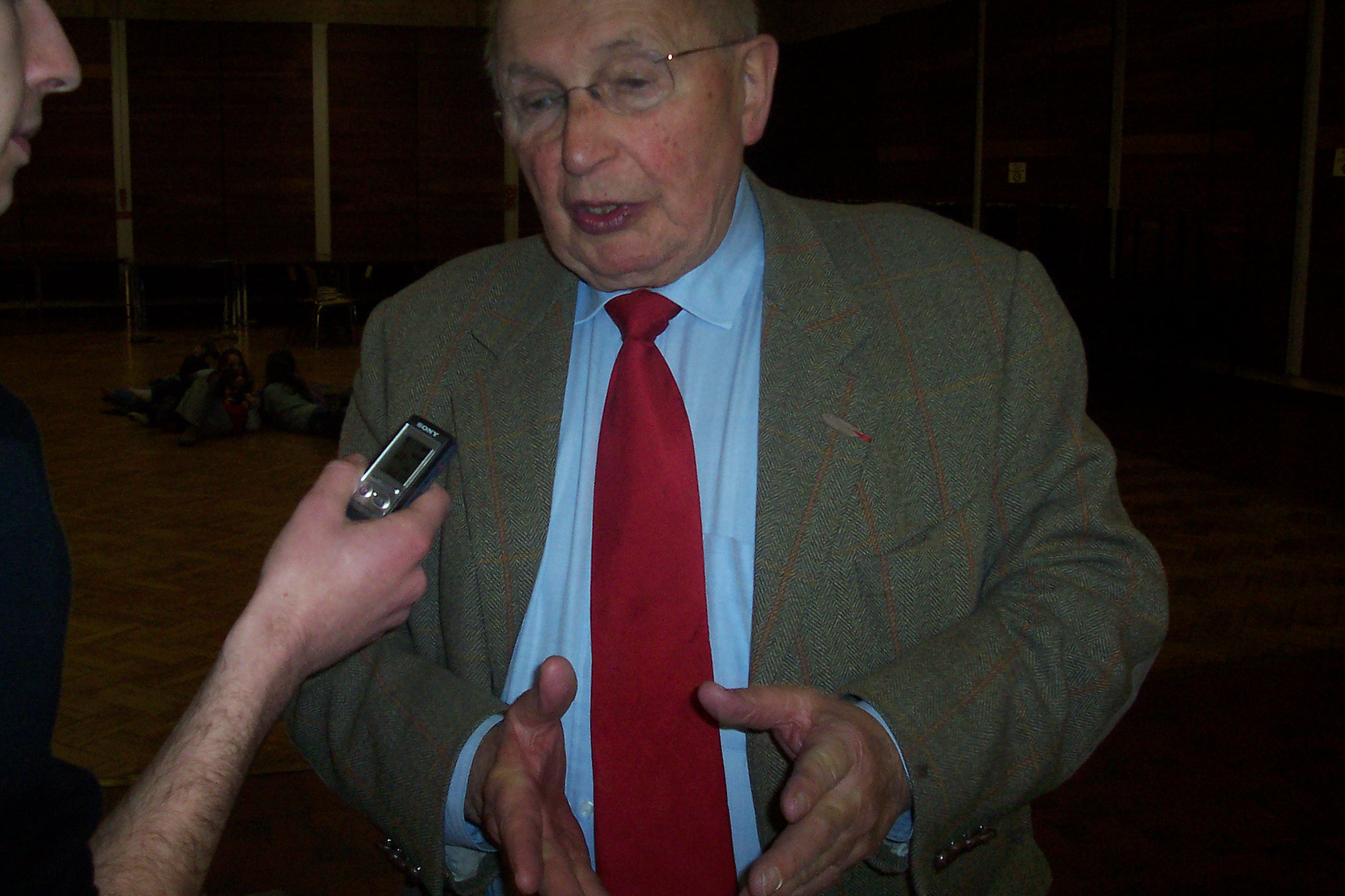
- Mexandeau in 2008

Member of the National Assembly for Calvados's 2nd constituency
- In office 2 April 1993 – 18 June 2002
- Preceded by: Dominique Robert
- Succeeded by: Rodolphe Thomas

Member of the National Assembly for Calvados's 1st constituency
- In office 2 April 1973 – 24 July 1981
- Preceded by: Henri Buot
- Succeeded by: Éliane Provost

Minister of Posts
- In office 22 May 1981 – 20 March 1986
- President: François Mitterrand
- Prime Minister: Pierre Mauroy; Laurent Fabius
- Preceded by: Pierre Ribes
- Succeeded by: Alain Madelin

Secretary of State for Veterans' affairs
- In office 17 May 1991 – 29 March 1993
- President: François Mitterrand
- Prime Minister: Édith Cresson; Pierre Bérégovoy
- Preceded by: André Méric
- Succeeded by: Philippe Mestre

Personal details
- Born: Louis Jean Mexandeau; 6 July 1931 Wanquetin, Pas-de-Calais, France
- Died: 14 August 2023 (aged 92) Rennaz, Vaud, Switzerland
- Party: Socialist Party
- Profession: Teacher

Louis Mexandeau (6 July 1931 – 14 August 2023) was a French politician. He served as Minister of the Postal Services from 1981 to 1986 under President François Mitterrand, and as Secretary for Veteran Affairs from 1991 to 1993.

== Biography ==
Louis Mexandeau was born on 6 July 1931 in Wanquetin, France. He received the agrégation, and started his career as a teacher. He was a Socialist member of the National Assembly of France from 1973 to 1981, 1986 to 1991, and 1993 to 2002. He was also Minister of the Postal Services from 1981 to 1986, and Secretary of State for Veteran Affairs from 1991 to 1993. He ran for mayor of Caen five times and lost.

Mexandeau died in Rennaz, Switzerland in 14 August 2023, at the age of 92.

== Bibliography ==
- Nous, nous ne verrons pas la fin : Un enfant dans la guerre, 1939-1945 (2003)
- Histoire du parti socialiste (1905-2005) (2005)
- François Mitterrand, le militant : Trente années de complicité (2006)
- Histoire de France (2011)

Political offices
| Preceded by André Méric | Secretary of State for Veterans and War Victims; 1991–1993 | Succeeded by Philippe Mestre |
