= Calvados's 1st constituency =

Constituency of the National Assembly of France

1st constituency of Calvados
- inline Constituency of the National Assembly of France

- Constituency in Department

- Calvados in France
- Deputy: Fabrice Le Vigoureux; RE
- Department: Calvados
- Cantons: Caen-1, Caen-2, Caen-3, Caen-8, Caen-9, Tilly-sur-Seulles

The 1st constituency of Calvados is a French legislative constituency in the Calvados département. Like the other 576 French constituencies, it elects one MP using the two-round system, with a run-off if no candidate receives over 50% of the vote in the first round.

== Boundaries ==
The constituency includes the western suburbs and districts of the city of Caen.

== Deputies ==
Election	Member	Party
1958	Henri Buot	MRP
1962	Henri Buot	UNR
1967	Henri Buot	UDR
1968	Henri Buot	UDR
1973	Louis Mexandeau	PS
1978	Louis Mexandeau	PS
1981	Louis Mexandeau	PS
1986	Proportional representation - no election by constituency	
1988	Francis Saint-Ellier	UDF
1993	Francis Saint-Ellier	UDF
1997	Philippe Duron	PS
2002	Brigitte Le Brethon	UMP
2007	Philippe Duron	PS
2012	Philippe Duron	PS
2017	Fabrice Le Vigoureux	LREM
2022	Fabrice Le Vigoureux	RE
2024	Joël Bruneau	DVD

== Election results ==
=== 2024 ===
Candidate	Party	Alliance	First round		Second round	
Candidate	Party	Alliance	Votes	%	Votes	%
Joël Bruneau	DVD		22,596	43.11	28,691	59.87
Emma Fourreau	LFI	NFP	18,250	34.82	19,229	40.31
Ludivine Daoudi	RN		10,458	19.95		
Matéo Leloup	REC		604	1.15		
Pierre Casevitz	LO		510	0.97		
Valid votes			52,418	98.02	47,920	93.93
Blank votes			663	1.24	2,342	4.59
Null votes			397	0.74	756	1.48
Turnout			53,478	72.96	51,018	69.61
Abstentions			19,818	27.04	22,274	30.39
Registered voters			73,296		73,292	
Result			DVD GAIN OVER RE			

=== 2022 ===
Legislative Election 2022: Calvados's 1st constituency
Party	Candidate	Votes	%	±%
LFI (NUPÉS)	Emma Fourreau	13,622	35.81	+6.55
LREM (Ensemble)	Fabrice Le Vigoureux	11,507	30.25	-8.36
LC (UDC)	Sophie Simonnet	5,275	13.87	−2.89
RN	Josseline Liban	4,048	10.64	+3.16
REC	Anne-Laure Chahine	1,105	2.90	N/A
Others	N/A	2,484	6.53	
Turnout		38,041	53.34	−0.10
2nd round result
LREM (Ensemble)	Fabrice Le Vigoureux	18,496	50.27	-14.66
LFI (NUPÉS)	Emma Fourreau	18,296	49.73	N/A
Turnout		36,792	53.61	+9.87
LREM hold				

=== 2017 ===
Candidate	Label	First round		Second round	
Candidate	Label	Votes	%	Votes	%
Fabrice Le Vigoureux	LREM	14,196	38.61	17,340	64.93
Sonia de La Provôté	UDI	6,163	16.76	9,367	35.07
Karinne Gualbert	FI	4,467	12.15		
Éric Vève	PS	3,140	8.54		
Chantal Henry	FN	2,752	7.48		
Rudy L'Orphelin	ECO	2,203	5.99		
Marc Lecerf	DVG	1,246	3.39		
Marie-Jeanne Gobert	PCF	949	2.58		
Annie Pelluet	DLF	386	1.05		
Jean-Michel Sady	ECO	308	0.84		
Nicolas Vabre	EXG	281	0.76		
Pierre Casevitz	EXG	238	0.65		
Patricia Divaret	DIV	164	0.45		
Dimitri Bruyneel	DVD	147	0.40		
Michel Lemonnier	DVG	63	0.17		
Pauline Étroit	DVG	44	0.12		
Hélène Courtois	DVG	25	0.07		
Votes		36,772	100.00	26,707	100.00
Valid votes		36,772	98.15	26,707	87.10
Blank votes		401	1.07	2,895	9.44
Null votes		293	0.78	1,062	3.46
Turnout		37,466	53.44	30,664	43.74
Abstentions		32,641	46.56	39,435	56.26
Registered voters		70,107		70,099	
Source: Ministry of the Interior

=== 2012 ===
Legislative Election 2012: Calvados' 1st constituency - 1st round
Party	Candidate	Votes	%	±%
PS	Philippe Duron	16,200	39.6	+3.0
UMP	Joël Bruneau	11,199	27.4	−14.0
DVD	Philippe Lailler	4,140	10.1	+10.1
FN	Sabine De Villeroche	3,146	7.7	+5.6
FG	Béatrice Dupont	3,040	7.4	+7.4
EELV	Rudy L'orphelin	2,595	6.4	+6.4
EXG	Marie-Pierre Hulbert	243	0.6	+0.6
EXG	Pierre Casevitz	210	0.5	−
EXG	Didier Bergar	107	0.3	+0.3
DVD	Michel Decollogne	1	0.0	+0.0
Turnout		41,383	59.0	−2.4

2nd round
Party	Candidate	Votes	%	±%
PS	Philippe Duron	22,511	56.9	+2.7
UMP	Joël Bruneau	17,026	43.1	−2.7
Majority		5,485	13.4	+4.8
Turnout		40,932	58.3	−6.3
PS hold		Swing		

=== 2007 ===
Legislative Election 2007: Calvados' 1st constituency - 1st round
Party	Candidate	Votes	%	±%
UMP	Brigitte Le Brethon	17,797	41.4	−1.5
PS	Philippe Duron	15,736	36.6	−
MoDem	Martine Fremont	2,121	4.9	+4.9
LV	Annie Anne	1,462	3.4	+3.4
FN	Christian Galoy	920	2.1	−3.6
PCF	Marie-Jeanne Gobert	813	1.9	−0.2
Far Left	Michel Moisan	773	1.8	+1.8
MPF	Hervé Du Boullay	600	1.4	+0.3
DVG	Jérémy Folly	553	1.3	+1.3
Far Left	Etienne Adam	488	1.1	−2.0
DIV	Carole Hersent-Lechatreux	394	0.9	+0.9
CPNT	Martine Pol	386	0.9	−0.8
DVE	Jean-Michel Sady	245	0.6	+0.6
DIV	Yves Aubry	238	0.6	+0.6
Far Left	Pierre Casevitz	209	0.5	+0.5
DVD	Sylvain Victor	169	0.4	+0.4
Far Left	Pierre Marchand	74	0.2	+0.2
DIV	Guy Guerrin	50	0.1	+0.1
Turnout		43,596	61.4	−1.2

2nd round
Party	Candidate	Votes	%	±%
PS	Philippe Duron	24,336	54.2	+4.3
UMP	Brigitte Le Brethon	20,589	45.8	−4.3
Majority		3,747	8.6	+8.3
Turnout		45,855	64.6	+3.3
PS gain from UMP		Swing		

=== 2002 ===
Summary of the 9 June and 16 June 2002 French legislative election in Calvados' 1st Constituency
Candidate	Party		1st round		2nd round	
Candidate	Party		Votes	%	Votes	%
Brigitte Le Brethon	Union for a Popular Movement	UMP	18,402	42.88%	20,844	50.14%
Philippe Duron	Socialist Party	PS	15,697	36.58%	20,728	49.86%
Maurice Heuze	Front National	FN	2,463	5.74%		
Etienne Adam	Far Left	EXG	1,320	3.08%		
Marie-Jeanne Gobert	Communist	PCF	909	2.12%		
Blaise Hersent-Lechatreux	Miscellaneous Left	DVG	788	1.84%		
Alexandra Frapier	Hunting, Fishing, Nature, Traditions	CPNT	725	1.69%		
Philippe Bonneau	Citizen and Republican Movement	MCR	479	1.12%		
Hervé Boullay Du	Movement for France	MPF	477	1.11%		
Pierre Casevitz	Workers’ Struggle	LO	427	1.00%		
J. Claude Cherrier	Ecologist	ECO	414	0.96%		
Yves Dupres	National Republican Movement	MNR	397	0.93%		
Bernard Morin	Divers	DIV	274	0.64%		
Philippe Pierrat	Divers	DIV	92	0.21%		
Martine Goulet	Far Right	EXD	47	0.11%		
Najet Matmati	Miscellaneous Left	DVG	0	0.00%		
Total			42,911	100%	41,572	100%
Registered voters			69,518		69,518	
Blank/Void ballots			636	1.46%	1,014	2.38%
Turnout			43,547	62.64%	42,586	61.26%
Abstentions			25,971	37.36%	26,932	38.74%
Result					UMP GAIN FROM PS	

=== 1997 ===
Legislative Election 1997: Calvados's 1st constituency
Party	Candidate	Votes	%	±%
UDF	Francis Saint-Ellier	13,549	33.93	
PS	Philippe Duron	13,013	32.58	
FN	Yves Duprès	4,048	10.14	
PCF	Lysianne Broudic	3,242	8.12	
LV	Michel Horn	1,731	4.33	
MPF	Hervé de Boullay	1,450	3.63	
GE	Martine Michau-Baudeuf	1,383	3.46	
Others	N/A	1,520		
Turnout		41,706	63.78	
2nd round result
PS	Philippe Duron	23,070	52.62	
UDF	Francis Saint-Ellier	20,769	47.38	
Turnout		45,777	70.04	
PS gain from UDF				
