= André Détolle =

French politician

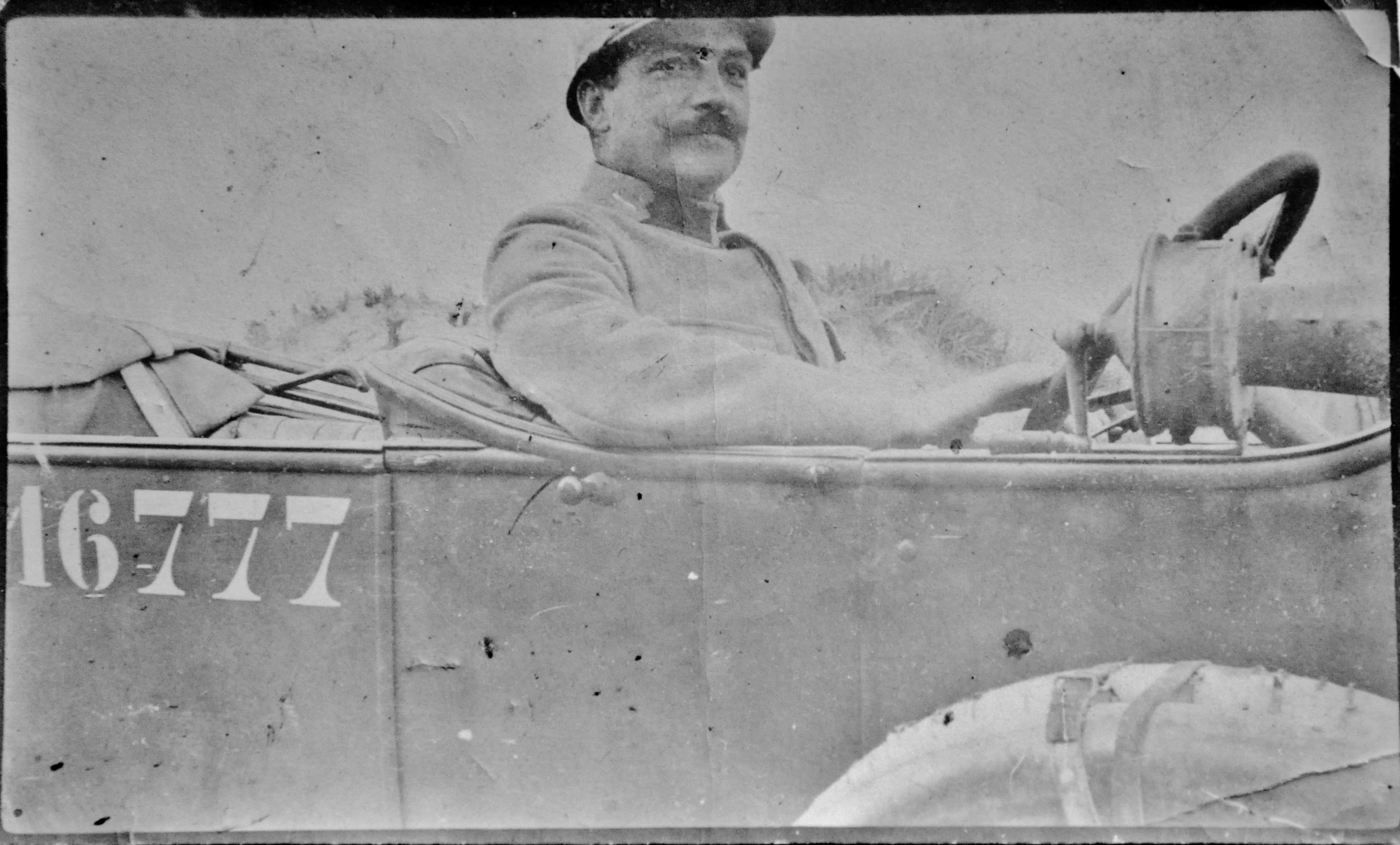

Mayor of Caen
- In office 15 May 1925 – 14 September 1944
- Preceded by: Armand Marie
- Succeeded by: Yves Guillou

Personal details
- Born: 13 December 1876; Paris, France
- Died: 11 November 1962 (aged 85); Caen, France
- Political party: Republican Union
- Education: Lycée Malherbe
- Alma mater: École de commerce du Havre

André Détolle (13 December 1876 – 11 November 1962) was a French politician, who was mayor of Caen between 1925 and 1944.

== See also ==
- List of mayors of Caen

Political offices
Preceded by Armand Marie	Mayor of Caen; 1925–1944	Succeeded by Yves Guillou
