= Port of Caen =

Coordinates: 49°14′N 0°17′W

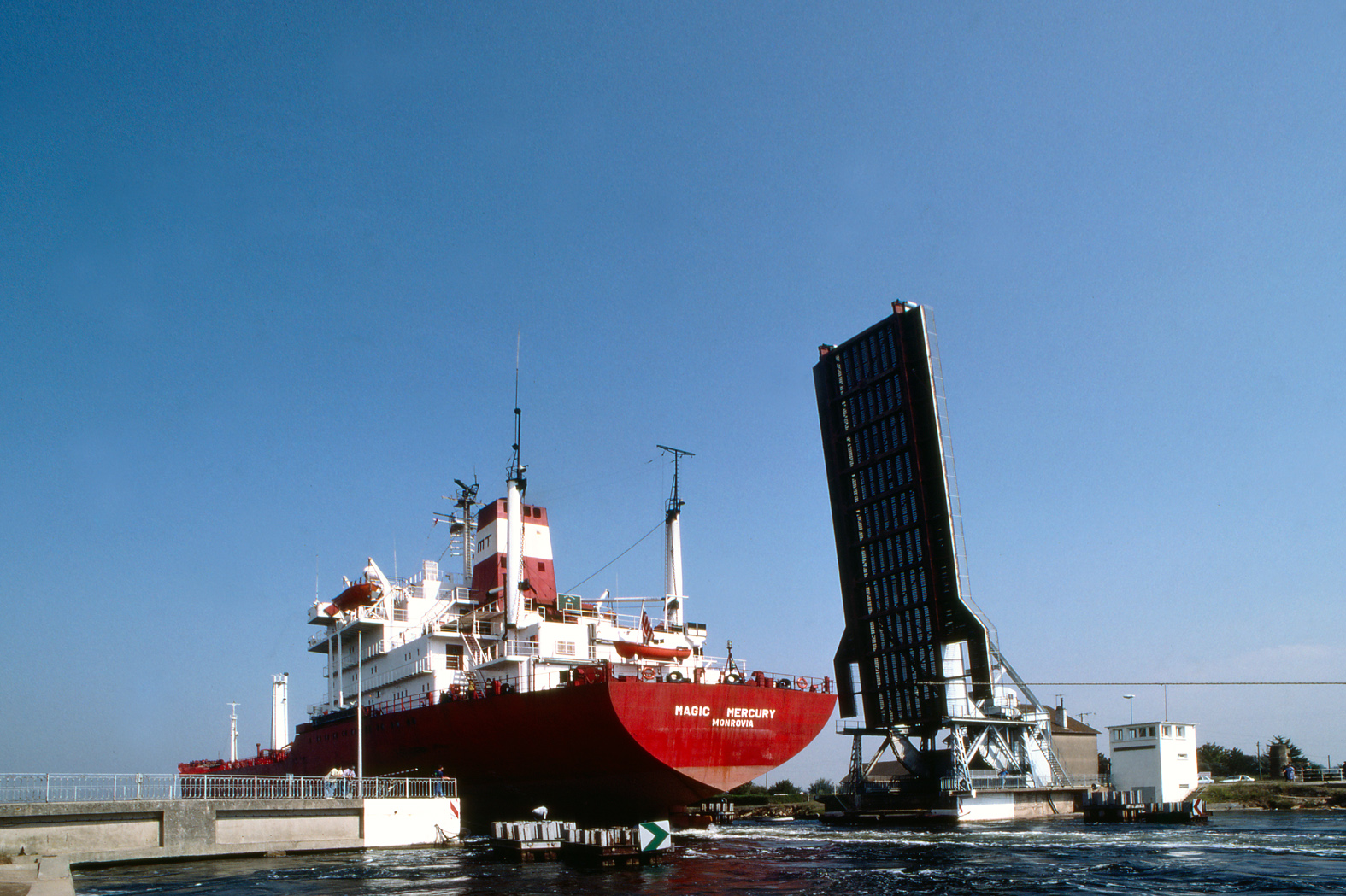

The Port of Caen (French: Port de Caen) is the harbour and port authority of the Norman city of Caen, France.

The port of Caen is composed of a series of basins on the Canal de Caen à la Mer, linking Caen to Ouistreham, 15 km (9.3 m) downstream, on the English Channel.

== Layout ==
The port of Caen was originally composed solely of the Bassin Saint-Pierre, in the centre of Caen. Increase in traffic explains the digging up and creation of four more; the Nouveau Bassin (cruises), Bassin de Calix, Bassin de Hérouville (miscellaneous) and Bassin de Blainville (cereals). A new canal, as well as a new concert venue (the Cargö), were built next to the junction between the Canal and the Bassin Saint-Pierre, creating a sharp contrast with the disused warehouses.

The Bassin Saint-Pierre is used as a marina and is kept afloat with a height adjustable dam on the River Orne. The Nouveau Bassin, directly east of Saint-Pierre, although it receives cruise ships and ferries in need of berthing or repairs, is not in regular use.

The Viaduc de Calix, a large concrete viaduct, passes over the Orne valley and the canal. It has been built high enough to permit the transit of large tonnage ships. The Bassin de Calix, directly below the viaduct, is the only basin in regular use. Several cranes are used to load and unload cargo, mostly wood, onto lorries or trains.

Ships transporting cereals use Blainville wharf. Ships are stationed directly against the canal wall and load and unloaded by cranes and cereal silos.

=== Ouistreham ===
At the entrance of the canal is the Port of Caen's cross-channel ferry port.

The terminal building is situated in the western part of the terminal. Two sets of locks, beyond the seaport, keep the canal navigable towards Caen. The lock is composed to two lock basins and a lock keeper's tower.

The entrance to the port is a dredged channel, 8 m deep, below the hydrographic zero and 90 m long. The access channel itself is two nautical miles (4 km) long, on a 184°5 axis, indicated by aligned luminous signalling. The channel, 150 m wide is bordered, to the west and the east by three sea mark buoys.

The outer harbour is a 250 m in diameter avoidance zone, permitting ferries to turn around.

Ouistreham possesses two ferry berths; Poste T1 and Poste T2.

- Poste T1 was built in 1986, it is capable of berthing ships up to 145 m long and 24 m wide. The minimum water depth is 5 m 50 cm at low tide.
- Poste T2 was built in 1992, it is capable of berthing ferries up to 165 m long and 26 m wide, on a dock wall 217 m long. Depth is kept at a minimum of 6 m above hydrographic zero.
- The tugboat is stationed between posts T1 and T2 in a 38 m long secluded.

The terminal itself is divided in two areas, T1 and T2, respectively 15 400 m^{2} and 56 100 m^{2} in area. The terminal's total area is 100 000 m^{2}.

=== Brittany Ferries ===
Up to three sailings of Brittany Ferries depart Ouistreham per day. It is the Port of Caen's English Channel ferry port.

In the summer season, the MV Guillaume de Normandie and MV Mont St Michel operate the back-to-back, six-hour ferry crossing. Ferries depart both Ouistreham and Portsmouth International Port at 08:15 (and arrive at 14:30), 16:30 (and arrive at 21:15) and 22:00 (and arrive the next morning).

This schedule begins in May and is carried through until October, when ferries start to go in for refits; hence they are deployed on different routes.

== Pleasure boating ==
The traffic has decreased during the last twenty years. The port of Caen has however been used to accommodate several racing yachts such as the Kingfisher (2nd - Vendée Globe 2001, sailed by Ellen MacArthur, and 1st Route du Rhum 2002) and Gartmore (9th - Vendée Globe 2001). As well as racing ships, the port of Caen is the regular port-of-call for sailing ships, the Belem and the HMY Britannia.

== Statistics ==
During July 2006 the Port of Caen transported 317 274 tons of cargo and 133 959 passengers (32 538 cars and 9 483 lorries).

Between 2004 and 2006, the Port of Caen transported (in tons per year):

Nature of cargo	2004	2005	2006
Coal	29 854	19 044	9 762
Scandinavian wood	28 076	26 524	15 569
Exotic wood	81 931	95 216	53 888
Molasses	5 294	9 059	0
Cereal	339 629	338 830	216 187
Animal food	0	13 193	3 159
Manure	110 375	91 322	51 460
Metal scrap	113 037	78 292	57 391
Ligne Algérie (Sudcargos)	5 234	911	0
Miscellaneous	62 270	61 349	87 162
