= List of mayors of Caen =

Mayor of Caen
- Incumbent; Aristide Olivier since 16 July 2024
- Residence: Abbaye aux Hommes, Caen
- Appointer: Universal suffrage
- Term length: 6 years
- Formation: 1203
- First holder: Simon d'Escures
- Website: https://www.caen.fr

This is a list of mayors of Caen since 1925.

== List of mayors ==
Name	Born-died	Term start	Term end	Party
André Détolle	1876–1962	1925	1944	Republican Union
Yves Guillou	1880–1963	1945	1959	Rally of the French People
Jean-Marie Louvel	1900–1970	1959	1970	Popular Republican Movement
Jean-Marie Girault	1926–2016	1970	2001	Union for French Democracy
Brigitte Le Brethon	1951–	2001	2008	Union for a Popular Movement
Philippe Duron	1947–	2008	2014	Socialist Party
Joël Bruneau	1963–	2014	2020	The Republicans
Joël Bruneau	1963–	2020	2024	The Republicans
Aristide Olivier	1981–	2024	2026	Independent

== See also ==
- Timeline of Caen
