= Joël Bruneau =

French politician (born 1963)

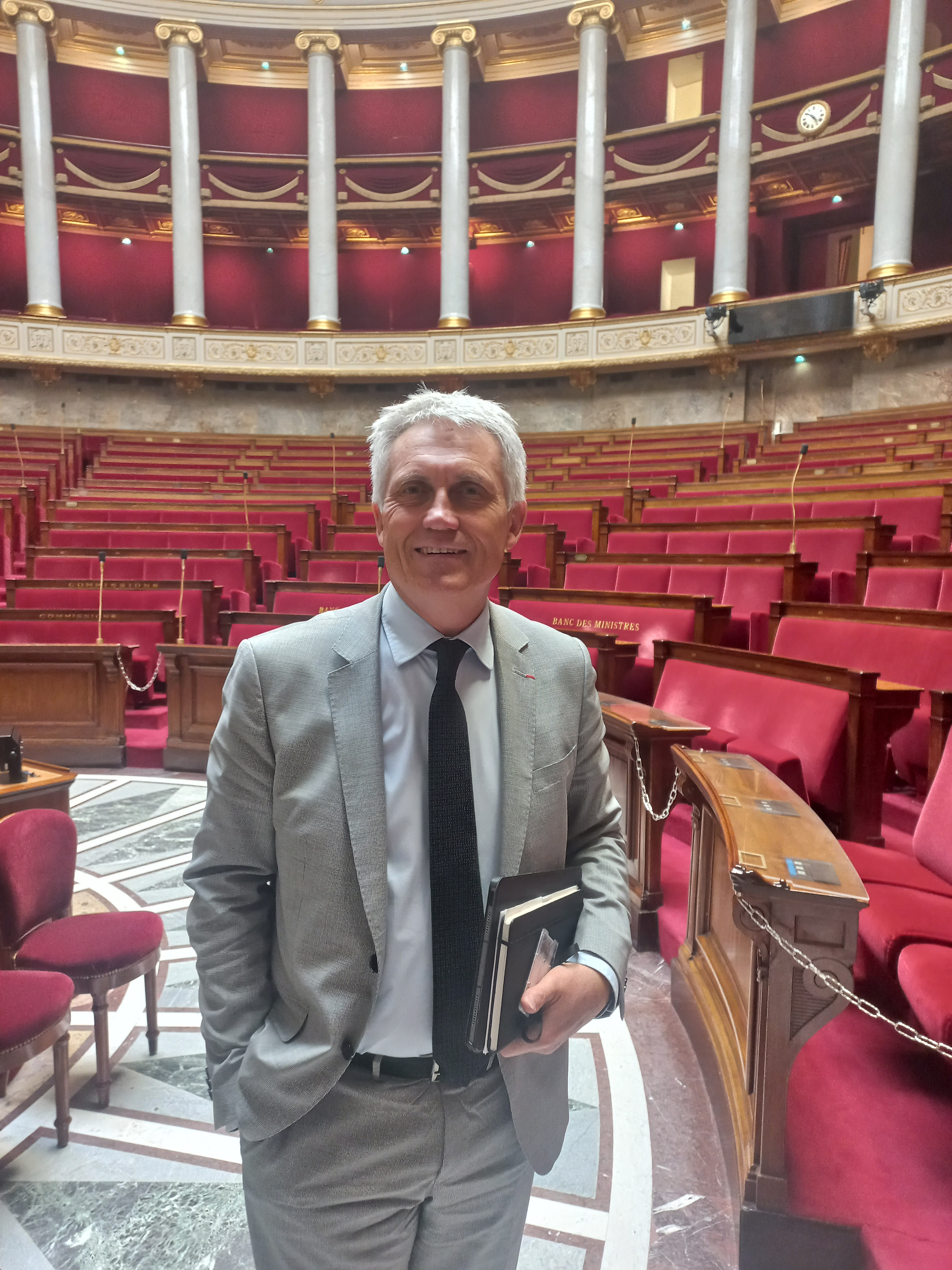

Member of the National Assembly for Calvados's 1st constituency
- Incumbent
- Assumed office 18 July 2024
- Preceded by: Fabrice Le Vigoureux

Mayor of Caen
- In office 5 April 2014 – 16 July 2024
- Preceded by: Philippe Duron
- Succeeded by: Aristide Olivier

President of the Urban community of Caen la Mer
- In office 25 April 2014 – 16 July 2024
- Preceded by: Philippe Duron
- Succeeded by: Nicolas Joyau

Member of the Regional Council of Lower Normandy
- In office 26 March 2010 – 5 April 2014
- President: Laurent Beauvais

Personal details
- Born: 7 September 1963 (age 62) Châteauroux, France
- Party: LIOT; The Republicans
- Spouse: Catherine Mallet (m. 1990)
- Children: 3
- Education: University of Tours; Sciences Po

Joël Bruneau (born 7 September 1963) is a French politician, mayor of Caen between 2014 and 2024. He was reelected in 2020. He is a Deputy for the 1st constituency of Calvados winning in the 2024 French legislative election against Emma Fourreau in the second round.

== Distinctions ==
- Knight of the Legion of Honour.

Political offices
Preceded by Philippe Duron	Mayor of Caen; 2014–2024	Succeeded by Aristide Olivier

== See also ==
- List of mayors of Caen
