= Société Métallurgique de Normandie =

Steel mill in France, 1912–1993

The Société Métallurgique de Normandie (Metallurgic Company of Normandy), or SMN was a steel mill in Caen (Colombelles), Normandy. It opened in 1912 and closed in 1993.

== History ==
In 1910, the Thyssen Group obtained the concession for mining iron in the lower region of Calvados between Soumont and Urville. The Société des Hauts Fourneaux et Aciéries was created by Baron Thyssen two years later, in 1912. The plant was built along the right bank of the River Orne and of the Canal de Caen à la Mer. It originally covered an area 160 hectares and produced 250 000 tons of steel in 1938. Product was exported to the UK, Scandinavia, Spain, Italy, North Africa and other coastal regions of France. The iron mined to the South of Caen was transported on a mineral railway from Potigny. The works were bought by French interests in 1914 and continued to operate until 1940.

The company, under construction, was in great need of labour and imported much of it from abroad up until 1920. The 1930s crisis led to the departure of this labour. The need for qualified labour to operate the plant led to the recall of much of the foreign labour as well as specialised French labour.

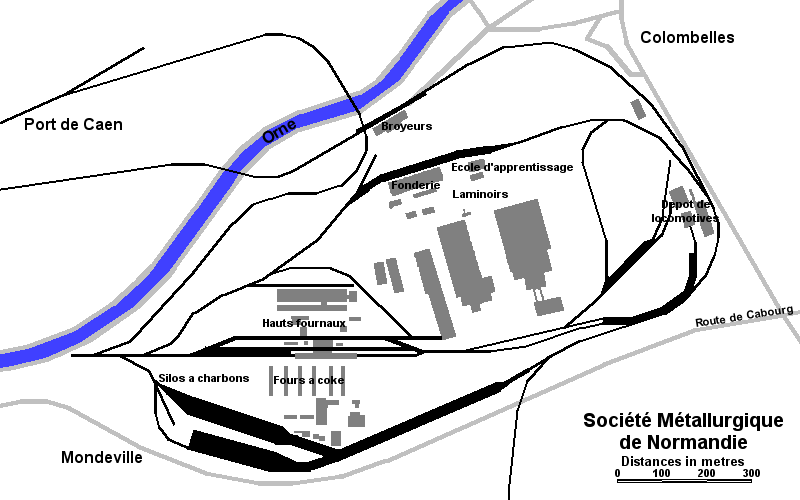
Plan of Société Métallurgique de Normandie steel plant

At the start of World War II the plant employed 4000 workers. In June 1940, Germany began their occupation of Calvados and stopped all work at the SMN. As early as the end of June, the Germans desired to resume production and work resumed. The ovens were not switched on by 1000 workers were employed to maintain the plant. Then, production resumed. Two ovens were switched back on as well as the railway offices. The restart was chaotic since all coal was exported to Germany for the war effort.

The SMN functioned slowly, 3160 workers remained employed. From the beginning of 1942, the Germans gained interest in the plant and it began production of steel bars destined to become bomb casings. In July 1942, due to a shortage in coal, the plant stopped all production. The plant's labour, attracted by good wages in Germany left Caen; the labour diminished from 2500 in March down to 900 in October. At the end of 1943, the plant's labour had diminished down to a skeleton crew of 750.

British bombardments at the end of the war transformed the factory into ruins . It was rebuilt in the years following World War II and resumed maximum activity in 1950.

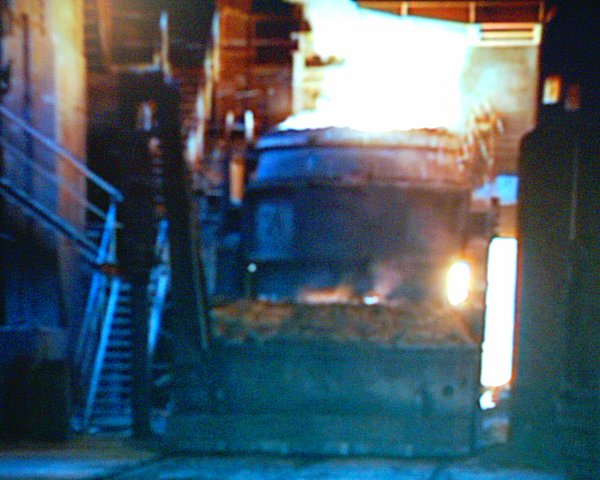
A giant crucible

The steel works' activity increased until 1974 when the plant was forced to adapt its production to the new modern metallurgic environment. From 1986, the SMN was specialised in the production of quality machinery wire rod. The production line was transformed into a short production line, the object being to produce 650 000 tons per year.

Despite efforts, the SMN closed in November 1993.

Demolition of the plant liberated land of 220 hectares. This land is now used exclusively by food-related industry. The chaudron, the plant's old cooling tower is the only remnant of the plant's presence.
