= 2020 Caen municipal election =

- 15 March 2020
| | First party | Second party | Third party |
|---|---|---|---|
| Leader | Joël Bruneau | Rudy L'Orphelin | Gilles Déterville |
| Party | LR | EELV | PS |
| Seats won | 43 | 8 | 2 |
| Popular vote | 10,541 | 5,306 | 1,929 |
| Percentage | 50.79% | 25.57% | 9.3% |
| | Fourth party | Fifth party |
| Leader | Aurélien Guidi | Isabelle Gilbert |
| Party | DVG | RN |
| Seats won | 1 | 1 |
| Popular vote | 1,098 | 1,095 |
| Percentage | 5.29% | 5.28% |
Mayor before election
Joël Bruneau
LR
Elected Mayor
Joël Bruneau
LR

The 2020 Caen municipal election took place on 15 March 2020 in conjunction with the first round of the 2020 French municipal elections throughout the country.

== Electoral history ==
=== Election results in Caen since 2014 ===
List of election results in Caen since 2014
| Election | 1st | | | | | | | | 2nd round | | | | | |
| Election | 1st | % | 2nd | % | 3rd | % | 4th | % | 1st | % | 2nd | % | 3rd | % |
|---|---|---|---|---|---|---|---|---|---|---|---|---|---|---|
| 2014 Municipal election | UMP | 30.79 | PS | 26.21 | UDI | 18.01 | EELV | 10.22 | UMP | 57.03 | PS | 42.96 | - | |
| 2014 European election | UMP | 21.23 | PS | 17.71 | EELV | 14.37 | FN | 13.65 | 1st round of voting only. | | | | | |
| 2015 Regional election | LR | 32.96 | PS | 29.95 | FN | 13.33 | EELV | 10.82 | PS | 46.49 | LR | 40.54 | FN | 12.97 |
| 2017 Presidential election | LREM | 29.55 | LFI | 23.11 | LR | 20.61 | FN | 10.33 | LREM | 82.09 | FN | 17.91 | - | |
| 2019 European election | LREM | 26.80 | EELV | 18.70 | FN | 12.56 | PS | 8.53 | 1st round of voting only. | | | | | |

== Declared candidates ==
=== Lutte Ouvrière ===
The Worker's Struggle party list was led by Pierre Casevitz in Caen.

=== La France Insoumise ===
The La France Insoumise party list was led by Philippe Velten.

=== Socialist Party, Génération.s & GRS ===
The Socialist Party list was led by Gilles Déterville.

=== Caen en commun ===
The Far-left list Caen en commun was led by Aurélien Guidi.

=== Europe Ecology - The Greens, Citoyens à Caen, Community Party & Cap21 ===
The Europe Ecology – The Greens party list was led by Rudy L'Orphelin.

=== The Republicans ===
On 28 August 2018, incumbent Mayor Joël Bruneau announced that he was running for re-election as a member of The Republicans. His list was supported in 2020 by La République En Marche, the Union of Democrats and Independents and the Democratic Movement.

=== National Rally ===
The National Rally list in Caen was led by Isabelle Gilbert.

== Election results ==
2020 Caen municipal election results
| Leader | List | First round | | Seats | |
| Leader | List | Votes | % | CM | CC |
|---|---|---|---|---|---|
| Joël Bruneau | LR-LREM-UDI-MoDem | 10,541 | 50.79 | 43 | 33 |
| Continuons Caen ensemble! avec Joël Bruneau | | 10,541 | 50.79 | 43 | 33 |
| Rudy L'Orphelin | EELV-PRG-PCF-Cap21-Citoyens à Caen | 5,306 | 25.57 | 8 | 6 |
| Caen écologiste et citoyenne | | 5,306 | 25.57 | 8 | 6 |
| Gilles Déterville | PS-G·s-GRS-AE | 1,929 | 9.30 | 2 | 2 |
| Caen au cœur | | 1,929 | 9.30 | 2 | 2 |
| Aurélien Guidi | DVG | 1,098 | 5.29 | 1 | 1 |
| Caen en commun | | 1,098 | 5.29 | 1 | 1 |
| Isabelle Gilbert | RN | 1,095 | 5.28 | 1 | 1 |
| Rassemblement pour Caen | | 1,095 | 5.28 | 1 | 1 |
| Philippe Velten | LFI | 550 | 2.65 | 0 | 0 |
| À Caen, décidons nous-mêmes! | | 550 | 2.65 | 0 | 0 |
| Pierre Casevitz | LO | 233 | 1.12 | 0 | 0 |
| Lutte ouvrière – Faire entendre le camp des travailleurs | | 233 | 1.12 | 0 | 0 |
| Valid votes | | 20,752 | 97.66 | | |
| White votes | | 138 | 0.65 | | |
| Rejected votes | | 360 | 1.69 | | |
| Total | | 21,250 | 100 | 55 | 43 |
| Abstentions | | 34,749 | 61.71 | | |
| Registered voters - voter turnout | | 55,501 | 38.29 | | |

== See also ==
- 2020 French municipal elections
  - 2020 Ain municipal elections
  - 2020 Allier municipal elections
  - 2020 Bas-Rhin municipal elections
  - 2020 Paris municipal election
