= Dominique Robert (politician) =

French politician (1952–2025)

Member of the National Assembly for Calvados's 2nd constituency
- In office 18 May 1991 – 1 April 1993
- Preceded by: Louis Mexandeau
- Succeeded by: Louis Mexandeau

Member of the General Council of Calvados
- In office 1982–1988
- Succeeded by: Anne-Marie Seguin
- Constituency: Canton of Caen-9

Personal details
- Born: Dominique Claire Anne Robert; 12 August 1952; Caen, France
- Died: 11 January 2025 (aged 72); Paris, France
- Political party: Socialist Party
- Education: Sciences Po

Dominique Robert (12 August 1952 – 11 January 2025) was a French politician of the Socialist Party (PS).

== Life and career ==
Born in Caen on 12 August 1952, Robert studied at the Sciences Po. She worked as an administrator for the European Parliament and was the substitute for deputy Louis Mexandeau, assuming the position upon his appointment as Secretary of State for Veterans in 1991. Mexandeau returned to the position in 1993.

Robert died in Paris on 11 January 2025, at the age of 72.

== Decorations ==
- Knight of the Legion of Honour (1999)
