= Robert Bisson (politician) =

French politician (1909–2004)

Member of the National Assembly for Calvados's 2nd constituency
- In office 1958–1981
- Succeeded by: Louis Mexandeau

Mayor of Lisieux
- In office 1953–1977

Personal details
- Born: 10 May 1909 Paris, France
- Died: 6 July 2004 (aged 95) Saint-Cloud, France
- Profession: Pharmacist

Robert Bisson (10 May 1909 – 6 July 2004) was a French politician. He was a member of the National Assembly representing Calvados's 2nd constituency. He also served as Mayor of Lisieux.

== Biography ==
Robert Bisson studied medicine and became a Pharmacist. He settled in Lisieux in 1932. He joined the city council in 1947 and became deputy mayor the following year. In 1949, he was elected general councilor for the canton of Lisieux-2. In 1953, he became mayor of the city. He ran for deputy in the Lisieux-Falaise constituency in the 1958 legislative elections, where he was elected.

He was systematically re-elected to all his elected offices. In 1970, he became president of the Departmental Council of Calvados. He was chairman of the supervisory board of the Caisse des Dépôts et Consignations from 1973 to 1981. He was a signatory of the “Appeal of the 43” in favor of Valéry Giscard d'Estaing candidacy in the 1974 presidential election. He retired from political life in 1981 at the same time as he left his office.

Today, the Robert-Bisson Hospital Centre bears his name.
