= Jean-Marie Girault =

French politician

Mayor of Caen
- In office 16 July 1970 – 24 March 2001
- Preceded by: Jean-Marie Louvel
- Succeeded by: Brigitte Le Brethon

Member of the French Senate for Calvados
- In office 2 October 1971 – 30 September 1998
- Preceded by: Jean-Marie Louvel
- Succeeded by: René Garrec

Personal details
- Born: 9 February 1926 Pont-l'Évêque, France
- Died: 1 May 2016 (aged 90) Caen, France
- Party: UDF
- Education: University of Caen
- Profession: Lawyer

Jean-Marie Girault (9 February 1926 – 1 May 2016) was a French politician and former mayor of Caen.

== See also ==
- List of mayors of Caen

Political offices
Preceded by Jean-Marie Louvel	Mayor of Caen; 1970–2001	Succeeded by Brigitte Le Brethon
