= Yves Guillou =

French politician (1880–1963)

Mayor of Caen
- In office 18 May 1945 – 19 March 1959
- Preceded by: André Détolle
- Succeeded by: Jean-Marie Louvel

Personal details
- Born: 16 December 1880 Bourbriac, France
- Died: 27 February 1963 (aged 82) Caen, France
- Party: Rally of the French People

Yves Guillou (16 December 1880 – 27 February 1963) was a French politician. He was the first mayor of Caen in the post-war era.

== See also ==
- List of mayors of Caen

Political offices
Preceded by André Détolle	Mayor of Caen; 1945–1959	Succeeded by Jean-Marie Louvel
