= Wanquetin =

- Commune
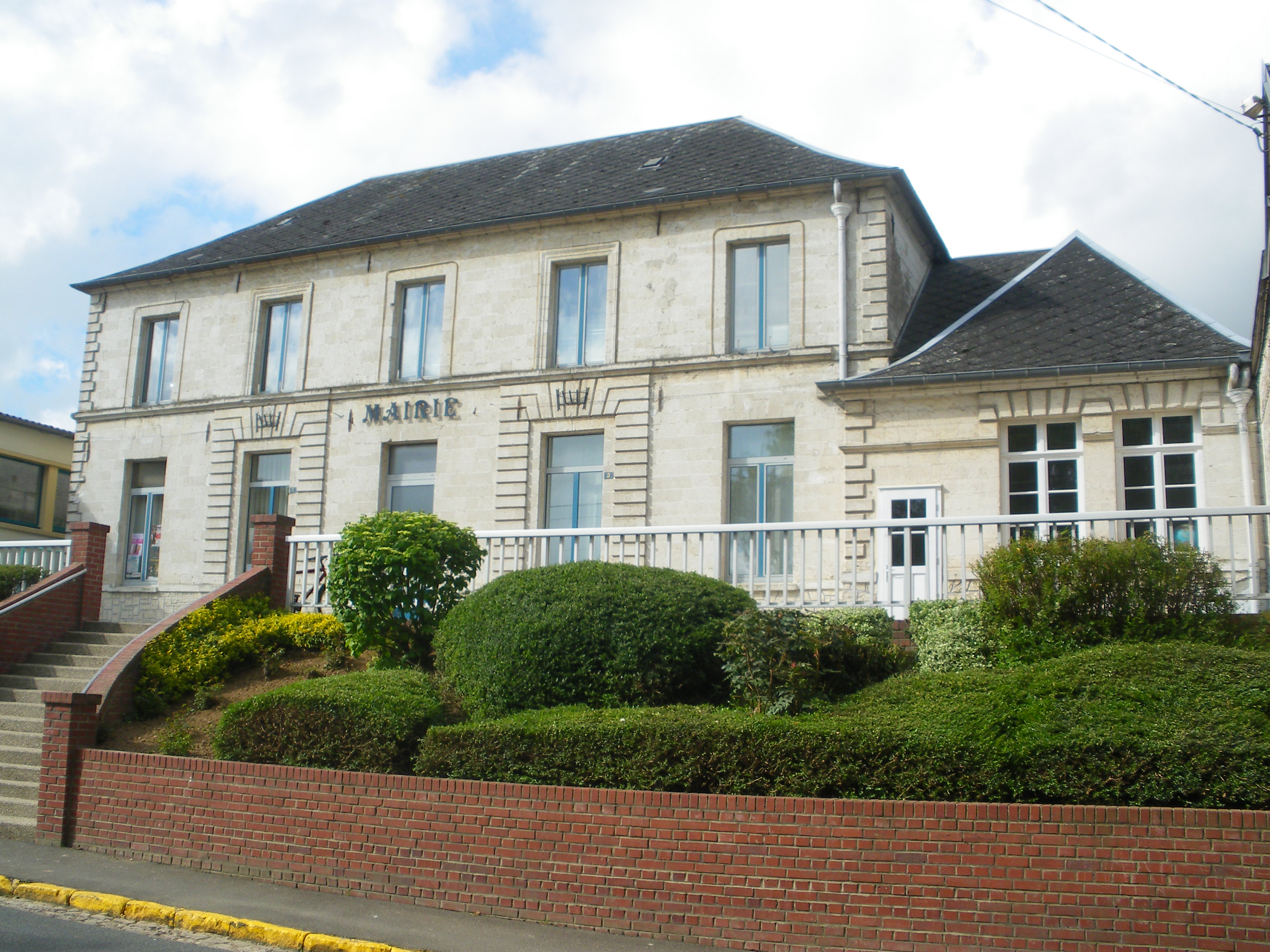
- The town hall of Wanquetin
- Location of Wanquetin
- Location within France Location within Hauts-de-France
- Coordinates: 50°16′36″N 2°36′57″E
- Country: France
- Region: Hauts-de-France
- Department: Pas-de-Calais
- Arrondissement: Arras
- Canton: Avesnes-le-Comte
- Intercommunality: Campagnes de l'Artois

Government
  - Mayor (2020–2026): Emmanuel Ioos
- Area^{1}: 10.18 km^{2} (3.93 sq mi)
- Elevation: 91 m (299 ft)
- Highest elevation: 141 m (463 ft)
- Lowest elevation: 82 m (269 ft)
- Population (2023): 748
  - Density: 73.5/km^{2} (190/sq mi)
- Time zone: UTC+01:00 (CET)
  - Summer (DST): UTC+02:00 (CEST)
- INSEE/Postal code: 62874 /62123
- ^{1} French Land Register data, which excludes lakes, ponds, glaciers > 1 km^{2} (0.386 sq mi or 247 acres) and river estuaries.

Wanquetin (French pronunciation: [wɑ̃ktɛ̃]) is a commune in the Pas-de-Calais department in the Hauts-de-France region of France.

== Geography ==
Wanquetin is situated some 7.5 miles (12 km) west of Arras, at the junction of the D59 and the D7 roads.

== Population ==
Historical population
Year	Pop.	±% p.a.
1968	560	—
1975	602	+1.04%
1982	642	+0.92%
1990	682	+0.76%
1999	639	−0.72%
2007	687	+0.91%
2012	714	+0.77%
2017	719	+0.14%
2023	748	+0.66%
Source: INSEE

== Places of interest ==
- The church of St. Martin, dating from the eighteenth century
- A nineteenth-century Protestant church
- The Commonwealth War Graves Commission cemeteries

== See also ==
- Communes of the Pas-de-Calais department
