= Jean-Marie Louvel =

French engineer and politician

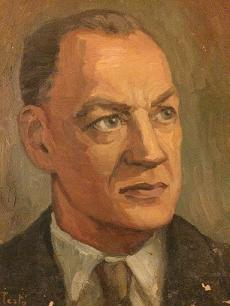
- Jean-Marie Louvel in the 1950s

Mayor of Caen
- In office 20 March 1959 – 13 June 1970
- Preceded by: Yves Guillou
- Succeeded by: Jean-Marie Girault

Personal details
- Born: 1 July 1900 La Ferté-Macé, France
- Died: 13 June 1970 (aged 69) Caen, France
- Party: Popular Republican Movement
- Education: Lycée Malherbe
- Alma mater: École Polytechnique

Jean-Marie Louvel (French pronunciation: [ʒɑ̃ maʁi luvɛl]; 1 July 1900 – 13 June 1970) was a French engineer and politician. He was born in La Ferté-Macé and died in Caen.

== Biography ==
Born into an old Norman family originally from Saint-Georges-de-Rouelley, he attended Malherbe High School in Caen and studied at École Polytechnique (Class of X1920N) and Supélec(École Supérieure d'Électricité). An engineer, he joined Vinci SA (SGE), where he oversaw the installation of a thermal power plant in Saarland and then the construction of a hydroelectric power plant in Morocco between 1928 and 1930. In 1936, he took charge of the company's electrical services. Mobilized in 1939 as an artillery officer, he was awarded the Croix de Guerre.

A member of the MRP, of which he was treasurer for a time, he headed his party's list in Calvados (department) for the two constituent assemblies in October 1945 and June 1946, obtaining 49% and then 41.5% of the vote. He was re-elected as MRP deputy for Calvados for the first legislature of the French Fourth Republic in November 1946.

President of the National Equipment and Production Commission at the Palais Bourbon between 1945 and January 1950, in 1946 he headed the nationalization commission and, in this capacity, negotiated substantial compensation for the shareholders of electricity companies, including his former employer, SGE, and its CEO Paul Huvelin, with Minister Marcel Paul. He also sat on the National Defense Committee and the Radio and Cinema Press Committee. When the nationalization law was put to the vote in April 1946, he and a few other MRP deputies chose to "abstain from voting," unlike the majority of the MRP group, who voted in favor of the law. However, from 1948 onwards, alongside Marcel Paul and Albert Caquot, he led the "Committee for the Defense of Energy Infrastructure," which opposed cuts in funding for France's hydroelectric infrastructure.

Close to Georges Bidault, he became Minister of Industry in February 1950 and retained his portfolio until June 1954, despite the succession of the Bidault, Queille, Pleven, Faure, Pinay, Mayer, and Laniel cabinets.A supporter of liberalism, he managed to reconcile the desires of employers with the requirements of the economic planning in France during a period of significant economic expansion. With a keen interest in the energy sector, he committed France to oil exploration in Algeria and encouraged French companies, including SGE and Compagnie Générale d'Électricité, to invest in the exploitation of oil fields. He created the National Institute of Industrial Property (France) in 1950, implemented the European Coal and Steel Community, and established the French film aid fund in 1952.

Political offices
Preceded by Yves Guillou	Mayor of Caen; 1959–1970	Succeeded by Jean-Marie Girault
