= Rodolphe Thomas =

French politician (born 1962)

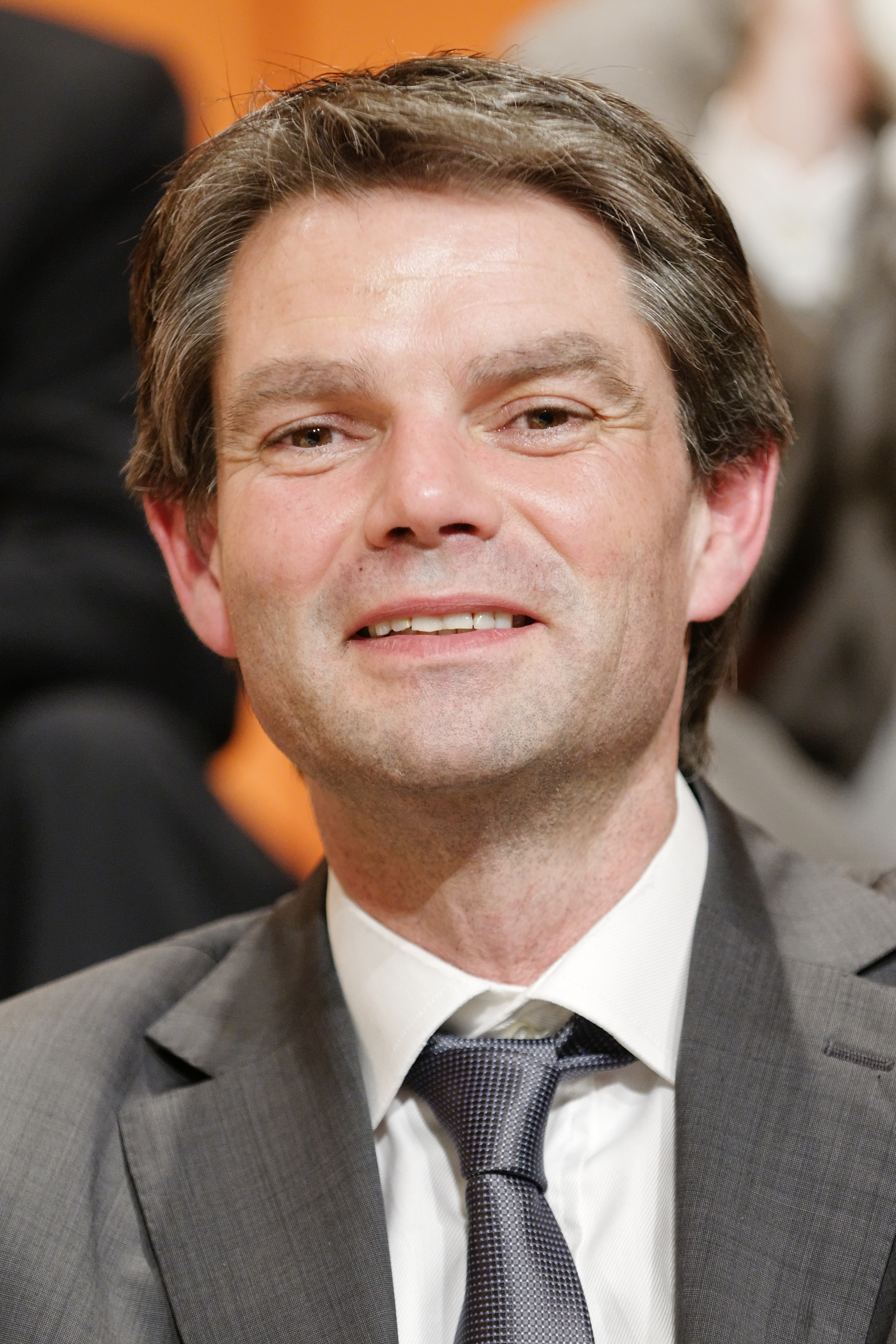
- Rodolphe Thomas in 2010

Mayor of Hérouville-Saint-Clair
- Incumbent
- Assumed office 18 June 2001
- Preceded by: François Geindre

Member of the National Assembly for Calvados's 2nd constituency
- In office 19 June 2002 – 20 June 2007
- Preceded by: Louis Mexandeau
- Succeeded by: Laurence Dumont

Personal details
- Born: 8 August 1962 (age 62); Falaise, Calvados, France
- Political party: MoDem

Rodolphe Thomas (born 8 August 1962) is a French politician and member of the MoDem.

Born in Falaise, he moved to the new town of Hérouville-Saint-Clair in 1966, where his parents opened one of the first stores in the city.

After one term in the municipal council, sitting on the right-wing opposition benches, he won a surprise victory in the traditionally Socialist town of Hérouville-Saint-Clair in the 2001 local elections, mostly due to the division of the left. He became first vice-president of the Agglomeration community of Caen la Mer. In the 2002 legislative election, he defeated the Socialist incumbent Louis Mexandeau in the Calvados's 2nd constituency as a Union for French Democracy (UDF) candidate.

He was politically close to Jean-Louis Borloo, but also a close supporter of UDF leader François Bayrou. However, he supported Nicolas Sarkozy in the second round of the 2007 presidential election and ran for re-election supported by the Presidential Majority and Bayrou's new party, the MoDem. He was, however, defeated by Laurence Dumont (PS).

Following his defeat, he became a closer supporter of Bayrou and ran simultaneously for re-election as Mayor of Hérouville-Saint-Clair in the 2008 municipal elections but also against a PS incumbent in Caen's 6th canton in the cantonal elections. He was re-elected Mayor with over 53% of the votes by the first round, and won his cantonal race in Caen-6 in the runoff.

In 2009, he was selected to be the MoDem's candidate in Lower Normandy for the 2010 regional elections.
