= Colombelles =

- Commune
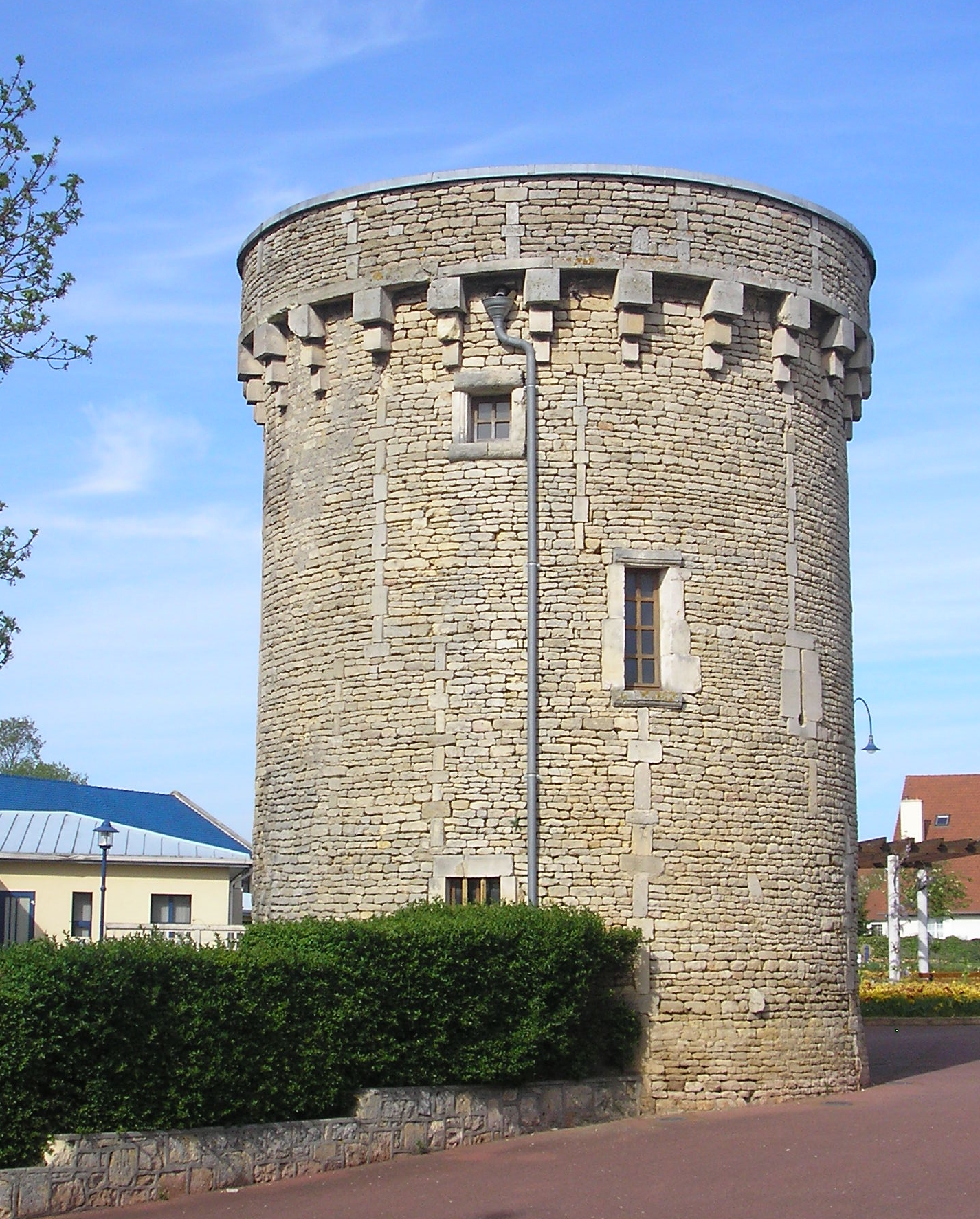
- Norman tower

- Coat of arms
- Location of Colombelles
- Location within France Location within Normandy
- Coordinates: 49°12′18″N 0°17′46″W
- Country: France
- Region: Normandy
- Department: Calvados
- Arrondissement: Caen
- Canton: Hérouville-Saint-Clair
- Intercommunality: CU Caen la Mer

Government
  - Mayor (2020–2026): Marc Pottier
- Area^{1}: 7.14 km^{2} (2.76 sq mi)
- Elevation: 40 m (130 ft)
- Highest elevation: 49 m (161 ft)
- Lowest elevation: 2 m (6.6 ft)
- Population (2023): 7,243
  - Density: 1,010/km^{2} (2,630/sq mi)
- Time zone: UTC+01:00 (CET)
  - Summer (DST): UTC+02:00 (CEST)
- INSEE/Postal code: 14167 /14460
- ^{1} French Land Register data, which excludes lakes, ponds, glaciers > 1 km^{2} (0.386 sq mi or 247 acres) and river estuaries.

Colombelles (French pronunciation: [kɔlɔ̃bɛl]) is a commune in the Calvados department in the Normandy region in northwestern France.

It is located on the Canal de Caen à la Mer.

== Population ==
The population of this sleepy little village mushroomed after August Thyssen bought some land in 1909 and established a steel mill there.

Historical population

Year	Pop.	±% p.a.
1901	153	—
1906	169	+2.01%
1911	188	+2.15%
1921	2,039	+26.92%
1926	2,556	+4.62%
1931	3,308	+5.29%
1936	3,455	+0.87%
1946	2,021	−5.22%
1954	3,526	+7.20%
1962	5,122	+4.78%

Year	Pop.	±% p.a.
1968	5,668	+1.70%
1975	5,566	−0.26%
1982	5,306	−0.68%
1990	5,695	+0.89%
1999	6,242	+1.02%
2007	5,771	−0.98%
2012	5,764	−0.02%
2017	6,918	+3.72%
2023	7,243	+0.77%

Source: EHESS and INSEE (1968-2023)

== Notable people ==
- Jean Hougron (1923–2001) a novelist was born here.

== International relations ==
Colombelles is twinned with Fremington, Devon (UK) since 1983 and with Steinheim am Albuch (Baden-Württemberg, Germany) since 1986 (see that article in German).

== See also ==
- Société Métallurgique de Normandie
- Communes of the Calvados department
