= Laurent Beauvais =

French politician (born 1952)

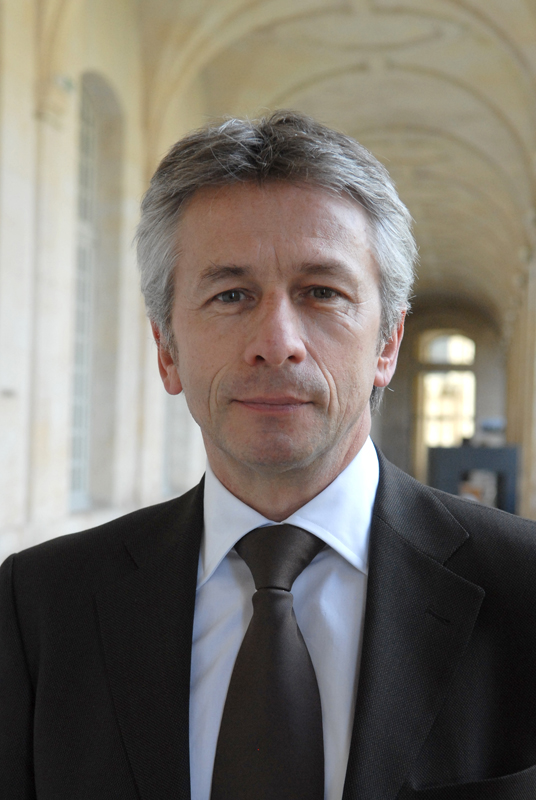
- Beauvais in 2010

President of the Regional Council of Lower Normandy
- In office 2008–2016
- Preceded by: Philippe Duron
- Succeeded by: Hervé Morin (as President of the Regional Council of Normandy)

Personal details
- Born: 24 June 1952 (age 74) Nogent-le-Rotrou, France
- Party: Socialist Party
- Education: University of Caen Normandy; Sciences Po; Paris Dauphine University

Laurent Beauvais (born 24 June 1952) is a French politician of the Socialist Party who served as President of the Regional Council of Lower Normandy.

== Early life ==
Born in Nogent-le-Rotrou, Eure-et-Loir, Beauvais grew up in Évreux then Mortrée near Argentan (Orne).

== Political career ==
Beauvais joined the Socialist Party at age 21 and he was elected to the Mortrée municipal council in 1977. He worked in the cabinets of various Socialist Research Ministers, and was a member of the French National Centre for Scientific Research (CNRS). He did not run for re-election in Mortrée in 1989, choosing to run on the list of François Doubin (MRG) in Argentan. Following Doubin's election, he became deputy mayor. Elected opposition regional councillor in 1998, elected to lead the Communauté de communes of Argentan in 2001, he finally became vice-president of the Lower Normandy Regional Council; responsible for Education, Higher Education and Research under Socialist President Philippe Duron.

Following Philippe Duron's election as Mayor of Caen, Beauvais succeeded him as President of the Regional Council. He will run for a full term in his own right as the PS' top candidate in the region in the 2010 regional elections.

In the Socialist Party's 2011 primaries, Beauvais endorsed Martine Aubry as the party's candidate for the 2012 presidential election.

== Honors and awards ==
- Knight of the Order of Legion of Honour
- Officer of the Ordre National du Mérite
- Officer of the Ordre du Mérite Maritime
