= Aristide Olivier =

French politician (born 1981)

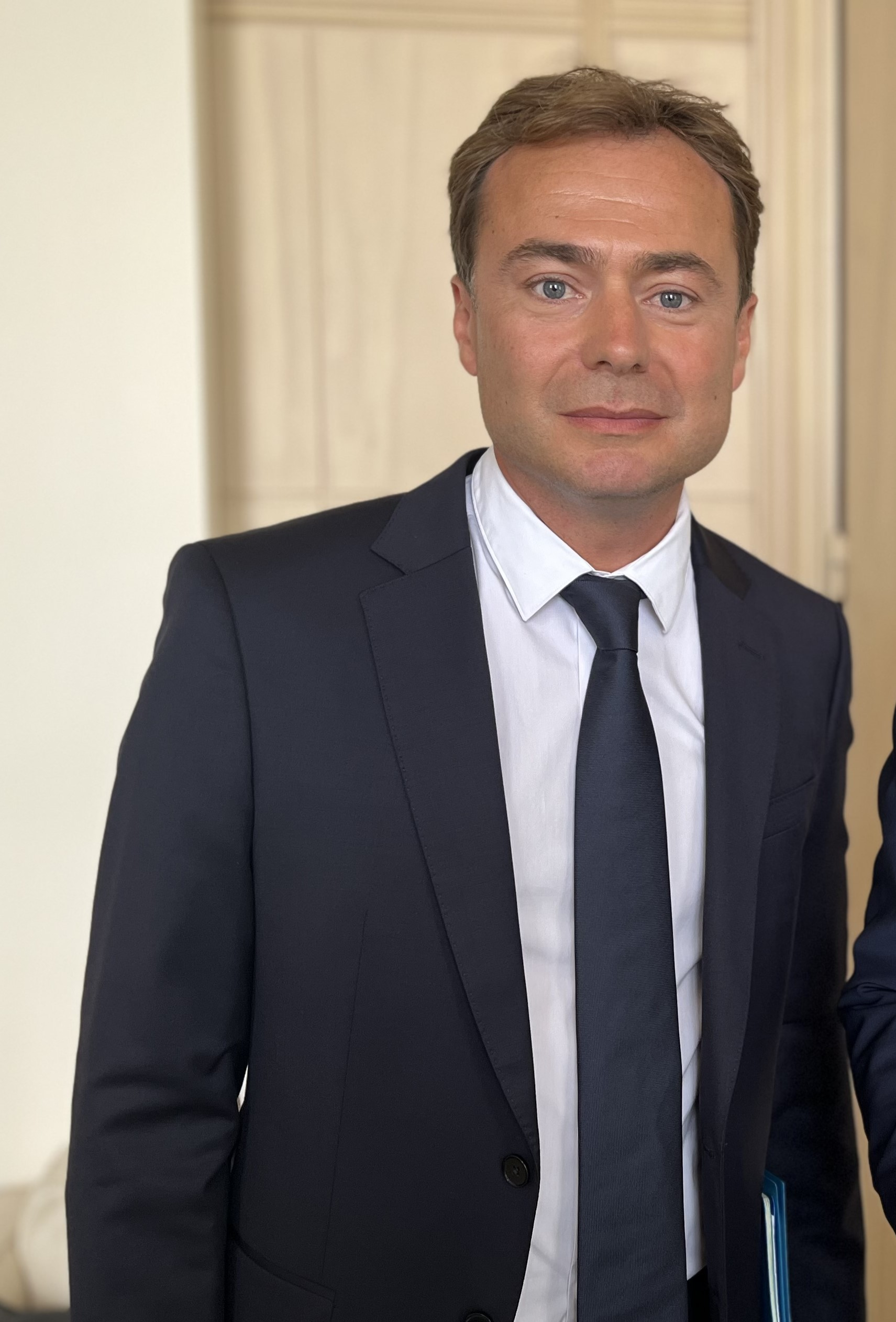
- Olivier in 2024

Mayor of Caen
- Incumbent
- Assumed office 8 July 2024
- Preceded by: Joël Bruneau

Member of the Regional Council of Normandy
- Incumbent
- Assumed office 2 July 2021
- President: Hervé Morin

Personal details
- Born: 26 September 1981 (age 45) Caen, France
- Party: Independent
- Education: University of Caen Normandy

Aristide Olivier (born 26 September 1981) is a French politician serving as mayor of Caen since 2024. He has been a member of the Regional Council of Normandy since 2021.
