= Brigitte Le Brethon =

French politician

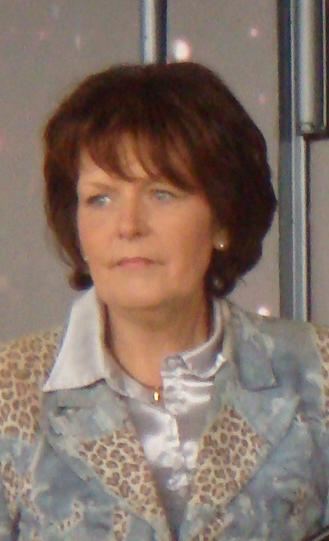
- Brigitte Le Brethon at a meeting in 2008

Mayor of Caen
- In office 24 March 2001 – 23 March 2008
- Preceded by: Jean-Marie Girault
- Succeeded by: Philippe Duron

Deputy Mayor of Caen
- In office 14 March 1983 – 24 March 2001
- Mayor: Jean-Marie Girault

Member of the National Assembly for Calvados's 1st constituency
- In office 19 June 2002 – 19 June 2007
- Preceded by: Philippe Duron
- Succeeded by: Philippe Duron

Personal details
- Born: 8 March 1951 (age 75) Campeaux, France
- Party: The Republicans; UMP
- Education: University of Caen Normandy
- Profession: Teacher

Brigitte Le Brethon (born 8 March 1951) is a French politician, and a member of The Republicans. She was born in Campeaux, Calvados, France.

She was the mayor of Caen from 2001 to 2008. She was Caen's first woman mayor and was defeated in 2008 by Philippe Duron, a member of the Socialist Party.

She was elected on 16 June 2002, for the 12th legislature (2002–2007), in the First constituency of Calvados.

== Political Office ==
- 14 March 1983 – 19 March 1989 : Deputy mayor of Caen.
- 18 March 1985 – 29 March 1992 : Vice-president of the General Council of Calvados.
- 20 March 1989 – 18 June 1995 : Deputy mayor of Caen.
- 30 March 1992 – 22 March 1998 : Vice-president of the general Council of Calvados.
- 19 March 1995 – 18 March 2001 : Deputy mayor of Caen.
- 6 March 1998 – 15 July 2002 : Vice-president of the regional Council of Lower Normandy.
- 16 June 2002 – 19 June 2007 : Member of the National Assembly in Calvados's 1st constituency.
- 24 March 2001 – 23 March 2008 : Mayor of Caen, France.

== Sources ==
- Official site at the National Assembly

Political offices
Preceded by Jean-Marie Girault	Mayor of Caen; 2001–2008	Succeeded by Philippe Duron
