= Philippe Duron =

French politician

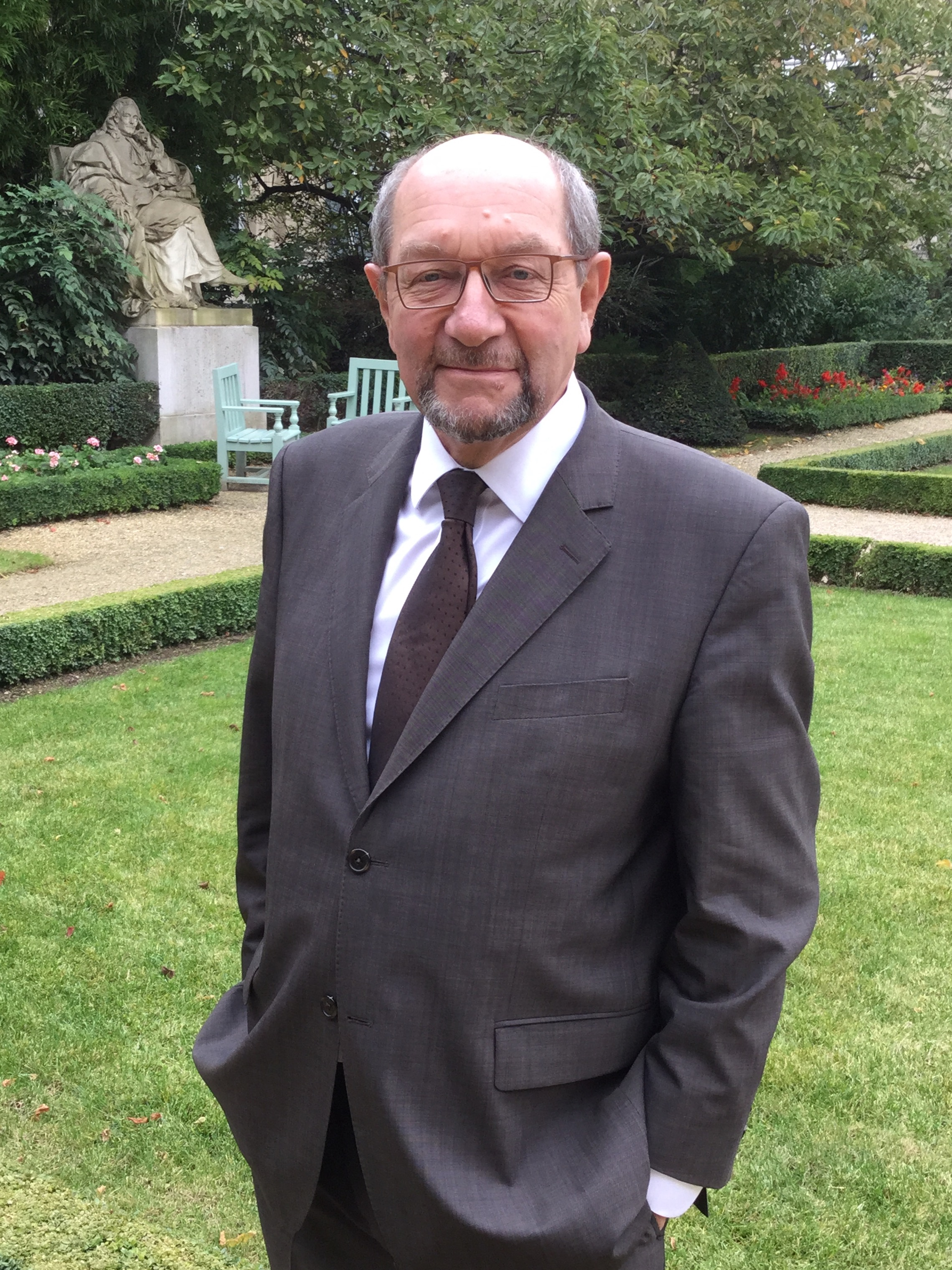

Member of the National Assembly for Calvados's 1st constituency
- In office 20 June 2007 – 20 June 2017
- Preceded by: Brigitte Le Brethon
- Succeeded by: Fabrice Le Vigoureux
- In office 12 June 1997 – 19 June 2002
- Preceded by: Francis Saint-Ellier
- Succeeded by: Brigitte Le Brethon

Mayor of Caen
- In office 23 March 2008 – 5 April 2014
- Preceded by: Brigitte Le Brethon
- Succeeded by: Joël Bruneau

President of the Regional Council of Lower Normandy
- In office 2 April 2004 – 2 April 2008
- Preceded by: René Garrec
- Succeeded by: Laurent Beauvais

Mayor of Louvigny
- In office 20 March 1989 – 2 April 2004
- Preceded by: Joseph Decaen
- Succeeded by: Patrick Ledoux

Personal details
- Born: 19 June 1947 (age 79) Antony, France
- Party: Socialist Party
- Education: University of Caen Normandy
- Profession: Teacher

Philippe Duron (born 19 June 1947) is a French politician. He was the mayor of Caen between 2008 and 2014 and deputy for Calvados's 1st constituency.

Philippe Duron received his Baccalauréat in 1968 and a degree in history from the University of Caen in 1975. He was a teacher in Lisieux and the Lycée Augustin-Fresnel in Caen until 1997. His political models are Pierre Mendès France and François Mitterrand. As first secretary of the Socialist Party in Calvados, he has been successful in uniting the parties on the left in all of Lower Normandy.

He was elected president of the regional council of Lower Normandy on March 28, 2004, the first member of France's Socialist Party to be elected to this office. He defeated the incumbent for 18 years, René Garrec.

Philippe Duron has also been the mayor of Louvigny (Calvados) between 1989 and 2004, and was elected mayor of Caen on 16 March 2008.

He served as deputy to the National Assembly from 1997 to 2001, and again from 2007 to 2017.

Due to the limits on the number of elected positions that can be held simultaneously in France, he stepped down from the regional presidency on 3 April 2008.

Political offices
Preceded by Brigitte Le Brethon	Mayor of Caen; 2008–2014	Succeeded by Joël Bruneau
