= Caen Canal =

Canal in the department of Calvados, France

Canal de Caen à la Mer
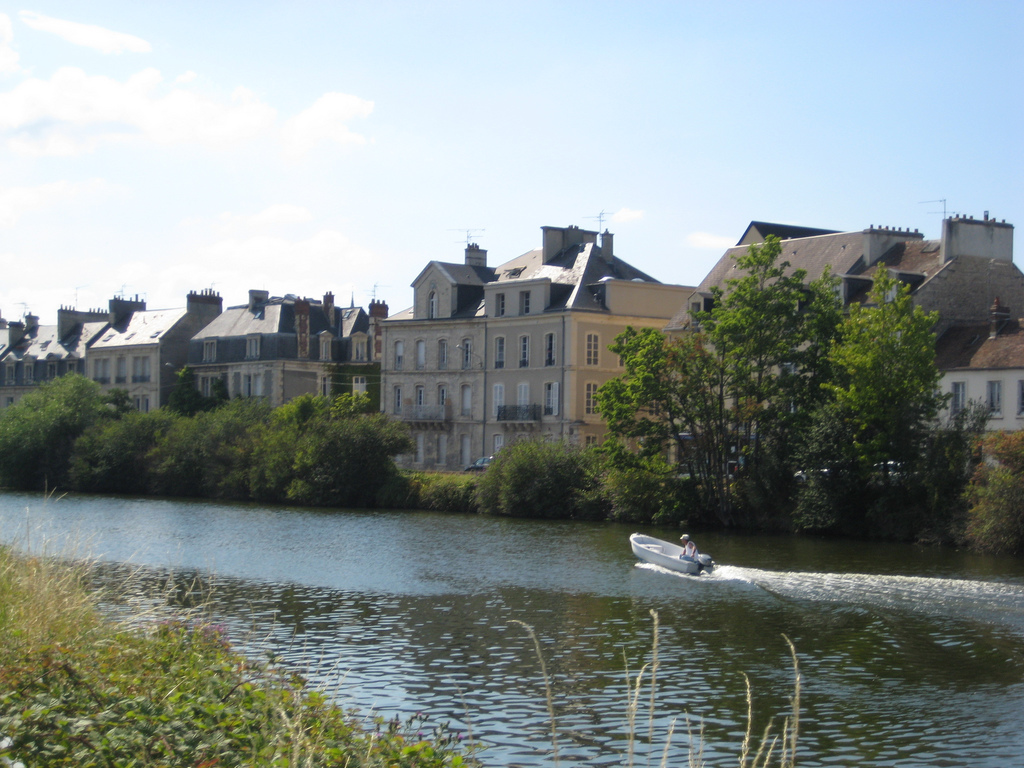
- The Caen Canal to the Sea from the port of Caen Presqu'île
- Interactive map of Canal de Caen à la Mer

Specifications
- Length: 14 km (8.7 mi)
- Locks: 1

History
- Construction began: 1837
- Date completed: 1857

Geography
- Direction: NNE to SSW
- Start point: Port of Caen in Caen
- End point: English Channel in Ouistreham
- Beginning coordinates: 49.18305°N 0.35208°W
- Ending coordinates: 49.27968°N 0.24891°W

Canal de Caen à la Mer (French pronunciation: [kanal də kɑ̃ a la mɛʁ]; English: Canal from Caen to the sea, also called the "Caen Canal") is a short canal in the department (préfecture) of Calvados, France, connecting the Port of Caen, in the city of Caen, downstream to the town of Ouistreham and the English Channel.

Running from north north-east to south south-west, the canal runs parallel to the river Orne which feeds it, it is 14 kilometres (8.7 mi) long, and comprises two locks. Digging began in 1837, and when it was opened on 23 August 1857 it was only 4 metres (13 ft) deep. It was deepened in 1920. The canal began with the dock at St. Peter's Basin (Bassin Saint-Pierre), in the downtown area of Caen. The canal is made up of a group of quays and docks. The current depth is 10 metres (33 ft), and the width can reach 200 metres (660 ft) in the dock of Calix).

The quay at Blainville-sur-Orne measures more than 600 metres (2,000 ft). It acts as the fourth commercial French port for the importation of exotic wood, generally coming from the Gulf of Guinea. It also loads and unloads iron, fertilizer, coal, and construction material. The port exports cereals that are produced in the area and has a silo capacity of 33,000 tons.

One of the two locks at the port of Ouistreham, at the mouth of the canal, can accommodate ships of more than 200-metre (660 ft) length.

Also at Blainville is a Renault Trucks manufacturing plant. The plant is across the canal from the town, to the southeast, between the canal and the Orne. Just across the river from the plant is the community of Colombelles.

The channel passes the side of the Château de Bénouville. The famous Pegasus Bridge (aka "Ham"), from D-Day, 6 June 1944, crossed the canal near the village of Bénouville. The canal was considered both tactically and strategically important during the opening phases of the Battle of Normandy, as it was located on the eastern flank of the Allied beachhead area. The bridge was replaced in 1994.

== Canal route ==
(From mouth to terminus)

- Ouistreham
- Bénouville
- Blainville-sur-Orne
- Colombelles
- Hérouville-Saint-Clair
- Caen

== See also ==
- List of canals in France
- Operation Tonga, the WWII D-Day airborne operation to capture Caen Canal bridges
