= Georges de Brébeuf =

French poet and translator

Georges de Brébeuf (French: [ʒɔʁʒ də bʁe.bœf]) (1618 – 1661) was a French poet and translator best known for his verse translation of Lucan's Pharsalia (1654) which was warmly received by Pierre Corneille, but which was ridiculed by Nicolas Boileau in his Art poétique.

== Biography ==
Georges de Brébeuf was born into an illustrious Norman family, most likely at Torigni-sur-Vire, Province of Normandy. One of his ancestors had followed William the Conqueror into England, and he was himself the nephew of the Jesuit missionary to Canada Jean de Brébeuf (who was later made a saint after his death at the hands of the Iroquois). He studied in Caen and Paris (where he met Blaise Pascal) and became preceptor to the future Marshall de Bellefonds (1641), then moved to Rouen, to hold a religious benefice.

His early poetry participated in the so-called "précieuses" movement and is considered on a par with the works of Vincent Voiture and Jean-Louis Guez de Balzac. He became friends with Valentin Conrart, Gilles Ménage, Jean Chapelain, François-Eudes de Mézeray and Pierre Corneille; he wrote poetry on demand; and he gained a reputation for his playful, elegant and ironic poems (such as his Gageure or Epigrammes contre une femme fardée, 150 epigrams and madrigals against a woman wearing make-up) and his skill with vers libre (free verse). He also wrote works in a burlesque vein, much like Paul Scarron, in his baroque parodies of Virgil's Aeneid and Lucan's Pharsalia.

His reputation is most linked to his non-burlesque free translation of Lucan's Pharsalia. The author was severely ridiculized by Nicolas Boileau for his precious language in his Art poétique, but Boileau later changed his opinion of Brébeuf, saying "Malgré son fatras obscur, souvent Brébeuf étincelle" ("Despite his obscure gobblygook, Brébeuf often shines").

Near the end of his life, Brébeuf left worldly society and retreated to Venoix (near Caen), where his younger brother was curé. His later works are meditative, and seek peace in contemplation and nature. He died in 1661 in Venoix near Caen. His brother published a posthumous collection of his works, including his letters.

== Works ==
- L'Enéide de Virgile en vers burlesques. Livre septiesme (a parody of the seventh book of Virgil's Aeneid, 1650)
- La Pharsale de Lucain... (a translation of Lucan's Pharsalia, 1654)
- Défense de l'église romaine (a defense of the Roman church, 1654)
- Lucain travesti en vers enjouëz (a parody of the seventh book of Lucan's Pharsalia, 1656)
- Poésies diverses (1658)
- Entretiens solitaires, ou prières et meeditations pieueses (1660)
- Panégyrique de la paix (1660)
- Éloges poétiques (1661, poems of praise for Nicolas Fouquet, Cardinal Mazarin, Louis XIV, the Battle of the Dunes (1658), Claude Auvry, etc.)
- Les œuvres de M. de Brébeuf (1664 – includes his letters)
- Poésies héroïques, gaillardes et amoureuses (1666)

== References and notes ==
This article is based in part on the article Georges de Brébeuf from the French Wikipedia, retrieved on October 7, 2006

- Dandrey, Patrick (1996). Dictionnaire des lettres françaises: le XVIIe siècle. Paris: Fayard. pp. 221–212. ISBN 2-253-05664-2.
- Departmental archives of the Manche
- Harmand, René (1897). Essai sur la vie et les œuvres de Georges de Brébeuf (1617 ?, 1661). Paris. pp. 12, 13, 14, 17, 18, 448, 449, 453, 454.
- G. Leroy, Imprimeur du Roi, ed. (1779). Nouveau dictionnaire historique. Vol. 1. Caen: Société de Gens-de-Lettres. pp. 548, 549.
- Marie, Charles (1875). Notice sur les trois Brébeuf. Société des Antiquaires de Normandie. pp. 7, 112.
- Robinne, J. (1949). L'Apôtre au cœur mangé. pp. 11, 12.
- Vapereau, Gustave (1876). Dictionnaire universel des littératures. Paris: Hachette. p. 322.
