= Parisii Quartet =

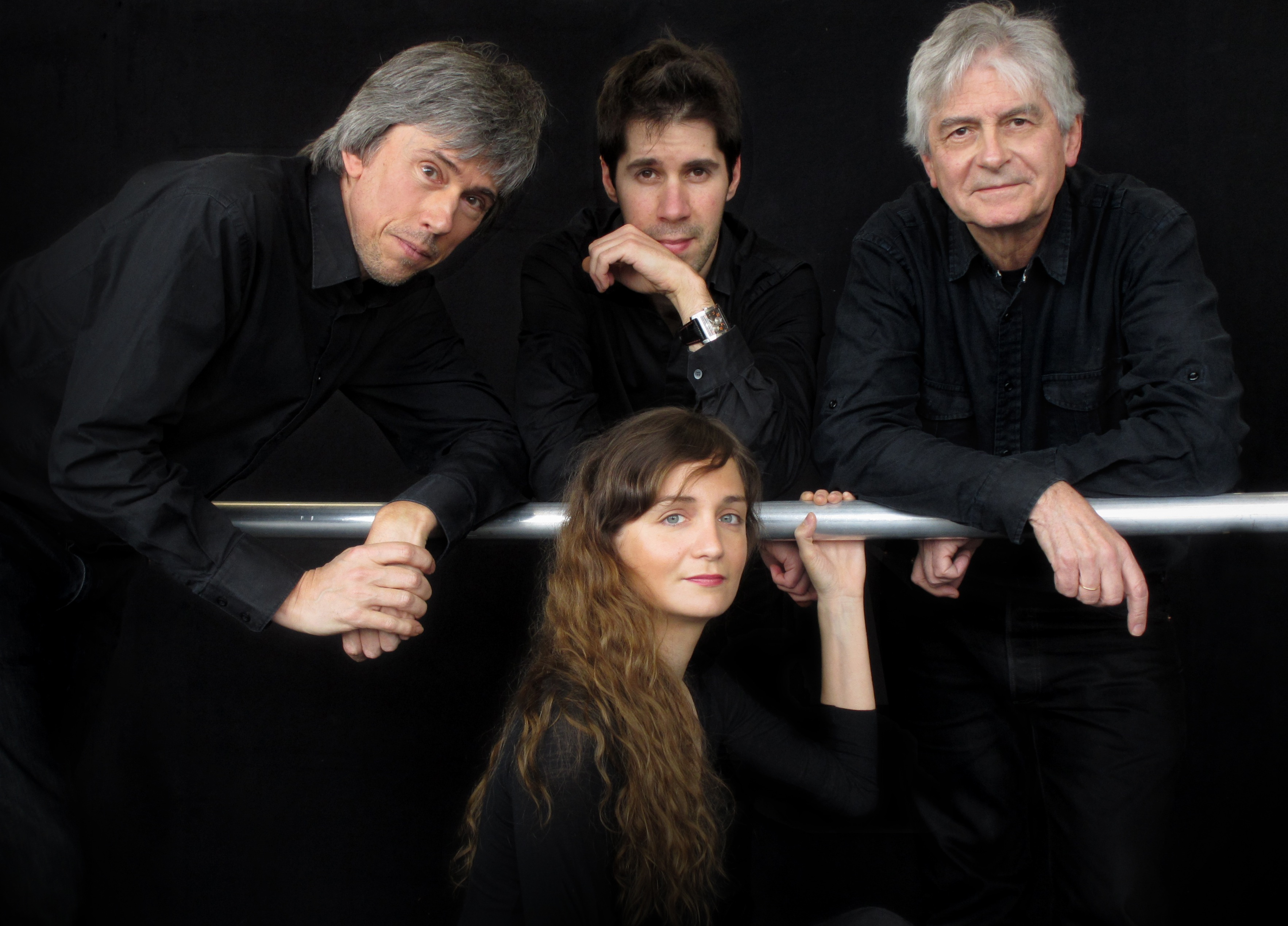

The Parisii Quartet is a French string quartet ensemble founded in 1981.

== Members ==
- Arnaud Vallin, first violin (2002-....) - Thierry Brodard (1981-2002)
- Doriane Gable (2013-....) second violin - Jean-Michel Berrette, (1981-2013)
- Dominique Lobet, viola (1981-....)
- Jean-Philippe Martignoni, cello (1981-....)

== History ==
The Parisii Quartet was created in 1981 by four students from the Conservatoire de Paris, all first prize in instrument and chamber music.

In 1986, the quartet won the Grand Prix Radio Canada in the Banff International Quartet Competition, a competition reserved for the top ten string quartets in the world, previously selected. Then in 1987, the formation won the Evian and Munich competitions.

Since then, the Parisii Quartet has performed regularly with chamber music societies. soloists such as Jean-Claude Pennetier, Régis Pasquier, Pascal Moraguès, Isabelle Moretti, Anne Queffélec and Michel Portal, joined the formation in the quintet repertoire.

== Repertoire ==
The repertoire of the Parisii Quartet is extensive, ranging from the 18th to the 21st century. Indeed, the four instrumentalists have often performed the premieres of contemporary pieces, both in France and abroad. Among these pieces are works by Pierre Boulez, Gilbert Amy, Régis Campo, Gérard Pesson, Guillaume Connesson, Laurent Lefrançois, Philippe Boivin, Garcia Roman, Tomás Marco, Richard Rodney Bennett, etc ... Their repertoire also includes works by Mozart, Beethoven, Brahms and Webern, not to mention the French music of the 20th century, with Franck, Fauré, Vierne, Debussy, Ravel and also Milhaud.

== Discography ==
Among their recordings are the quintets with oboe by Boccherini, or the world premiere recording of the Quartet Book by Boulez (complete Boulez box set at Deutsche Grammophon). Their discography also includes many complete quartets such as those of Beethoven, Brahms, Webern and Milhaud.

Their recordings of the quartets of Debussy and Ravel have been ranked ffff by Télérama and Choc by Le Monde de la musique, also distinguished by the prize for the new academy of music for the Franck and Webern CD. More recently, their recording of the string quartets and piano quintet of Reynaldo Hahn has been unanimously hailed by critics.
