= Corinne Lagache =

French footballer (born 1975)

Personal information
- Date of birth: 9 December 1975 (age 50)
- Place of birth: Caen, France
- Height: 1.70 m (5 ft 7 in)
- Position: Goalkeeper

Senior career*
Years	Team	Apps	(Gls)
1992–1997	ES Cormelles		
1997–2010	La Roche ESOF		

International career
1998–2001	France	27	
- * Club domestic league appearances and goals

Corinne Lagache (born 9 December 1975) is a French footballer who played as a goalkeeper for the France women's national football team. She was part of the team at the UEFA Women's Euro 2001. On club level she played for La Roche ESOF in France.

== Career ==
1997-2010 ES Cormelles (french:Entente sportive Cormelles-le-Royal)

1997-2010 La Roche ESOF (French: Etoile Sportive Ornaysienne de Football Vendée La Roche-sur-Yon)
