= Étienne Mélingue =

French sculptor

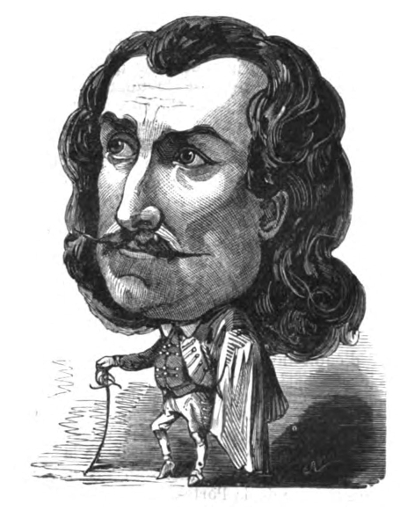
Portrait of Étienne Mélingue published in Le Trombinscope, by Touchatout, in 1872

Étienne Marin Mélingue (1807–1875) was a French actor, sculptor and painter.

He was born in Caen, the son of a volunteer of 1792. He went to Paris at an early age and obtained work as a sculptor on the church of the Madeleine, but his passion for the stage soon led him to join a strolling company of comedians. Finally chance gave him an opportunity to show his talents, and at the Porte Saint Martin he became the popular interpreter of romantic drama of the type popularized by Alexandre Dumas, père.

One of his greatest successes was as Benvenuto Cellini, in which he displayed his ability both as an actor and as a sculptor, really modelling before the eyes of the audience a statue of Hebe. He sent a number of statuettes to the various exhibitions, notably one of Gilbert Louis Duprez as William Tell. Mélingue's wife, Théodorine Thiesset (1813–1886), was the actress selected by Victor Hugo to create the part of Guanhumara in Burgraves at the Comédie-Française, where she remained ten years. He created the part of D'Artagnan in The Youth of The Musketeers and The Musketeer (a dramatization of 20 Years After by Dumas) and also the part of Lagardere in Feval and Anciet-Bourgeois's Hunchback.

== External links and reference ==
- Dumas, Une Vie d'artiste; Aventures et tribulations d'un comédien (1854).
- Étienne Mélingue caricature
