= Isabelle Moretti =

French classical harpist

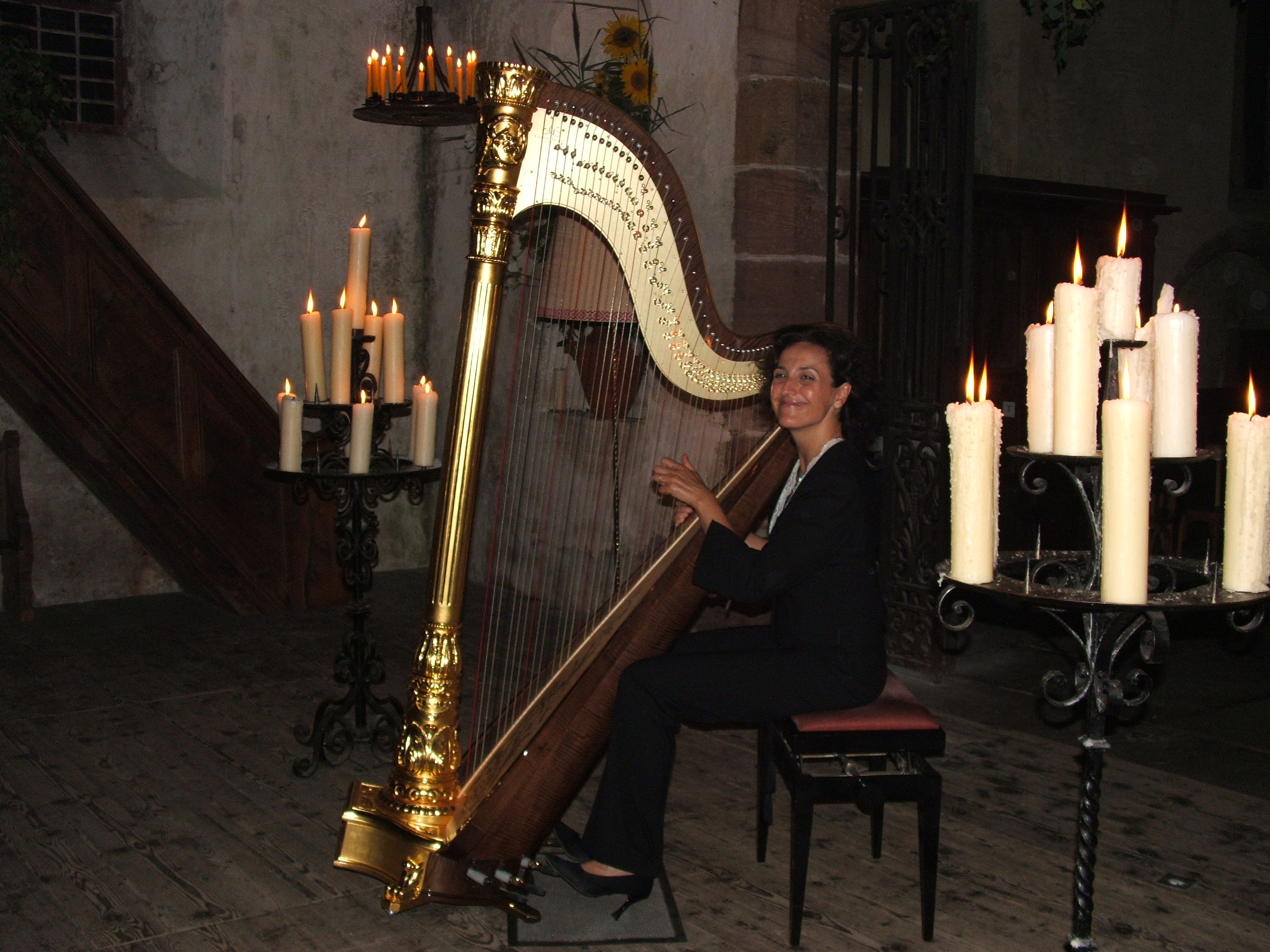
Isabelle Moretti in 2007

Isabelle Moretti (born 5 May 1964 in Lyon) is a French classical harpist.

== Biography ==
Moretti studied harp at the Conservatoire de Lyon, then at the Conservatoire de Paris where she is a teacher.

In 2006, she premiered the harp concertos by Philippe Hersant and Michèle Reverdy.

In 2007, Moretti played "La Source" by Alphonse Hasselmans in the episode "Les Sons de la nature" of Jean-François Zygel's TV program La boîte à musique.

In 2015, she performed the Polish premiere of Karol Beffa's Concerto pour harpe.

== Selected discography ==
- Sonates pour harpe by Casella, C.P.E. Bach, Dussek, Hindemith, Tailleferre, Harmonia Mundi, 1987.
- Ravel, Debussy, Caplet, Cras, Musique de chambre pour harpe, with the Parisii Quartet, Michel Moraguès (flute), Pascal Moraguès (clarinet), Dominique Desjardin (double bass), Auvidis Valois, 1995.
- André Caplet, Le Miroir de Jésus, Inscriptions champêtres, with the Quatuor Ravel, Michel Chanu, Hanna Schaer, female choir Bernard Têtu directed by Bernard Têtu, Musidisc Accord, 1996.
- Joaquín Rodrigo, Concierto serenata, with the Real Orquesta Sinfónica de Sevilla directed by Edmon Colomer, Auvidis Valois, 1999.
- Alberto Ginastera, Concerto pour harpe, with the Orchestre national de Lyon directed by David Robertson, Naïve Records, 2000 (Prix Charles Cros en 2001)
- Witold Lutosławski, Double concerto pour hautbois et harpe, with François Leleux (oboe) and the Sinfonietta Cracovia directed by Robert Kabara, Arion, 2004.
- Cantare, La voix de la Harpe, with Felicity Lott, Naïve Records, 2009.

== Awards ==
- 1996: Victoire de la musique, classical, new talent.
- 2001: Prize of the Académie Charles-Cros for the Concierto serenata by Rodrigo
- 2007: She is made a Chevalier of the Ordre national du Mérite
