= Jean-Yves Marin =

Jean Yves Marin
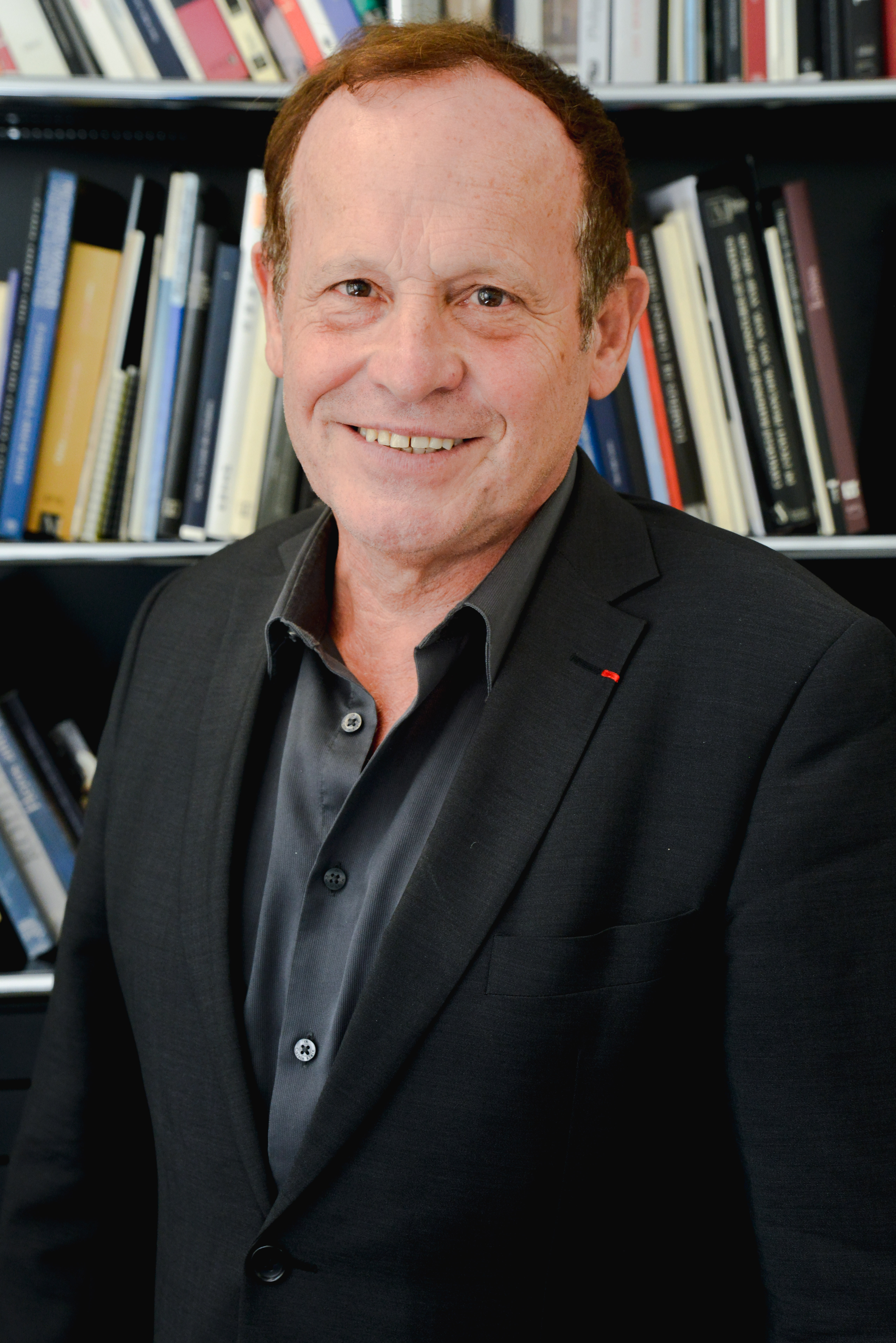
- Born: 1955 (age 70–71); Caen, France
- Occupation: Museum director
- Employer: Musée d'art et d'histoire de Genève

Jean-Yves Marin is an archeologist, medievalist and chief curator of French heritage. He was born in Caen in 1955.

== Biography ==
Jean-Yves Marin was educated in Caen and specialized in medieval urban archeology. Initially a municipal archaeologist from Caen, he managed numerous excavation sites and became a curator, then director of the Musée de Normandie until 2009. In 2009, he was appointed by the cultural minister of the town of Geneva Patrice Mugny as director of the Geneva Museum of Art and History (MAH) and its various sites - the Rath Museum, the Tavel House, the Graphic Arts Office and the Library of Art and Archeology. His task was notably defending the restoration and extension project by Jean Nouvel together with a public-private partnership with the oil magnate Jean-Claude Gandur. These plans were though rejected together with a museological project he presented shortly before the referendum on February 28, 2016, by the Genevan population. Since, he participated as one of the consultants in the elaboration of a new project by a group of extern experts under the direction of Jacques Hainard, the former director of the ethnographic museum in Geneva and the Musée d'ethnographie de Neuchâtel, and Roger Mayou, the former director of the International Red Cross and Red Crescent Museum in Geneva. Marin is also:

- Member of the Scientific Council of the Cité du Vin in Bordeaux
- Member of the Steering Committee for the renovation of the Musée de l'Homme in Paris
- Member of the Scientific Council of the Memorial for Peace in Caen

Jean-Yves Marin is also an associate professor at Senghor University in Alexandria since 1996 and teaches in various European universities, including a course on ethics, a subject for which his expertise is internationally recognized. He is regularly solicited to participate in international symposia on this theme, as a speaker or organizer. The most recent one took place in Geneva in December 2016 for the 30 years of the International Council of Museums code of ethics. He is a member of the Scientific Council of the Master of Advanced Studies (MAS) in the conservation of the heritage and museology of the University of Geneva. He joined the International Council of Museums (ICOM) at an early stage and became chairman of the French committee (1992-1998), then president of the International Committee of Museums of Archeology and History (1998-2004), as well as Member of the International Committee on Museum Ethics (1998-2004). From 2010 to 2016, he directed the project of renovation and expansion of the Museum of Art and History of Geneva entrusted to the Atelier Jean Nouvel and drafted a scientific and cultural project. Since the refusal of the project by referendum in February 2016, he participated in the setting up of a new project.

== Exhibits ==
Jean-Yves Marin, who is the director of the museum network at the Geneva Museum of Art and History, coordinates the exhibition program, and in this context intern or extern curators of the museum have elaborated some fifty exhibitions, including:

- "The subjects of abstraction" (Rath Museum - 2011)
- "Watchmaking in Geneva" (Rath Museum - 2011/2012)
- "Heroes Antiques" (Museum of art and history -2013/2014)
- "Courbet, the Swiss years" (Musée Rath - 2014/2015)
- "Byzantium in Switzerland" (Rath Museum - 2015/2016)
- "Becoming Swiss" (Maison Tavel - 2015/2016)
- "Jean-Pierre Saint-Ours" (Museum of art and history - 2015/2016)

During his mandates as curator and director of the Musée de Normandie, he has also elaborated numerous regional and international exhibitions on Norman history including:

- "The barbarians and the sea. Migrations of the peoples of north-west Europe from the 5th to the 10th century" (Caen 1992)
- "I Normanni popolo d'Europa. 1030-1200 "(Rome - Venice 1993)
- "The Wings of God" (Bari - Caen 2000)
- "The Normans in Sicily. XI-XXI centuries. History and legends "(Caen 2006)
- "Masterpieces of the Gothic in Normandy. Sculpture and goldsmithing from the 13th to the 15th century "(Caen - Toulouse 2008)

Since his arrival at the MAH, Jean-Yves Marin has developed a national and international policy for exhibiting the collections of the Museum of Art and History, building on a major public-private partnership. This policy was particularly successful with the "Geneva at the Heart of Time" exhibition, which was awarded in China in May 2016, winning the Best Cooperation Award for Best International Exhibitions in China.

== Publications ==
Jean-Yves Marin is the author of fifty articles and reviews of archaeological excavations (Annales de Normandie, Gallia, Medieval Archeology) and numerous contributions in exhibition catalogs.

- "Representation of Europe in exhibitions" in Museum International No. 211, 2001.
- "What is history museum in Europe today? "In The issues and challenges or urban history museums, Seoul, 2003.
- "The Status of Human Remains, International Claims in Cultural Heritage, L'Harmattan, Paris, 2008.
- "Making Colonial Heritage" in Museums and Public Collections of France No. 254, 2008.

He participated in the drafting of the ICOM code of ethics published in 2007. Jean-Yves Marin is also the author of many forums in the French newspapers Le Monde, La Croix et Le Figaro and in the Swiss newspapers Le Temps and La Tribune de Genève. He directs the publication of catalogs of exhibitions and catalogs of the MAH and manages the publication of the annual magazine Genava, which from 2017 will be published exclusively in digital version.

== Distinctions ==
- Knight of the Legion of Honor (2009)
- Special Prize for the History of Art of the Regional Assembly of Sicily and the Siculo-Normandy Academy (1997)
- Officer of the National Order of Merit (2015)
