= Canton of Caen-5 =

Coordinates: 49.18°N 0.36°W

- Canton
- Situation of the canton of Caen-5 in the department of Calvados
- Country: France
- Region: Normandy
- Department: Calvados
- No. of communes: {{{nbcomm}}}
- Population (2023): 28,570
- INSEE code: 1409

The canton of Caen-5 is an administrative division of the Calvados department, northwestern France. Its borders were modified at the French canton reorganisation which came into effect in March 2015. Its seat is in Caen.

It consists of the following communes:

1. Caen (partly)
2. Éterville
3. Fleury-sur-Orne
4. Louvigny
5. Saint-André-sur-Orne
