= Hôtel de Ville, Caen =

Town hall in Caen, France

Hôtel de Ville
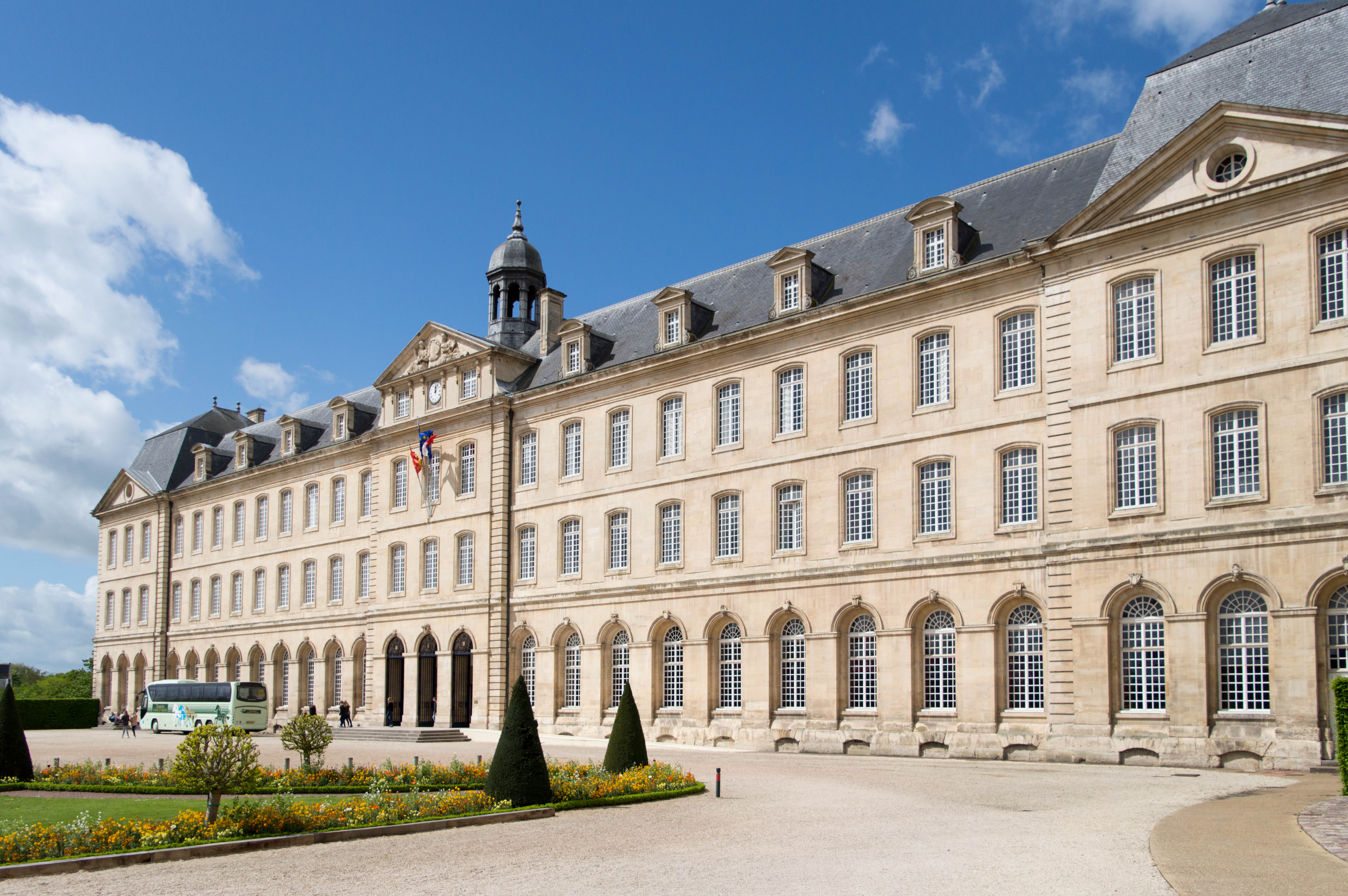
- The main frontage of the Hôtel de Ville in May 2015
- Interactive map of the Hôtel de Ville area

General information
- Type: City hall
- Architectural style: Neoclassical style
- Location: Caen, France
- Coordinates: 49.1812°N 0.3728°W
- Completed: 1726

Design and construction
- Architect: Guillaume de la Tremblaye

The Hôtel de Ville (French pronunciation: [otɛl də vil], City Hall) is a municipal building in Caen, Calvados, north-west France, standing on the Esplanade Jean-Marie Louvel.

== History ==
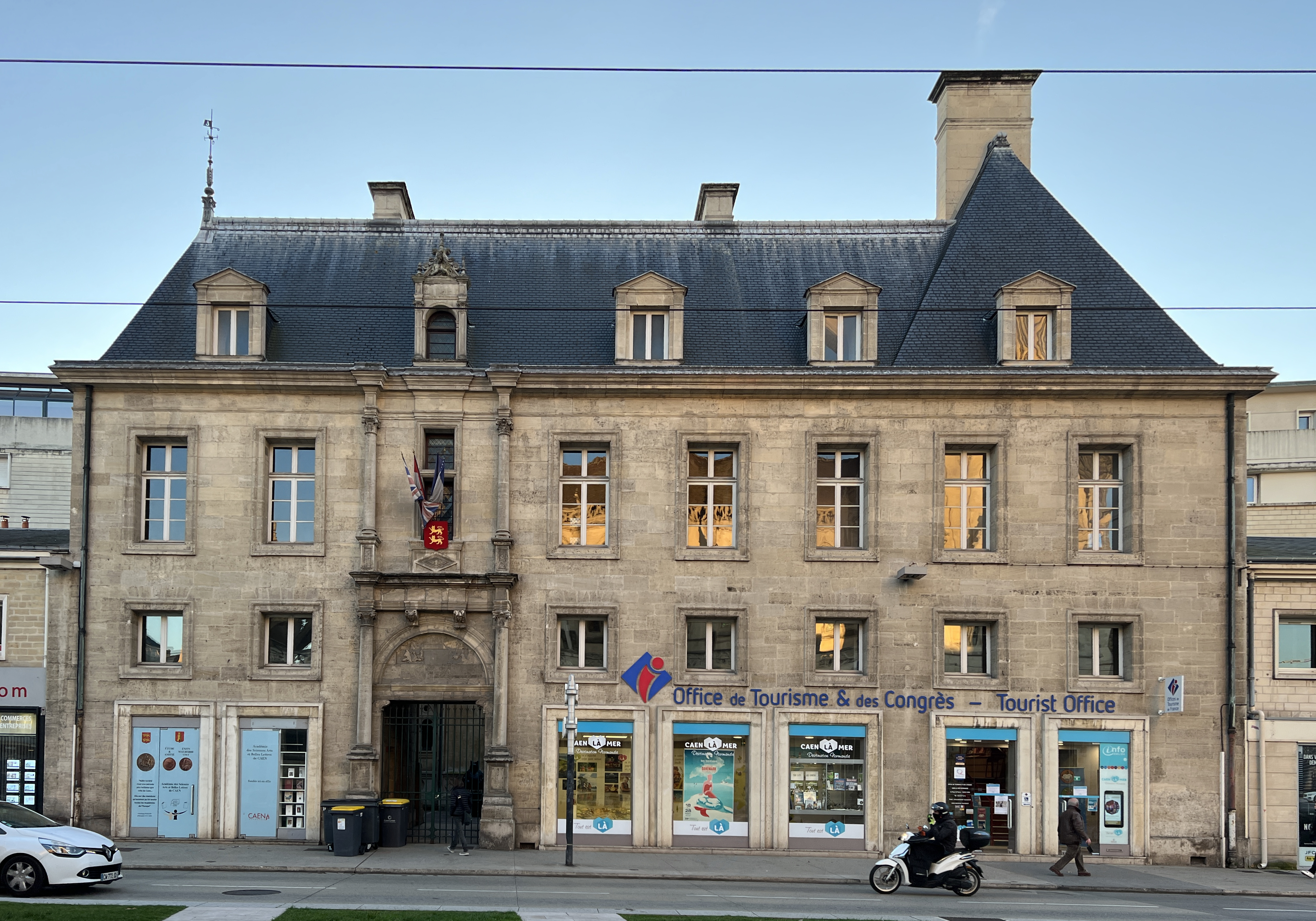
The Hôtel d'Escoville

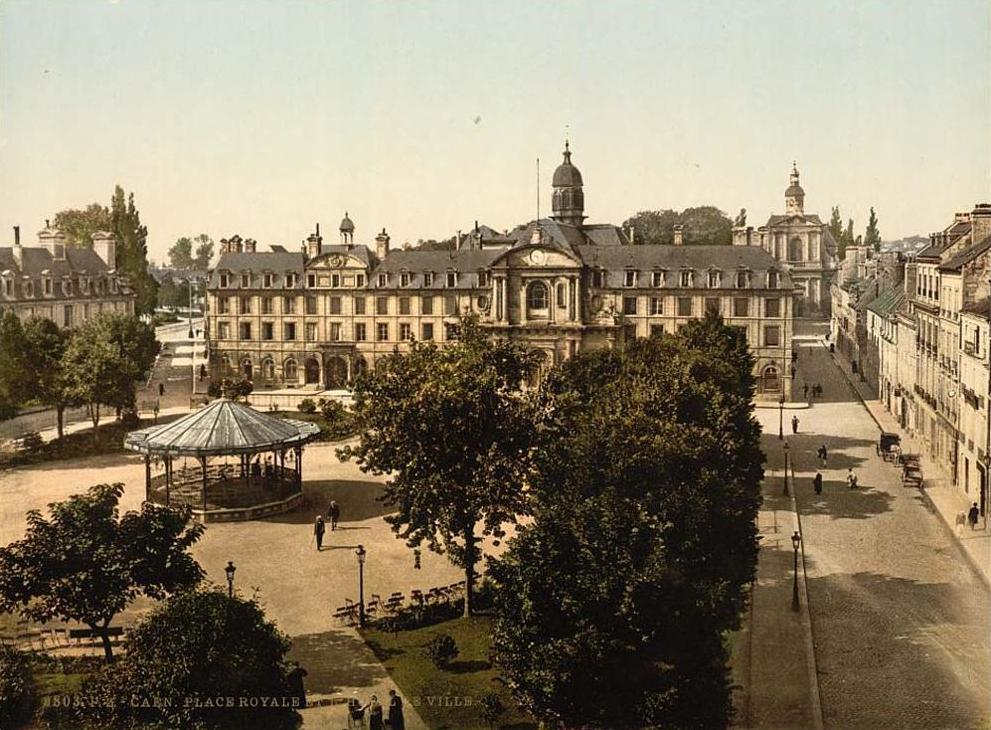
The Séminaire des Eudistes

Early meetings of the local council were held in the square tower at the Châtelet, which dated back at least to the early 14th century, and was located on the bridge across the River Orne, close to what is now the junction between the Boulevard Maréchal Leclerc and the Rue Saint-Jean.

In the late 17th century, the council sought a dedicated building and selected the Hôtel d'Escoville on Place Saint-Pierre, which was designed in the Renaissance style for Nicolas le Valois d'Escoville and completed in 1537. The council rented the building from 1693, before acquiring it in 1733.

In the late 18th century, the council decided that it needed a more substantial building and identified the Séminaire des Eudistes on the Place Royale (now known as the Place de la République): the building had its origins in a church commissioned by Jean Eudes. The seminary, created to support the church, was designed in the French neoclassical style and was completed in 1703. It was seized by revolutionaries during the French Revolution, and was then acquired by the council in January 1792. After being converted for municipal use, it was extended with extra wings along Rue Auber, Rue Saint-Laurent and Rue Jean Eudes around an inner courtyard. The complex was completely destroyed by allied bombing in the Battle for Caen in June 1944 during the Second World War.

After the war, the council sought a new municipal headquarters. The building they selected had originally served as the south transept of the Abbey of Saint-Étienne. It had been designed by a monk, Guillaume de la Tremblaye, and completed in 1726. The design involved a symmetrical main frontage of 27 bays facing onto what became the Esplanade Jean-Marie Louvel, with the end sections slightly projected forward. The main frontage was 105 metres (344 ft) long. The central section of three bays featured three round headed openings on the ground floor, three segmental headed windows on the first floor, and three smaller segmental headed windows on the second floor. There was a clock flanked by two square headed windows at attic level, all surmounted by a pediment with carvings in the tympanum and a lantern behind. The wings and the end sections were fenestrated in a similar style to the central section.

After the French Revolution, the building became the headquarters of the department of Calvados as well as the local gendarmerie and then became home to the Lycée Impérial in 1804. The Lycée Impérial was renamed the Lycée Malherbe in 1892, and relocated to new premises in Avenue Albert Sorel in 1961. The vacant building was acquired by the council and, following conversion for municipal use, re-opened as the town hall in January 1965. The area in front of the building was renamed Esplanade Jean-Marie Louvel to commemorate the life of the former mayor, Jean-Marie Louvel.
