= Laurent Lefrançois =

French composer (born 1974)

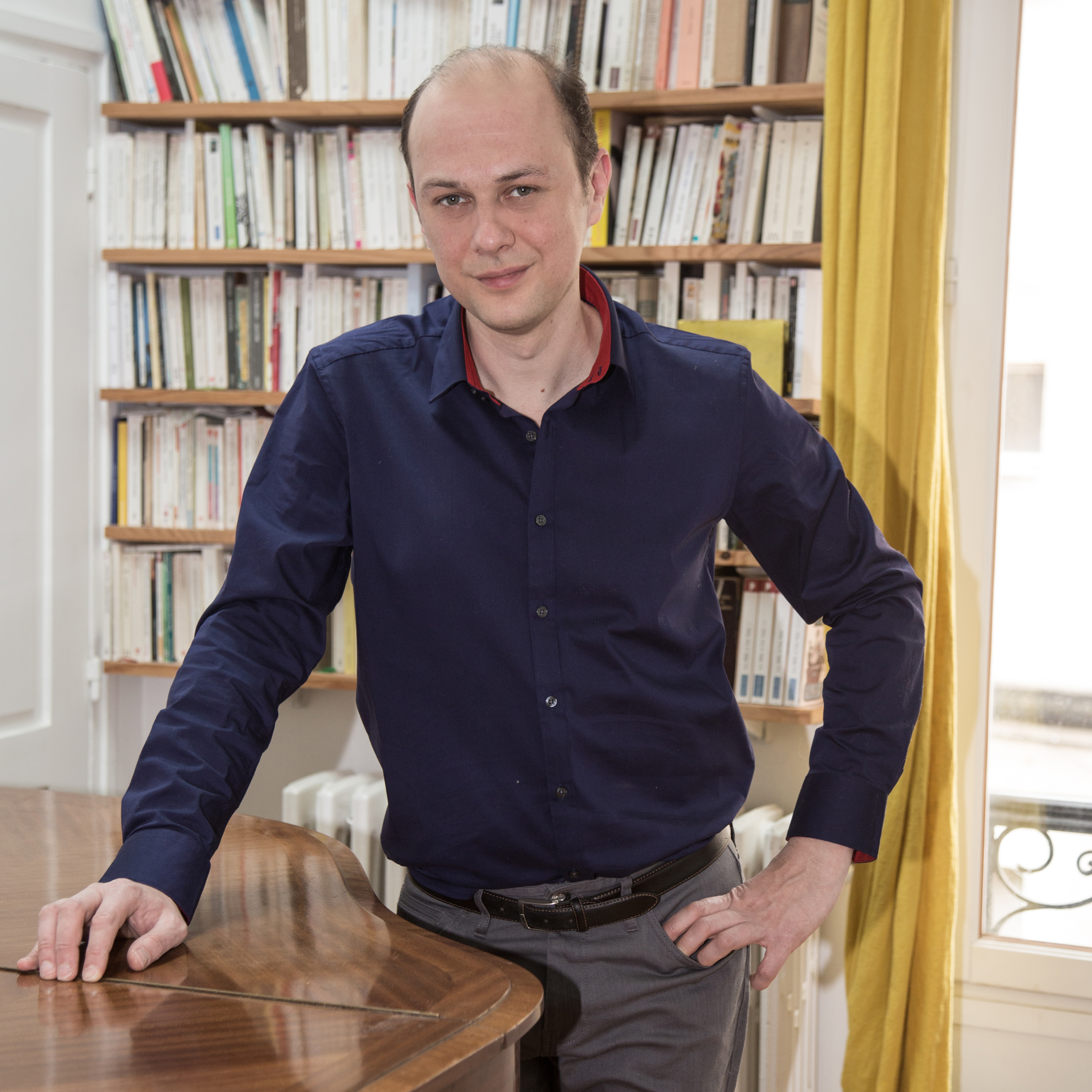
Laurent Lefrançois in 2016

Laurent Lefrançois (born in 1974 in Caen) is a French composer.

== Life ==
Winner of the Claude Arrieu Prize of the Sacem in 2016 and public prize at the international competition for young composers in Boulogne in 2006 (with Philippe Hersant as president of the jury), Lefrançois graduated from the École normale de musique de Paris in orchestration and musical composition in Michel Merlet's class. He studied harmony and counterpoint with Stéphane Delplace and composition with Guillaume Connesson.

Lefrançois received commissions from the Festival Présences in 2004, from Les Concerts de Radio France for the Alternance Ensemble, from ProQuartet in 2006, for the Modigliani Quartet and Lise Berthaud, from 'Alla breve at Radio France, from the Festival de Radio France et Montpellier in 2007, for the pianist Cyril Guillotin, from the Festival international de musique de Salon-de-Provence in 2009, for Ria Ideta and Paul Meyer, from the Conservatoire de Douai orchestra in 2014 under the baton of Frédéric Lodéon and from Musique nouvelle en liberté in 2016 for clarinetist Paul Meyer and the Rouen Orchestra.

== Works ==
- Sextuor, commission from Radio France for the Festival Présences 2004
- Erinnerung, sextet for string instruments, commission from Proquartet
- Padouk Phantasticus for strings, commission from the Festival international de musique de Salon-de-Provence, 2009.

== Discography ==
- Balnéaire Chamber Music, monography, label Evidence, 2014.
