= Venoix =

Coordinates: 49°10′28″N 0°23′45″W

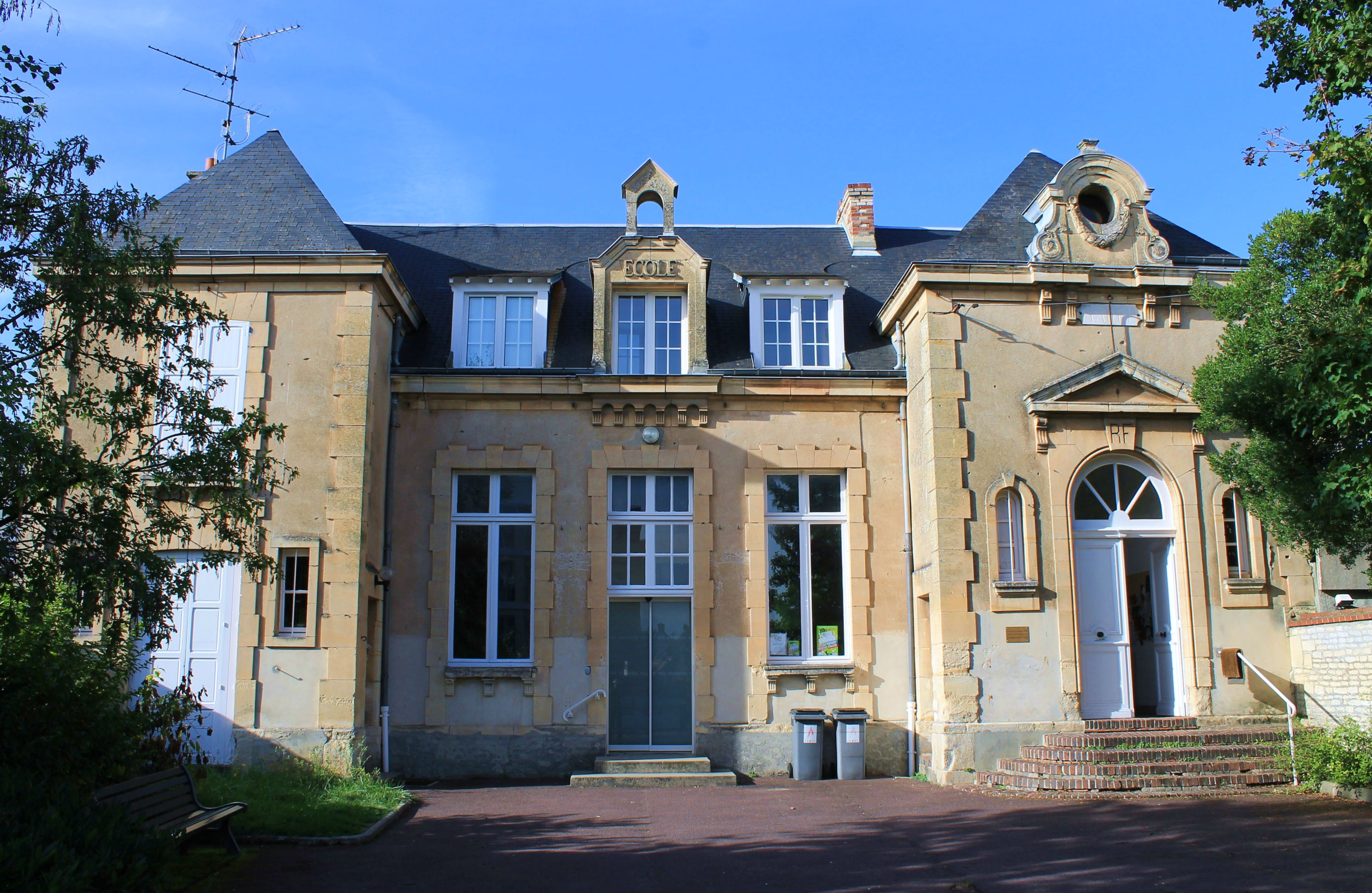
Venoix Town Hall

Venoix is a western quarter of Caen, in Calvados, France. It was an independent commune until 1952, when it merged with Caen. Venoix is over 300 years old. Its inhabitants still keep today a distinctly specific feeling of living in Venoix rather than in Caen.
