= Caen =

Caen Kaem (Norman)
- Prefecture and commune
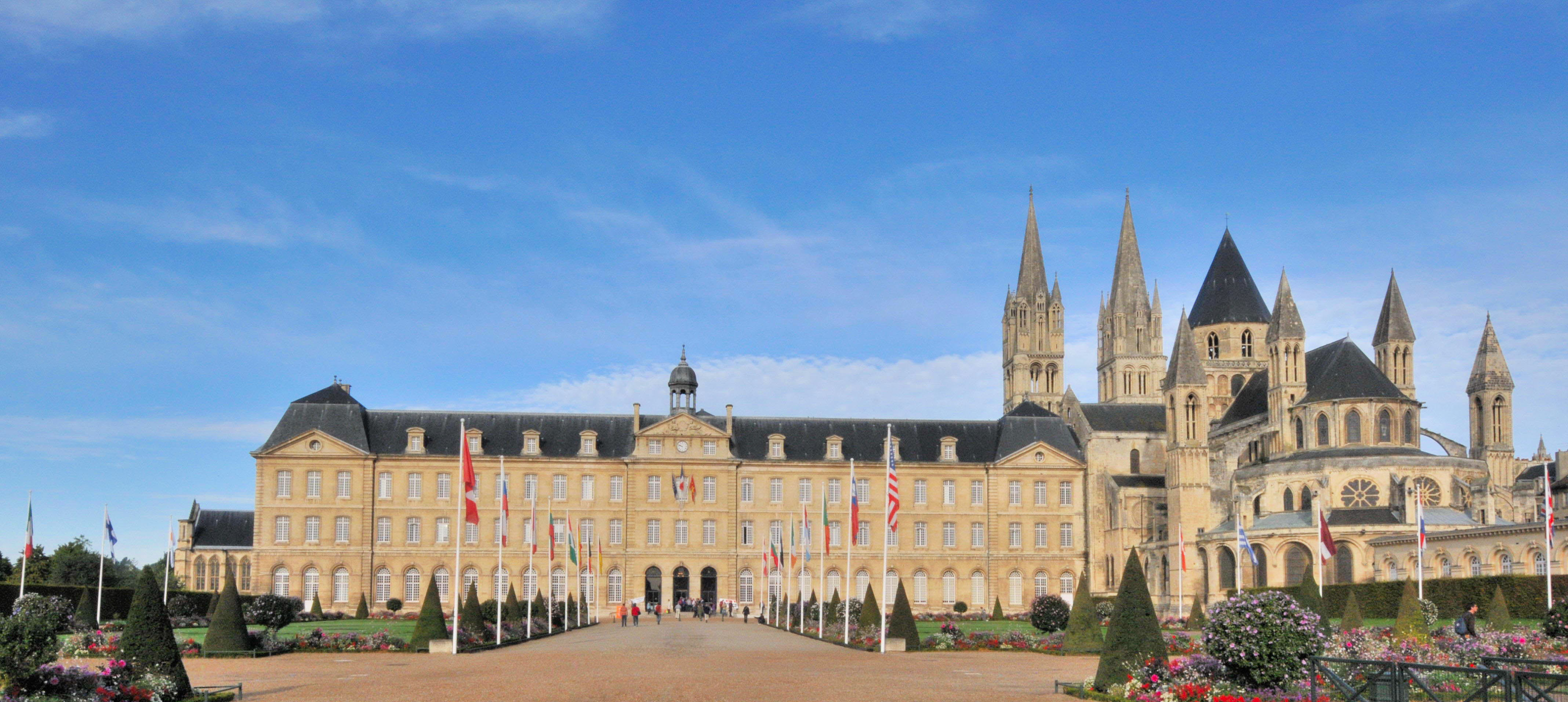
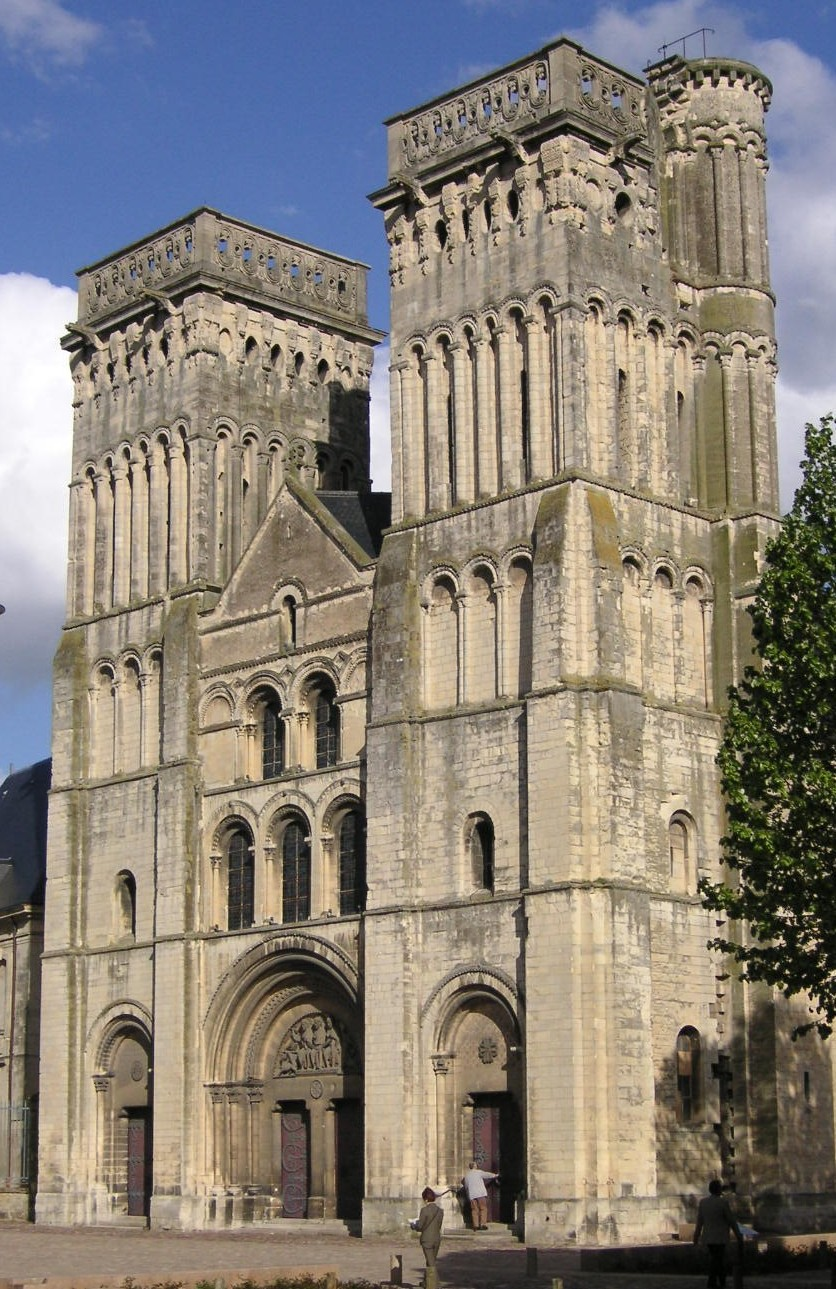
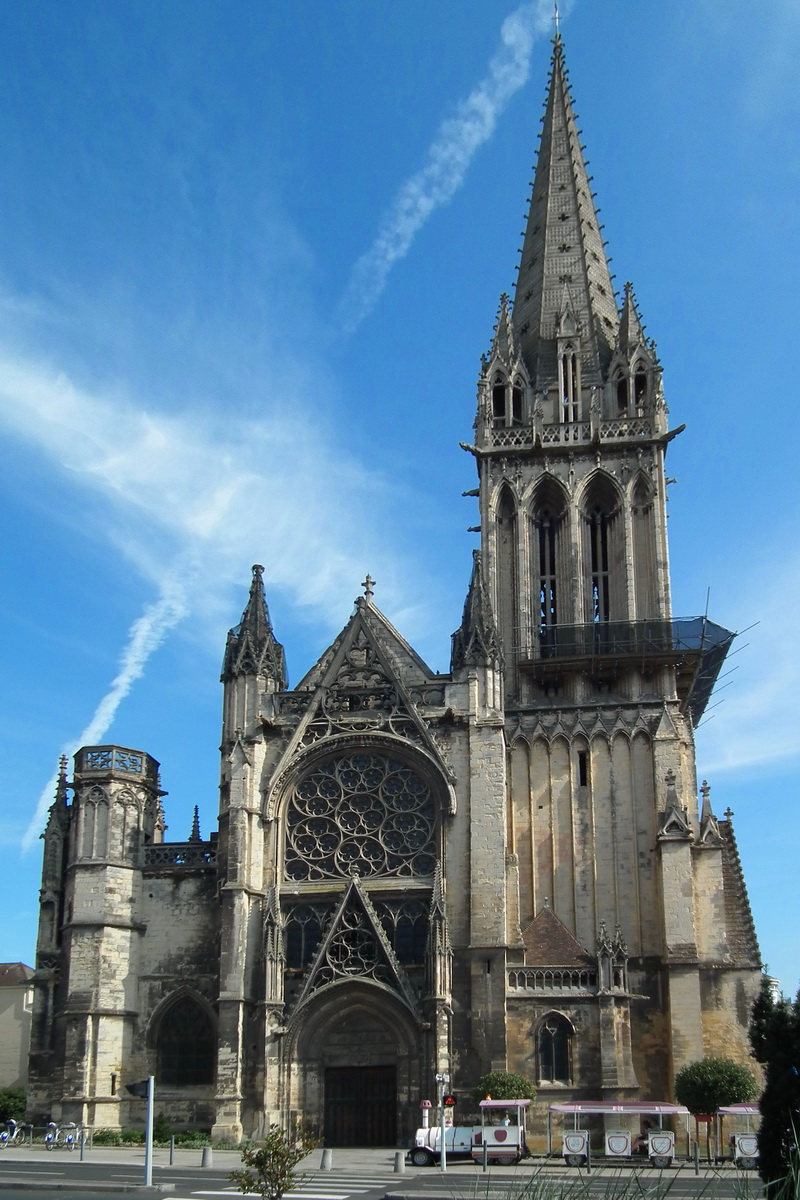
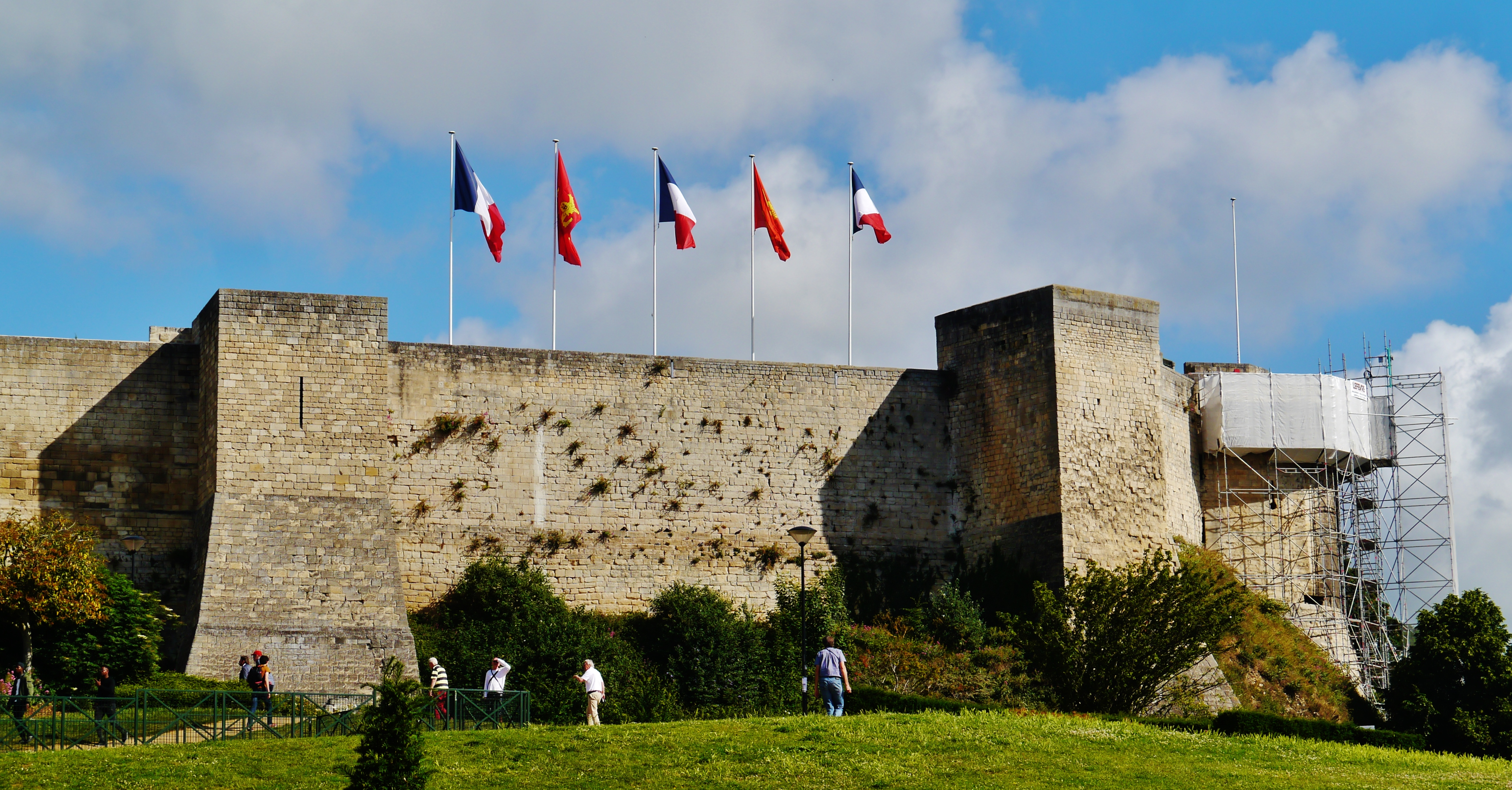
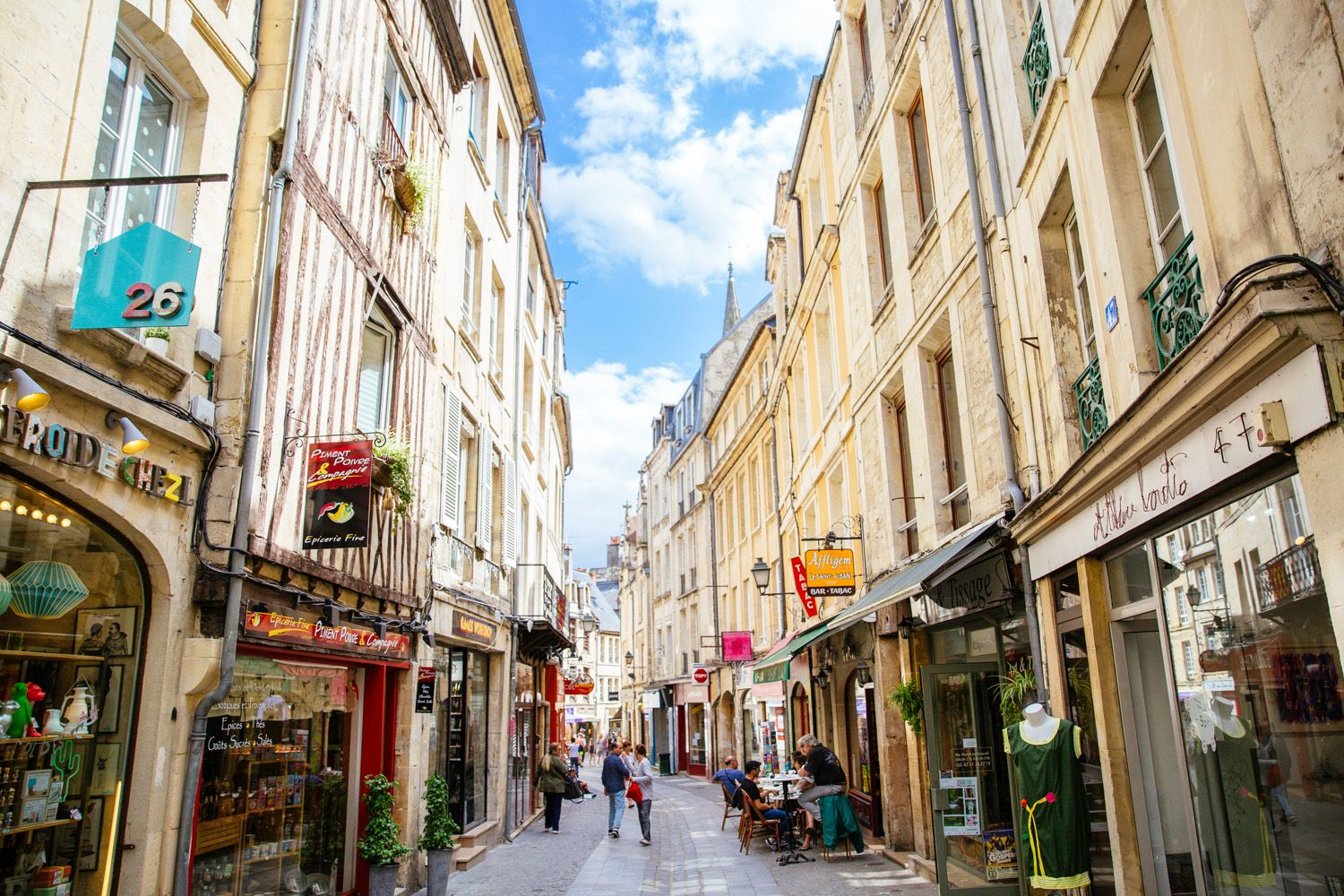
- Hôtel de Ville and Abbaye aux Hommes Abbaye aux Dames Saint-Pierre Church Château de Caen Rue Froide in Caen old town

- Coat of arms
- Location of Caen
- Location within France Location within Normandy
- Coordinates: 49°10′53″N 00°21′49″W
- Country: France
- Region: Normandy
- Department: Calvados
- Arrondissement: Caen
- Canton: Caen-1, 2, 3, 4 and 5
- Intercommunality: Caen la Mer

Government
  - Mayor (2026–32): Aristide Olivier
- Area^{1}: 25.70 km^{2} (9.92 sq mi)
  - Urban: 173.6 km^{2} (67.0 sq mi)
  - Metro: 2,597 km^{2} (1,003 sq mi)
- Elevation: 8 m (26 ft)
- Highest elevation: 73 m (240 ft)
- Lowest elevation: 2 m (6.6 ft)
- Population (2023): 109,400
  - Density: 4,257/km^{2} (11,030/sq mi)
  - Urban (2018): 205,708
  - Urban density: 1,185/km^{2} (3,069/sq mi)
  - Metro (2018): 469,526
  - Metro density: 180.8/km^{2} (468.3/sq mi)
- Demonym: Caennais
- Time zone: UTC+01:00 (CET)
  - Summer (DST): UTC+02:00 (CEST)
- INSEE/Postal code: 14118 /14000
- Website: caen.fr
- ^{1} French Land Register data, which excludes lakes, ponds, glaciers > 1 km^{2} (0.386 sq mi or 247 acres) and river estuaries.

Caen (/kɒ̃/ or /kɒn/; French: [kɑ̃]; Norman: Kaem) is a city and commune 15 km (9.3 mi) inland from the northwestern coast of France. It is the prefecture of the department of Calvados. The city proper has 105,512 inhabitants (as of 2018), while its functional urban area has 470,000, making Caen the second largest urban area in Normandy and the 19th largest in France. It is also the third largest commune in all of Normandy after Le Havre and Rouen.

Caen is located 200 km (120 mi) northwest of Paris, connected to the South of England by the Caen (Ouistreham) to Portsmouth ferry route through the English Channel. Situated a few kilometres from the coast, the landing beaches, the bustling resorts of Deauville and Cabourg, as well as Norman Switzerland and the Pays d'Auge, Caen is often considered the archetype of Normandy.

Caen is known for its historical buildings built during the reign of William the Conqueror, who was buried there, and for the Battle for Caen, heavy fighting that took place in and around Caen during the Battle of Normandy in 1944, destroying much of the city. The city has now preserved the memory by erecting a memorial and a museum dedicated to peace, the Mémorial de Caen.

== Etymology ==
The first references to the name of Caen are found in different acts of the dukes of Normandy: Cadon 1021/1025, Cadumus 1025, Cathim 1026/1027. Year 1070 of the Parker manuscript of the Anglo-Saxon Chronicle refers to Caen as Kadum, and year 1086 of the Laud manuscript gives the name as Caþum. Despite a lack of sources as to the origin of the settlements, the name Caen would seem to be of Gaulish origin, from the words catu-, referring to military activities and magos, field, hence meaning "manoeuvre field" or "battlefield". In Layamon's Brut, the poet asserts that King Arthur named the city in memory of Sir Kay, although the historicity of King Arthur is widely doubted.

== History ==
=== Early history ===
Caen was known in Roman times as 'Catumagos', from the Gaulish roots magos meaning 'field' and catu meaning 'combat'. It remained a minor settlement throughout the Roman period.

In 912 Caen became the western capital of the Duchy of Normandy and due to the patronage of the Dukes of Normandy saw a major development of commence throughout the 10th century. Around 1060, William the Conqueror began construction of the Château de Caen, which became the centre of the ducal court. Duchess Matilda of Flanders also founded the Benedictine Abbey of Sainte-Trinité, Caen around the same time, eventually being buried in the abbey. Caen succeeded Bayeux as the capital of Lower Normandy, complementing the second ducal capital of Rouen.

Caen fell to Philip II of France on 21 May 1204, and was incorporated along with the remainder of Normandy into the Kingdom of France.

=== Hundred Years' War ===
In 1346, King Edward III of England led his army against the city, hoping to loot it. It was expected that a siege of perhaps several weeks would be required, but the army took the city in less than a day, on 26 July 1346, storming and sacking it, killing 3,000 of its citizens, and burning much of the merchants' quarter on the Île St-Jean. Only the castle of Caen held out, despite attempts to besiege it. A few days later, the English left, marching to the east and on to their victory at the Battle of Crécy. It was later captured following a siege by Henry V in 1417 and treated harshly for being the first town to put up any resistance to his invasion. In 1450 towards the end of the war, French forces recaptured Caen.

=== World War II ===
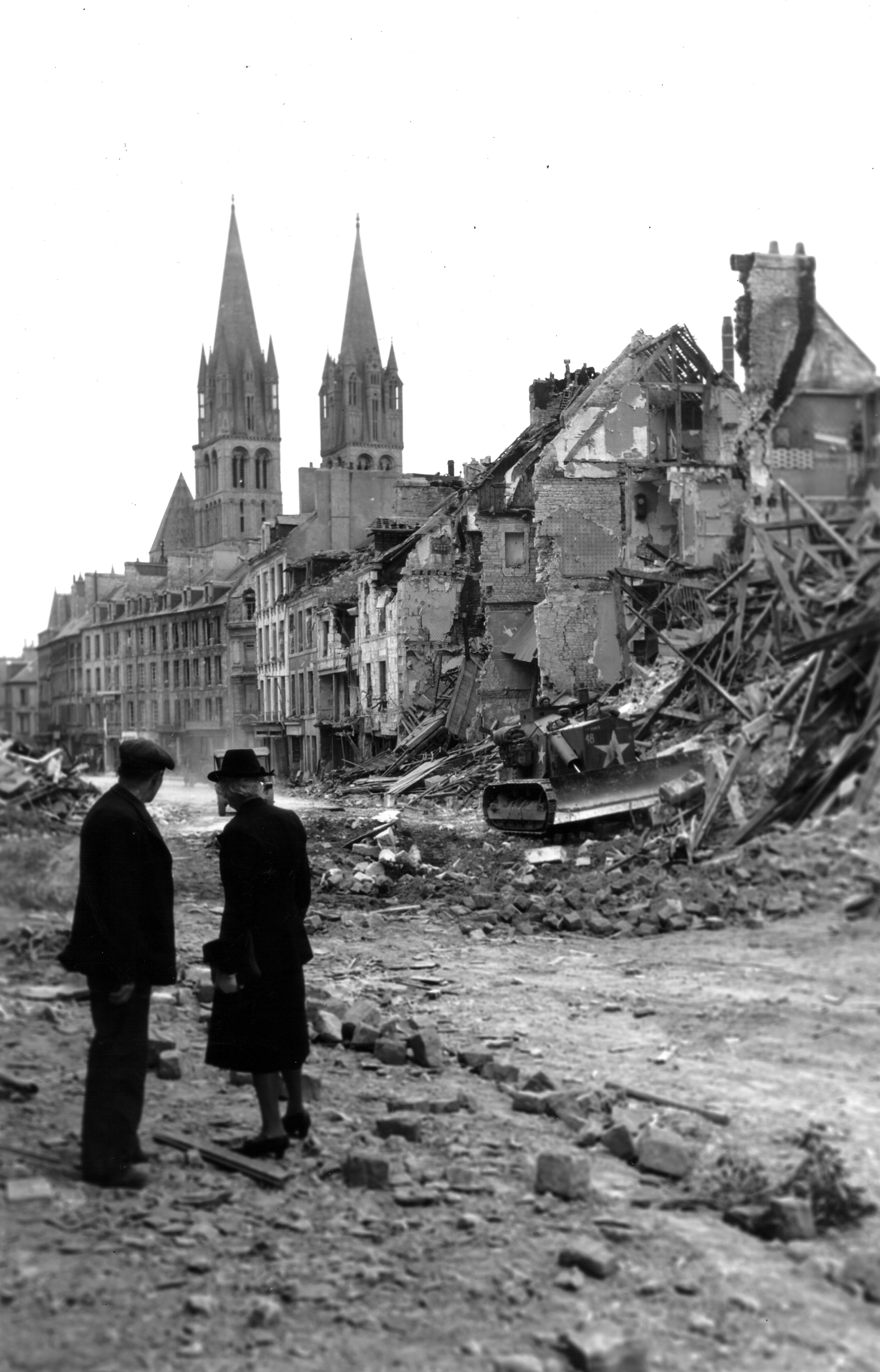
A Canadian Army bulldozer in Caen, 1944. The towers of the Abbaye aux Hommes are behind.

During World War II, Caen was captured by German forces during the Battle of France in 1940 and placed under military occupation. In 1944, Allied forces launched Operation Overlord, invading German-occupied France and rapidly advancing through Normandy. From 6 June to 6 August 1944, the British Second Army fought the battle of Caen to dislodge German forces from the city. During the battle, Allied bombing raids heavily damaged the city and caused numerous French civilian casualties. After the battle, little of prewar Caen remained, and reconstruction efforts in the city continued until 1962.

=== Postwar ===
Postwar work included the reconstruction of complete districts of the city and the university campus. It took 14 years (1948–1962) and led to the current urbanization of Caen. Having lost many of its historic quarters and its university campus in the war, Caen does not have the atmosphere of a traditional Norman town such as Honfleur, Rouen, Cabourg, Deauville or Bayeux.

The Canadian Army Film and Photo Unit filmed the D-Day offensive and Orne breakout several weeks later. It returned several months later to document the city's recovery efforts. The resulting film, You Can't Kill a City, is preserved in the National Archives of Canada.

== Geography ==
Caen is in an area of high humidity. The river Orne flows through the city, as well as small rivers known as les Odons, most of which have been buried under the city to improve urban hygiene. Caen has a large flood zone, named "La prairie", located around the hippodrome, not far from the river Orne, which is regularly submerged.

Caen is 10 km (6.2 mi) from the Channel. A canal (Canal de Caen à la Mer) parallel to the Orne was built during the reign of Napoleon III to link the city to the sea at all times. The canal reaches the English Channel at Ouistreham. A lock keeps the tide out of the canal and lets large ships navigate up the canal to Caen's freshwater harbours.

=== Climate ===
Caen has an oceanic climate that is somewhat ameliorated due to its slightly inland position. In spite of this, summers are still cool by French standards and the climate is typically maritime in terms of high precipitation, relatively modest sunshine hours and mild winters.

Climate data for Caen (CFR), elevation: 67 m (220 ft), 1991–2020 normals, extremes 1945–present, humidity 1961–1990
Month	Jan	Feb	Mar	Apr	May	Jun	Jul	Aug	Sep	Oct	Nov	Dec	Year
Record high °C (°F)	16.8 (62.2)	20.8 (69.4)	24.9 (76.8)	26.6 (79.9)	30.4 (86.7)	40.8 (105.4)	40.1 (104.2)	38.9 (102.0)	33.5 (92.3)	29.6 (85.3)	21.6 (70.9)	17.3 (63.1)	40.1 (104.2)
Mean maximum °C (°F)	13.8 (56.8)	14.7 (58.5)	19.0 (66.2)	22.4 (72.3)	25.6 (78.1)	29.7 (85.5)	31.3 (88.3)	31.4 (88.5)	27.4 (81.3)	22.3 (72.1)	17.1 (62.8)	14.0 (57.2)	33.0 (91.4)
Mean daily maximum °C (°F)	8.3 (46.9)	9.1 (48.4)	11.7 (53.1)	14.4 (57.9)	17.4 (63.3)	20.5 (68.9)	22.9 (73.2)	23.2 (73.8)	20.4 (68.7)	16.2 (61.2)	11.8 (53.2)	8.8 (47.8)	15.4 (59.7)
Daily mean °C (°F)	5.6 (42.1)	5.9 (42.6)	8.0 (46.4)	10.0 (50.0)	13.0 (55.4)	15.9 (60.6)	18.0 (64.4)	18.3 (64.9)	15.8 (60.4)	12.5 (54.5)	8.7 (47.7)	6.1 (43.0)	11.5 (52.7)
Mean daily minimum °C (°F)	2.9 (37.2)	2.8 (37.0)	4.2 (39.6)	5.5 (41.9)	8.5 (47.3)	11.2 (52.2)	13.1 (55.6)	13.3 (55.9)	11.1 (52.0)	8.8 (47.8)	5.6 (42.1)	3.3 (37.9)	7.5 (45.5)
Mean minimum °C (°F)	−5.1 (22.8)	−3.8 (25.2)	−1.8 (28.8)	0.2 (32.4)	3.2 (37.8)	6.2 (43.2)	8.4 (47.1)	8.3 (46.9)	5.9 (42.6)	2.1 (35.8)	−1.0 (30.2)	−4.0 (24.8)	−6.7 (19.9)
Record low °C (°F)	−19.6 (−3.3)	−16.5 (2.3)	−7.4 (18.7)	−5.7 (21.7)	−0.8 (30.6)	1.0 (33.8)	4.7 (40.5)	4.0 (39.2)	1.8 (35.2)	−3.7 (25.3)	−6.8 (19.8)	−11.0 (12.2)	−19.6 (−3.3)
Average precipitation mm (inches)	63.1 (2.48)	52.8 (2.08)	49.7 (1.96)	53.4 (2.10)	59.4 (2.34)	58.0 (2.28)	51.1 (2.01)	59.6 (2.35)	54.3 (2.14)	78.9 (3.11)	78.7 (3.10)	81.3 (3.20)	740.3 (29.15)
Average precipitation days (≥ 1.0 mm)	11.6	11.2	10.0	10.0	9.5	8.6	8.0	8.3	9.1	12.2	13.4	14.2	126.1
Average snowy days	3.4	3.8	2.3	0.9	0.1	0	0	0	0	0	0.9	2.2	13.6
Average relative humidity (%)	86	84	82	80	81	82	81	81	83	86	86	87	83
Mean monthly sunshine hours	70.5	90.2	130.0	179.1	203.4	212.6	218.5	204.8	170.9	117.1	81.9	67.2	1,745.9
Source 1: Météo France
Source 2: Meteociel (sun), Infoclimat.fr (relative humidity 1961–1990) (mean max/min), NOAA (snowy days 1961-1990)

== Population ==
The population data in the table and graph below refer to the commune of Caen proper, in its geography at the given years. The commune of Caen absorbed the former commune of Venoix in 1952.

Historical population

Year	Pop.	±% p.a.
1793	34,805	—
1800	30,923	−1.68%
1806	36,231	+2.68%
1821	36,644	+0.08%
1831	39,140	+0.66%
1836	41,310	+1.09%
1841	43,079	+0.84%
1846	44,087	+0.46%
1851	45,280	+0.54%
1856	41,394	−1.78%
1861	43,740	+1.11%
1866	41,564	−1.02%
1872	41,210	−0.14%
1876	41,181	−0.02%
1881	41,508	+0.16%
1886	43,809	+1.08%
1891	45,201	+0.63%
1896	45,380	+0.08%
1901	44,794	−0.26%

Year	Pop.	±% p.a.
1906	44,442	−0.16%
1911	46,934	+1.10%
1921	53,743	+1.36%
1926	54,128	+0.14%
1931	57,528	+1.23%
1936	61,334	+1.29%
1946	51,445	−1.74%
1954	67,851	+3.52%
1962	91,336	+3.79%
1968	110,262	+3.19%
1975	119,640	+1.17%
1982	114,068	−0.68%
1990	112,846	−0.13%
1999	113,987	+0.11%
2007	109,630	−0.49%
2012	108,365	−0.23%
2017	105,354	−0.56%
2023	109,400	+0.63%

Source: EHESS and INSEE (1968-2023)

== Main sights ==
=== Castle ===
The castle, the Château de Caen, built c. 1060 by William the Conqueror, who successfully conquered England in 1066, is one of the largest medieval fortresses of Western Europe. It remained an essential feature of Norman strategy and policy. At Christmas 1182, a royal court celebration for Christmas in the aula of Caen Castle brought together Henry II and his sons, Richard the Lionheart and John Lackland, receiving more than a thousand knights. Caen Castle, along with all of Normandy, was handed over to the French Crown in 1204. The castle saw several engagements during the Hundred Years' War (1346, 1417, 1450) and was in use as a barracks as late as the Second World War. Bullet holes are visible on the walls of the castle where members of the French Resistance were shot during the Second World War. Today, the castle serves as a museum that houses the Musée des Beaux-Arts de Caen (Museum of Fine Arts of Caen) and Musée de Normandie (Museum of Normandy) along with many periodical exhibitions about arts and history. (See "Timeline of Caen Castle". Archived from the original on 13 February 2006.)

=== Abbeys ===
In repentance for marrying his cousin Mathilda of Flanders, William ordered two abbeys to be built with the Pope's encouragement:

- Église St.-Étienne, formerly the Abbaye aux Hommes (Men's Abbey). It was completed in 1063 and is dedicated to St Stephen. The current Hôtel de Ville (City Hall) of Caen is built onto the South Transept of the building.
- Église de la Ste.-Trinité, formerly the Abbaye aux Dames (Women's Abbey). It was completed in 1060 and is dedicated to the Holy Trinity. The current seat of the regional council (conseil régional) of Basse-Normandie is nearby.

=== Others ===
- Jardin botanique de Caen, a historic botanical garden
- Church of Saint-Pierre
- Church of Saint-Étienne-le-Vieux
- Church of Saint-Jean de Caen
- Mémorial pour la Paix ("Memorial for Peace") built in 1988, a museum charting the events leading up to and after D-Day. It is an emotional presentation inviting meditation on the thought of Elie Wiesel: "Peace is not a gift from God to man, but a gift from man to himself". The Memorial for Peace also includes an exhibit of Nobel Peace Prize winners and another one on Conflict Resolution in different cultures.
- Parc Festyland, an amusement park to the west of Caen in the nearby town of Carpiquet. The park receives 110,000 visitors every year.
- Mondeville 2 is a regional shopping centre in adjoining Mondeville.
- Medieval wooden houses
- Colline aux Oiseaux, a floral parc located on the former dump of the city of Caen

== Administration ==
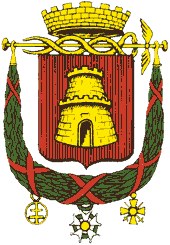
The coat of arms of Caen

Mayors of Caen have included:

- 1945–1959: Yves Guillou, Rally of the French People
- 1959–1970: Jean-Marie Louvel, MRP and Centre Démocrate
- 1970–2001: Jean-Marie Girault, Republican Party and UDF
- 2001–2008: Brigitte Le Brethon, RPR and UMP
- 2008–2014: Philippe Duron, PS
- 2014–2024: Joël Bruneau, The Republicans
- 2024–present: Aristide Olivier, The Republicans

Aristide Olivier was re-elected mayor in the 2026 municipal elections.

In 1952, the small commune of Venoix became part of Caen.

In 1990, the agglomeration of Caen was organized into a district, transformed in 2002 into a Communauté d'agglomération (Grand Caen (Greater Caen), renamed Caen la Mer in 2004), gathers 29 towns and villages, including Villons-les-Buissons, Lion-sur-Mer, Hermanville-sur-Mer, which joined the Communauté d'agglomération in 2004. The population of the "communauté d'agglomération" is around 220,000 inhabitants.

In the former administrative organisation, Caen was a part of 9 cantons, of which it was the chief town. These cantons contained a total of 13 towns. Caen gave its name to a 10th canton, of which it was not part. Since the 2015 canton reorganization, Caen is part of the cantons of Caen-1, 2, 3, 4 and 5.

== Transport ==
=== Public transport ===
==== Urban transport network ====
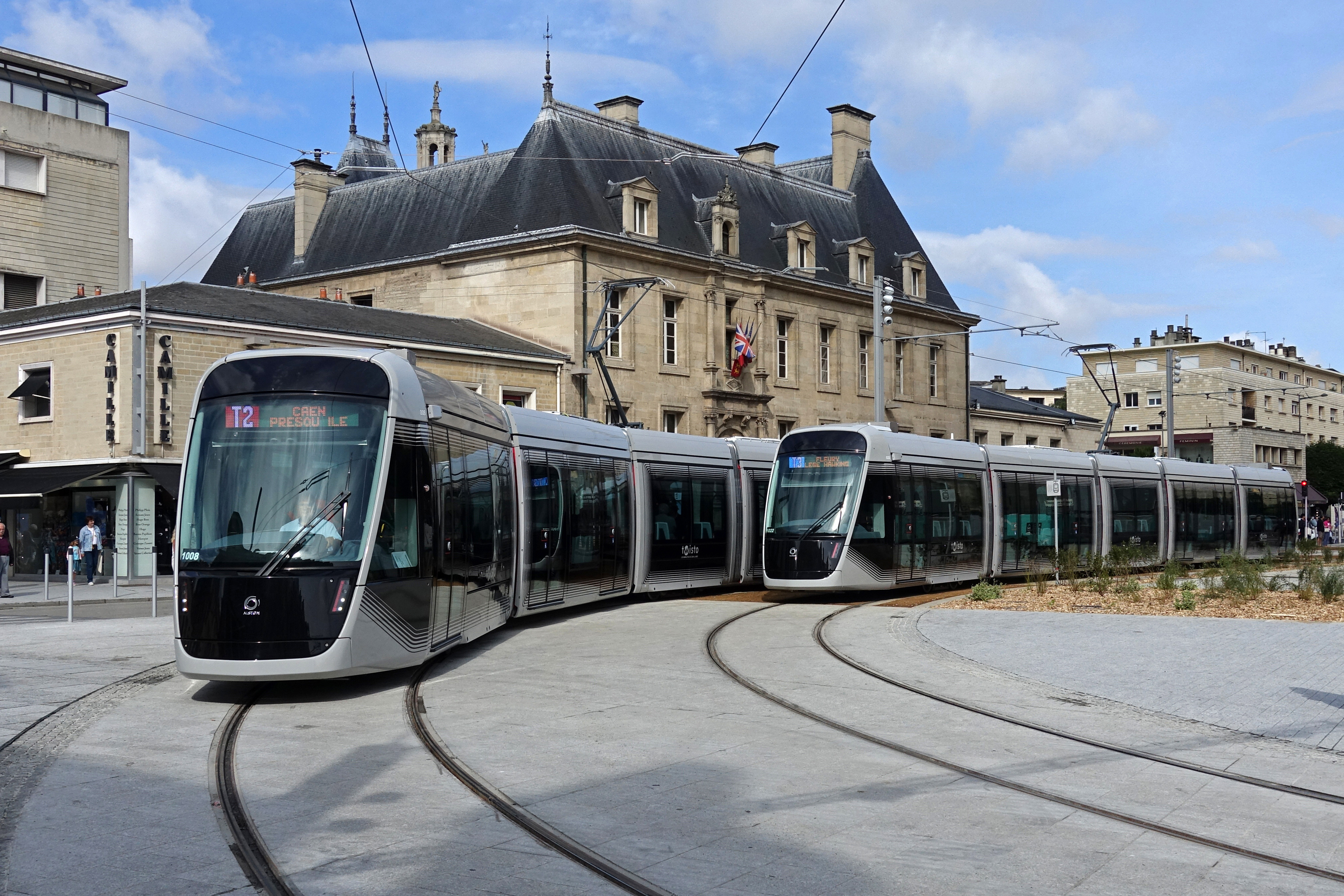
The current Caen tramway opened in 2019.

Twisto is the urban transport network of Caen, including about sixty bus lines and 3 tramway lines. The present tram network officially opened on 27 July 2019 replacing the Caen Guided Light Transit (French: TVR de Caen but known locally as the "tram"), a guided trolleybus network which operated from 2002 to 2017, which was closed due to reliability issues. The city previously had a tramway which operated from 1860 to 1937.

==== Rail ====
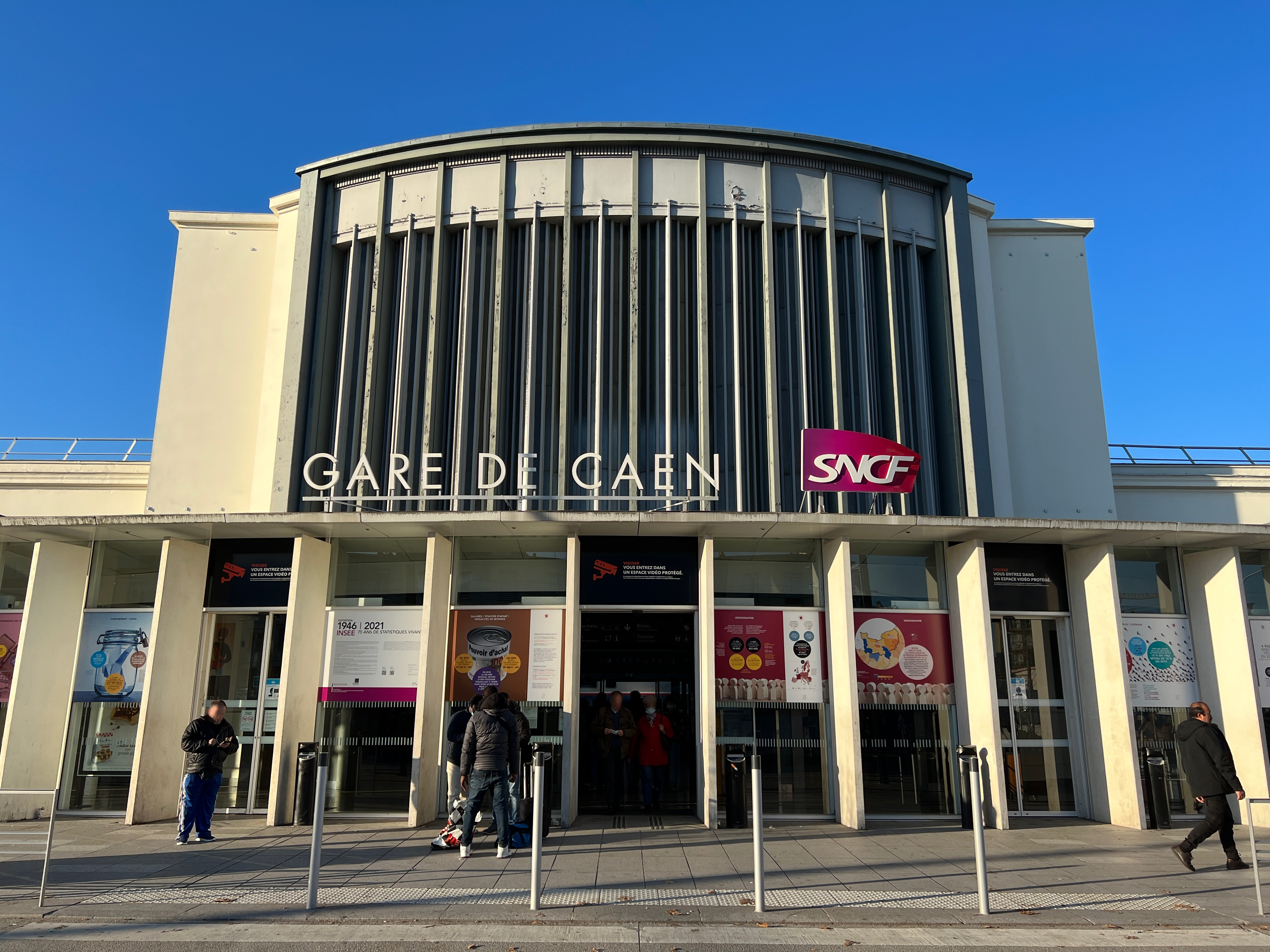
Caen railway station

Caen also had several main and branch railway lines linking Caen railway station (French: Gare de Caen) to all parts of Normandy with lines to Paris, Vire, Flers, Cabourg, Houlgate, Deauville, Saint-Lô, Bayeux and Cherbourg.

Now the SNCF operates the Paris-Caen-Cherbourg, Caen-Rouen, Caen-Le Mans-Tours, Caen-Rennes services and some others small lines, while Railcoop will soon open new lines such as Lille-Amiens-Rouen-Caen-Rennes-Nantes and Paris-Caen-Brest making Caen railway station its north-western hub.

Caen station is the second busiest in Normandy, after Rouen station.

=== Air transport ===
Caen - Carpiquet Airport is the biggest airport in Normandy considering the number of passengers and flights that it serves every year. Most flights are operated by HOP!, Volotea and the French national airline Air France operates flights to the French cities of Lyon, Nice, Toulouse, Montpellier, Marseille, Biarritz, Ajaccio, Figari, Bastia and Calvi.

=== Water transport ===
Caen is served by the large port of Ouistreham, lying at the mouth of the Caen Canal where it meets the English Channel. A cruise/ferry service operates between Portsmouth, England, and Caen/Ouistreham running both standard roll-on-roll-off car ferries and supercat fast ferries, with the latter making crossing from March to November. The ferry terminal is 15 km (9.3 mi) from Caen with a daytime shuttle bus service for foot passengers. There is also a cyclist road from Caen to Ouistreham.

=== Road transport ===
Caen is connected to the rest of France by motorways to Paris (A13), Brittany and Southern France (A84) and to Le Mans and central France (A88–A28). The A13 and A88 are toll roads while the A84 is a toll-free motorway. The city is encircled by the N814 ring-road (Boulevard Périphérique) that was completed in the late 1990s. The N13 connects Caen to Cherbourg and to Paris. A section of the former N13 (Caen-Paris) is now D613 (in Calvados) following road renumbering. The Boulevard Périphérique includes a viaduct called the Viaduc de Calix that goes over the canal and the river Orne. The canal links the city to the sea to permit cargo ships and ferries to dock in the port of Caen. Ferries which have docked include the Quiberon and the Duc de Normandie.

== Education ==
- The University of Caen has around 34,000 students in five different campuses and Caen is ranked 18th biggest student city of France. The University has a good reputation as it is ranked 16th in France.
- The University is divided into 11 colleges, called UFR (Unité fondamentale de Recherche), six institutes, one Engineering School, two IUP and five local campuses. The University is one of the oldest in France, having been founded by John of Lancaster, Duke of Bedford, and Henry VI of England, in 1432.
- Caen also has a school of fine arts L'ésam Caen/Cherbourg and grandes écoles such as the École nationale supérieure d'ingénieurs de Caen and the École supérieure d'ingénieurs des travaux de la construction de Caen.
- A campus of the business school, the École de management de Normandie, is also located in the city.

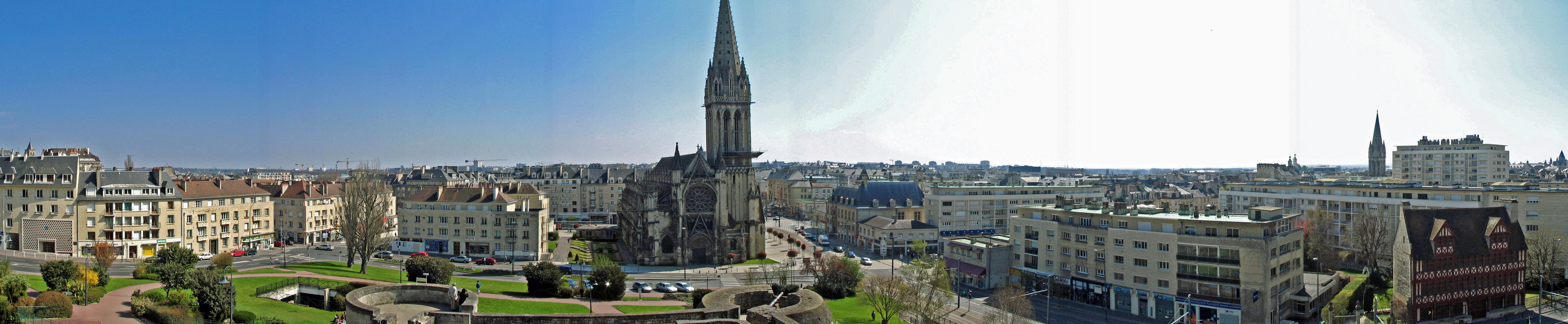
The Caen skyline facing the Saint-Pierre Church. Photo taken from the Château de Caen – April 2007.

== Economy ==
The agricultural and food-processing Agrial cooperative has its head office in Caen. Agrial group processes vegetables, cider apples, milk, poultry and meat with the help of its 12,000 employees and all its partners.

== Music and theatre ==
The Théâtre de Caen (1963) is the home of the Baroque musical ensemble Les Arts Florissants. The organization was founded by conductor William Christie in 1979 and derives its name from the 1685 opera by Marc-Antoine Charpentier.

== Notable people ==
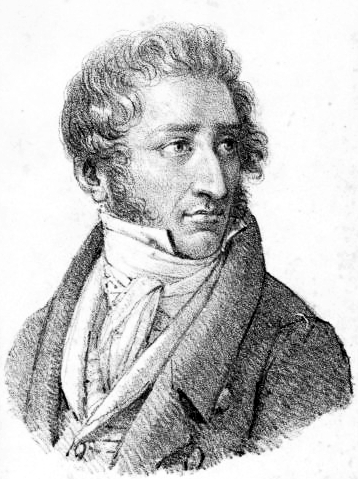
Louis Gustave le Doulcet, comte de Pontécoulant

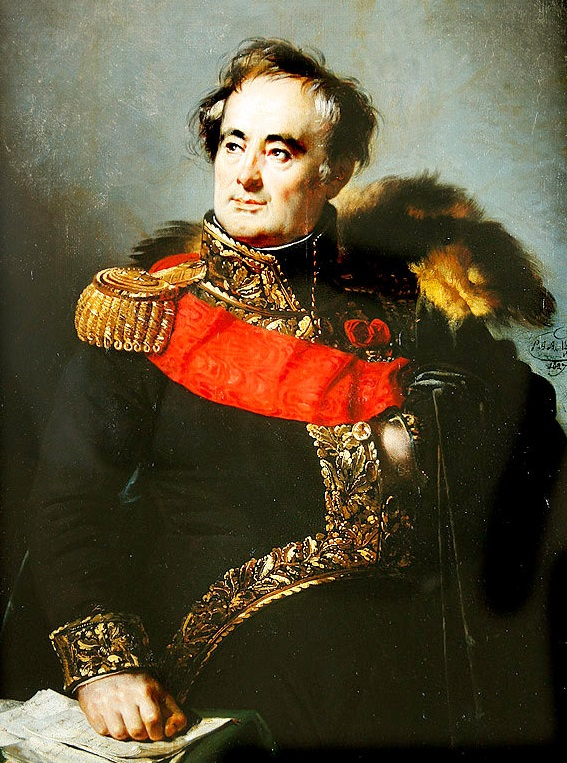
Charles Mathieu Isidore Decaen, 1827

Caen was the birthplace or origin of:

=== Public service ===
- Robert, 1st Earl of Gloucester (ca.1090–1147), illegitimate son of Henry I of England.
- Robert Constantin (ca.1530 – 1605), physician, bibliographer, lexicographer and humanist.
- Samuel Bochart (1599–1667 in Caen), Protestant biblical scholar, taught Pierre Daniel Huet.
- St. John Eudes (1601–1680), Catholic priest, forerunner of the devotion to the Sacred Heart.
- Tanneguy Le Fèvre (1615–1672), classical scholar.
- Pierre Daniel Huet (1630–1721), churchman and scholar.
- Gervais de La Rue (1751–1835), historian, re. Norman language and Anglo-Norman literature
- Louis Gustave le Doulcet, comte de Pontécoulant (1764–1853), politician.
- Charlotte Corday (1768–1793), guillotined for the assassination of Jean-Paul Marat
- Charles Mathieu Isidore Decaen (1769–1832), a French general.
- Eugène Poubelle (1831–1907), lawyer and diplomat, introduced waste containers to Paris
- Charles-Hippolyte Pouthas (1886–1974), historian of political and religious history
- Marie-Pierre Kœnig (1898–1970), Maréchal de France, commanded the Free French at the Battle of Bir Hakeim
- Claude Hettier de Boislambert (1906-1986), Resistance leader, governor, politician, diplomat
- Ovida Delect (1926–1996), poet, Communist, politician, member of the French resistance in WWII and a trans woman.
- Sonia de La Provôté (born 1968), member of the French Senate
- Fabrice Le Vigoureux (born 1969), member of the National Assembly

=== The arts ===
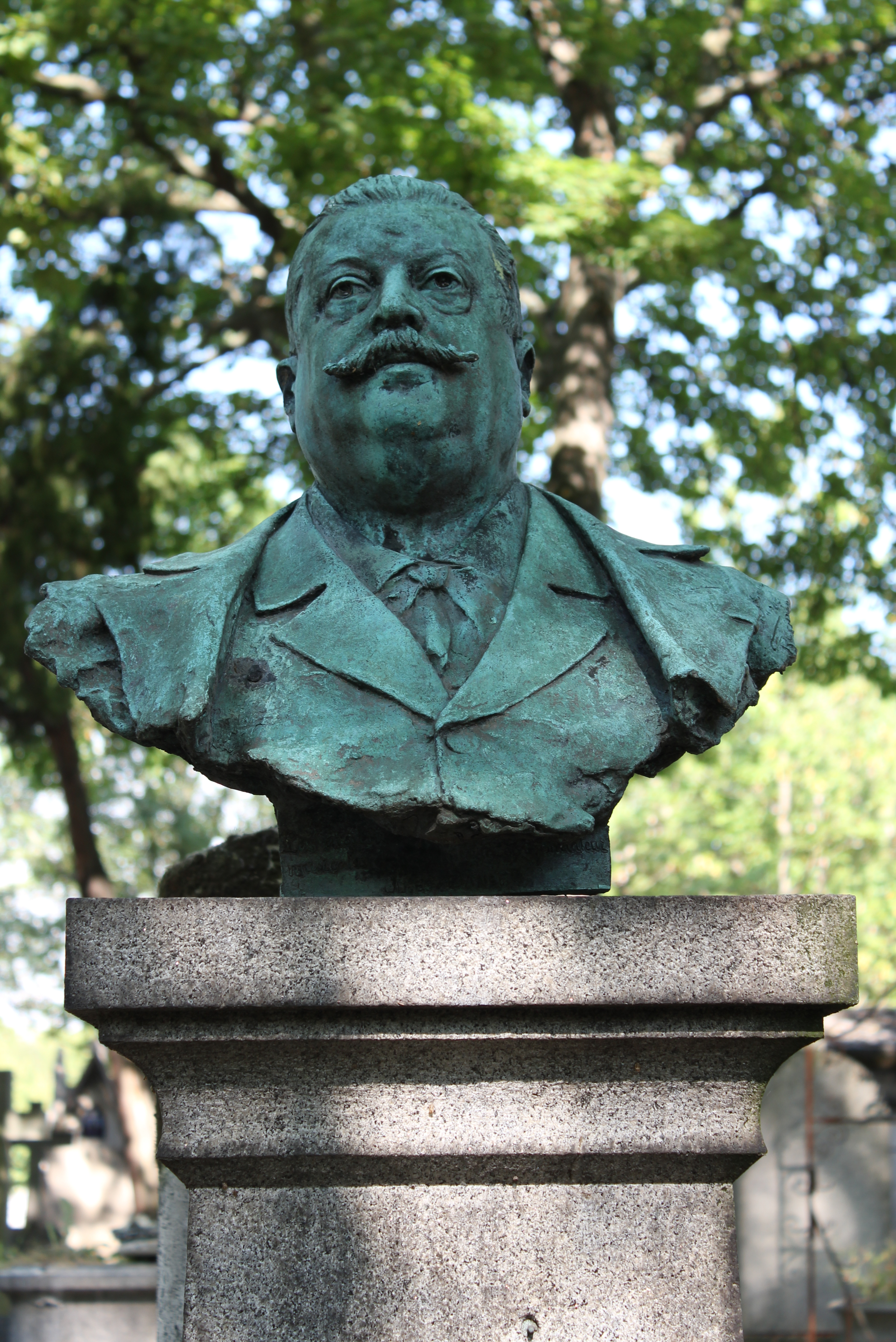
bust of Jules Danbé

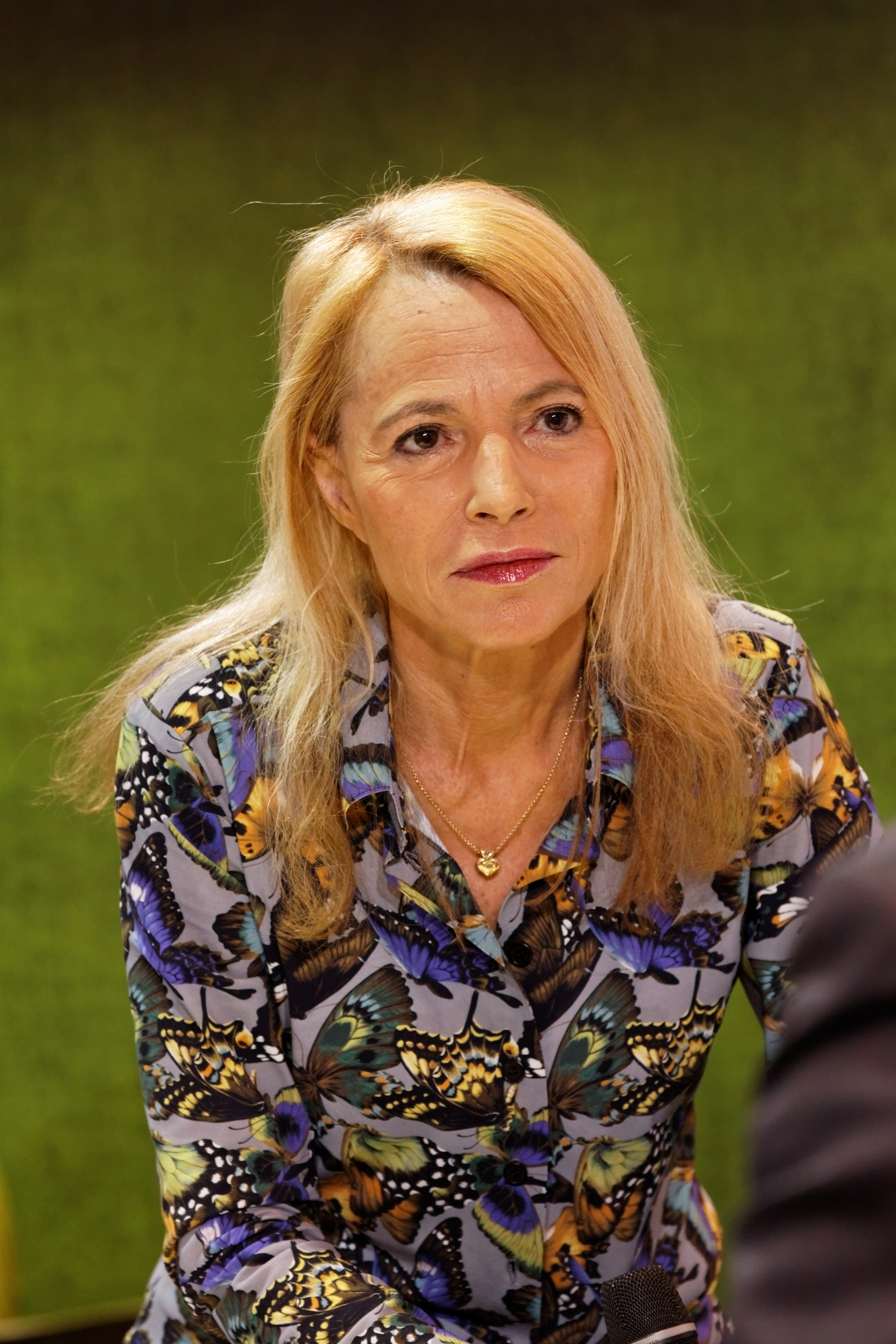
Laure Adler, 2012

- Jean Bertaut (1552–1611), poet of light verse to celebrate the incidents of court life.
- François de Malherbe (1555 at Le Locheur – 1628), poet, critic and translator.
- François le Métel de Boisrobert (1592–1662), poet, playwright and courtier.
- Jean François Sarrazin (ca.1611 at Hermanville – 1654), a French writer.
- René Auguste Constantin de Renneville (1650–1723), writer.
- Jean-Baptiste Belin (1653–1715), painter who specialized in flowers.
- François Henri Turpin (1709–1799), man of literature.
- J. Hector St. John de Crèvecœur (1735–1813), French-American writer
- Jean-Jacques Boisard (1744–1833), writer who specialized in fables
- Jean-François Boisard (1762–1820), painter and poet.
- Daniel Auber (1782–1871), composer and director of the Paris Conservatoire.
- Étienne Mélingue (1807–1875), actor, sculptor and painter.
- Jules Danbé (1840–1905), a violinist, composer and conductor, mainly of opera.
- Gabriel Dupont (1878–1914), composer of operas and chamber music.
- Roger Grenier (1919–2017), writer, journalist and radio animator.
- Alain Duhamel (born 1940), journalist and political commentator.
- Jean-Loup Rivière (1948–2018), playwright and drama critic.
- Laure Adler (born 1950), journalist, writer, publisher and radio/TV producer.
- Christophe Desjardins (born 1962), a viola player and specialist in contemporary music.
- Olivier Baroux (born 1964), actor, comedian, writer and director
- Gilles Peterson (born 1964), DJ, record collector, record label owner; lives in London
- Léa Drucker (born 1972), French actress
- Laurent Lefrançois (born 1974), French contemporary composer
- Orelsan (born 1982), rapper, songwriter, record producer, actor and film director
- Seb Toussaint (born 1988), street artist and painter

=== Science and business ===
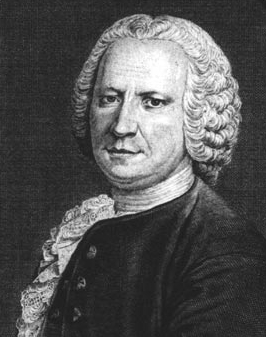
Guillaume-François Rouelle

- Pierre Varignon (1654–1722), mathematician; he invented the U-tube manometer.
- Estienne Roger (c 1664–1722), printer, bookseller and publisher of sheet music
- Paul Jacques Malouin (1701–1778), physician and chemist
- Guillaume-François Rouelle (1703 at Mathieu – 1770), chemist and apothecary
- Louis Lépecq de La Clôture (1736–1804), surgeon and epidemiologist
- Pierre-Simon Girard (1765–1836), mathematician and engineer, worked on fluid mechanics.
- Hippolyte-Victor Collet-Descotils (1773–1815), chemist; discovered iridium in 1803.
- Jacques Amand Eudes-Deslongchamps (1794–1867), naturalist and palaeontologist
- Eugène Eudes-Deslongchamps (1830–1889), paleontologist and naturalist
- Jules Lair (1836–1907), businessman, paleographer, historian and antiquary
- André-Louis Danjon (1890–1967), astronomer, measured the earthshine on the moon.
- René Herse (1908–1976), builder of high-quality touring, randonneur and racing bicycles
- Jean-Pierre Lehman (1914–1981), paleontologist who studied the anatomy and evolution of fossil fish
- Jean-Yves Marin (born 1955), archeologist, medievalist and chief curator of French heritage
- Pierre Denis (born 1964), businessman, CEO of Jimmy Choo Ltd, 2012–2020

=== Sport ===
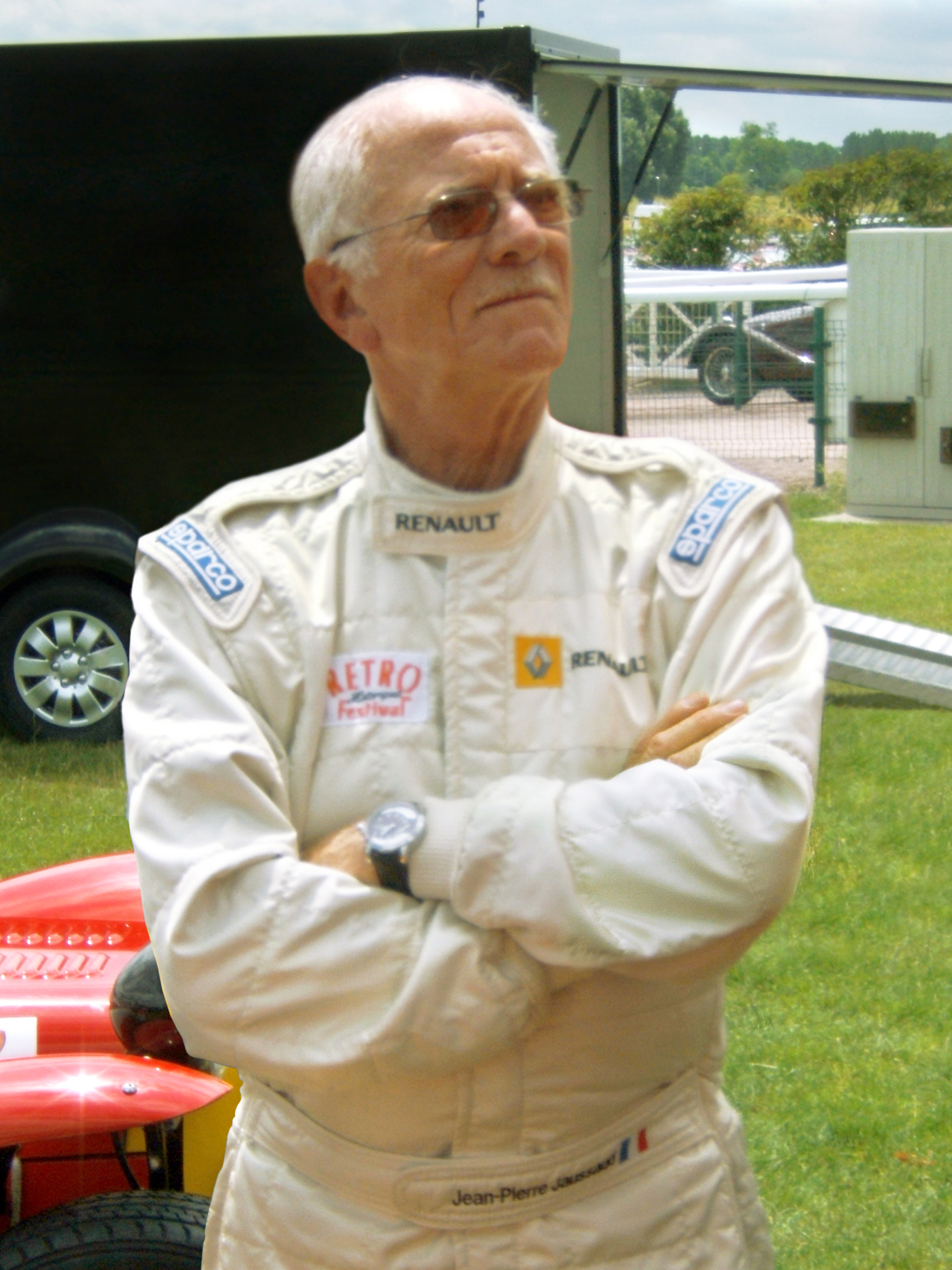
Jean-Pierre Jaussaud, 2009

- René Menzies (ca.1889 – ca.1971), long-distance cycling record holder
- Jean-Pierre Jaussaud (1937–2021), racing driver, won the 24 Hours of Le Mans in 1978 and 1980.
- Jean-François Ballester (1965–2018), figure skater, gold medallist at the 2018 Winter Olympics
- Corinne Lagache (born 1975), former football goalkeeper with 27 caps with France women
- Bruno Grougi (born 1983), a former footballer with 451 club caps and 3 for Martinique
- Jérémy Sorbon (born 1983), a former footballer with 518 club caps
- Joël Thomas (born 1987), a former footballer
- Benoît Costil (born 1987), footballer with over 480 club caps and 1 for France
- Youssef El-Arabi (born 1987), footballer with over 546 club caps and 46 for Morocco and over 303 goals
- Bruno Massot (born 1989), pair skater, gold medallist at the 2018 Winter Olympics
- Clévid Dikamona (born 1990), footballer who has 4 caps with Congo
- Jason Bahamboula (born 2001) - footballer who also plays for Congo.
- Kaïlé Auvray (born 2004), footballer

== International relations ==
Caen is twinned with:

- Alexandria, United States
- Nashville, United States
- Ohrid, North Macedonia
- Portsmouth, England, United Kingdom
- Reșița, Romania
- Thiès, Senegal
- Würzburg, Germany
- Anzio, Italy

== Sport ==
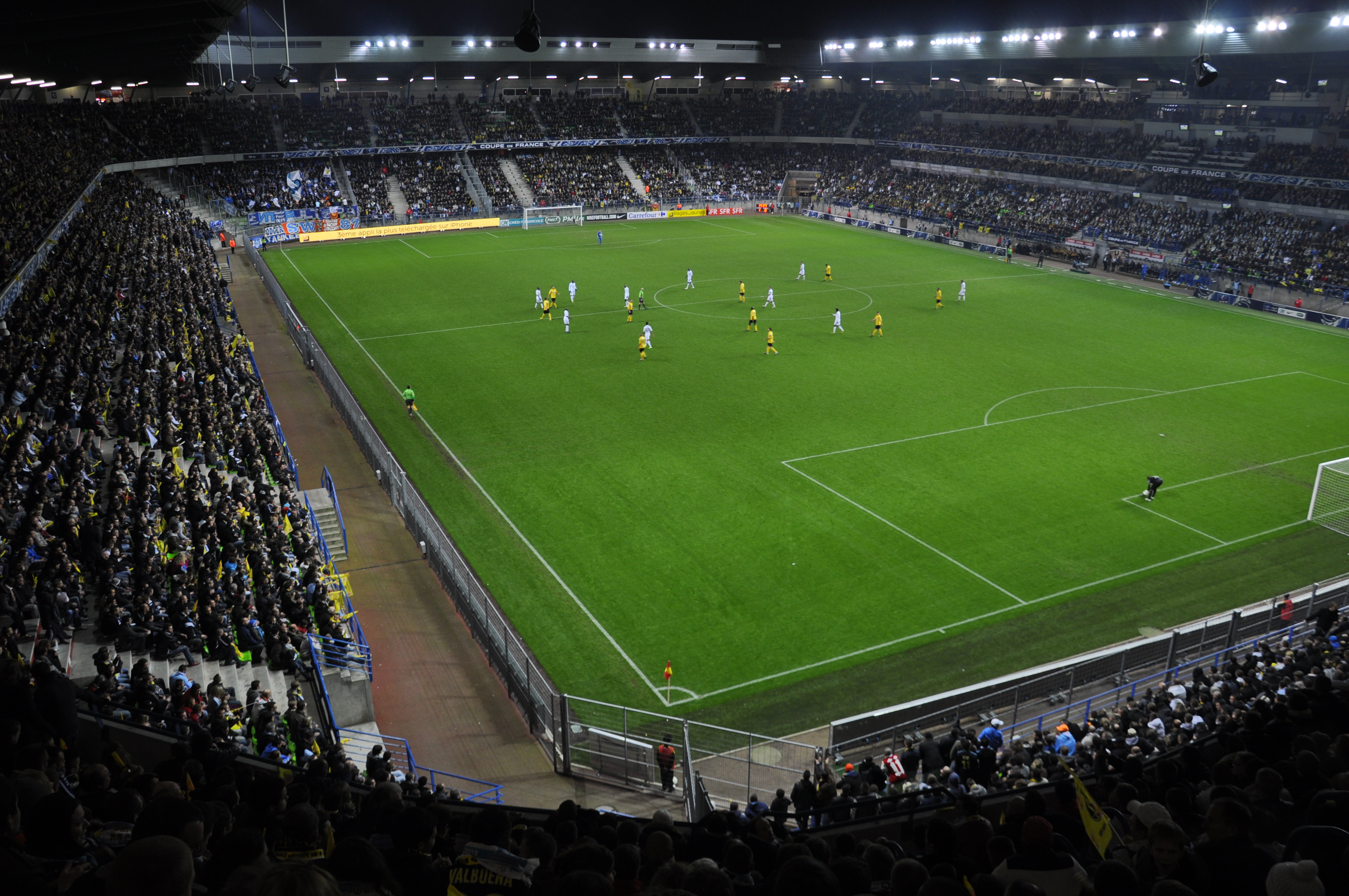
Stade Michel d'Ornano

From 1947 to 2006, Caen was a stage of the Tour de France a total of 15 times. Further, Caen was one of the hosts of the EuroBasket 1983. The largest football team in the city is, SM Caen, who as of 2024 are owned by superstar footballer Kylian Mbappé. There are three smaller football clubs in the area, AG Caen, MOS Caen and ASPTT Caen. The Drakkars de Caen play ice hockey in the FFHG Division 1. In 2014, Caen was the location of the 2014 FEI World Equestrian Games.

Caen has a racecourse called the Hippodrome de la Prairie; it has been used since 1837. The course is designed specifically for harness racing.

== Symbols ==
=== Heraldry ===
Current arms:

Gules, a single-towered open castle Or, windowed and masoned sable.

Under the Ancien Régime: Per fess, gules and azure, 3 fleurs de lys Or.

During the First French Empire: Gules, a single-towered castle Or, a chief of Good Imperial Cities (gules, 3 bees Or).

Arms in effect under Ancien Régime.

Arms requested from Napoleon in 1809 which were refused.

Arms in effect under the First French Empire.

Arms in effect today, reverting to the original arms of the 13th century.

=== Motto ===
Today, Caen has no motto, but it used to have one, which did not survive the French Revolution. As a result, its spelling is archaic and has not been updated:

Un Dieu, un Roy, une Foy, une Loy.

(One God, one King, one Faith, one Law.)

This motto is reflected in a notable old Chant royal.

=== Code ===
Caen's home port code is CN.

== Gallery ==
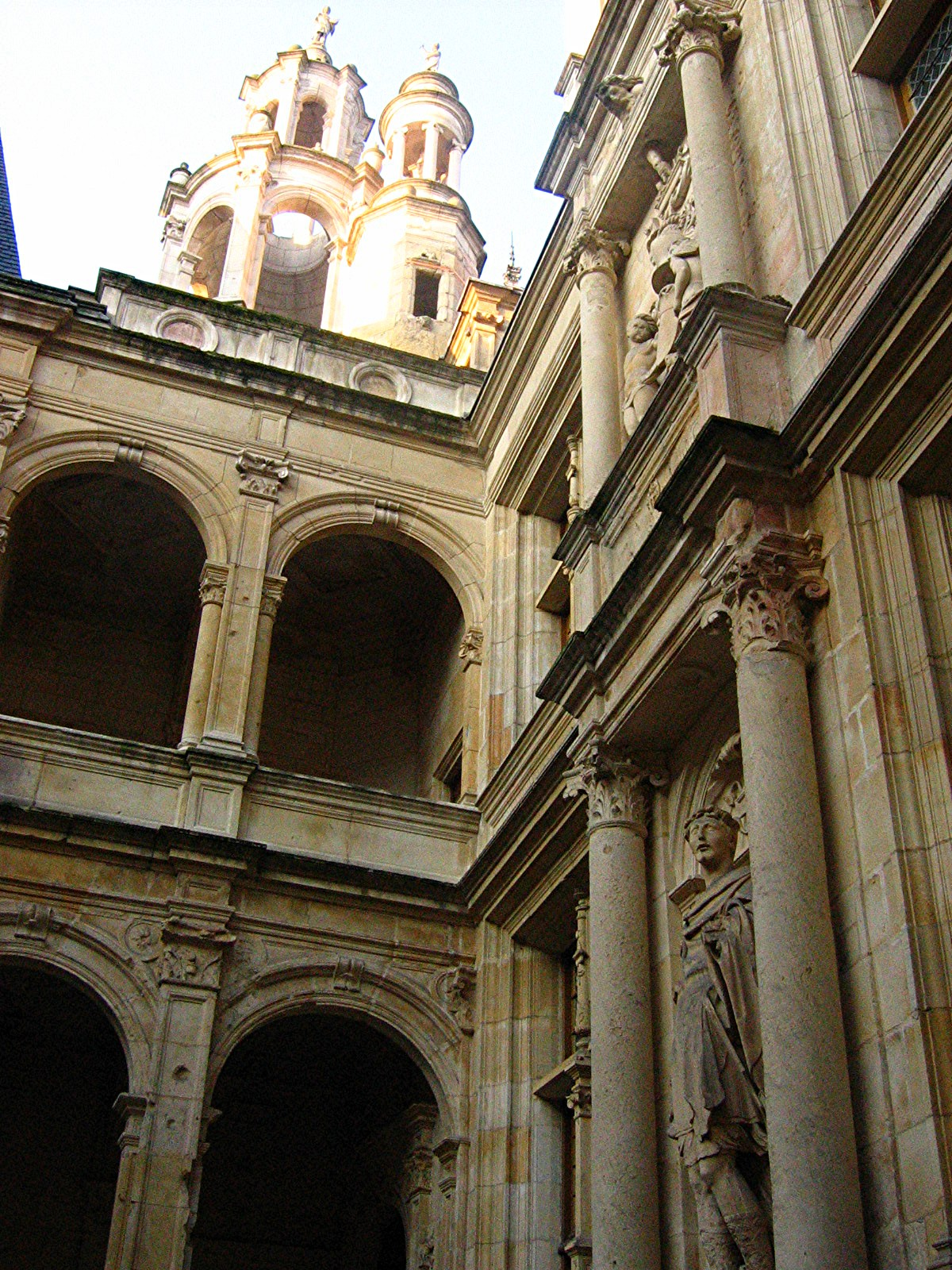
Hôtel d'Escoville, 16th century, Caen

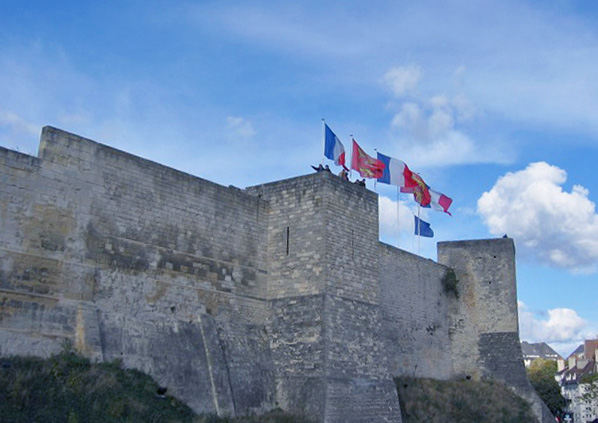
South Wall of the Castle, a huge fortress in the centre of the city

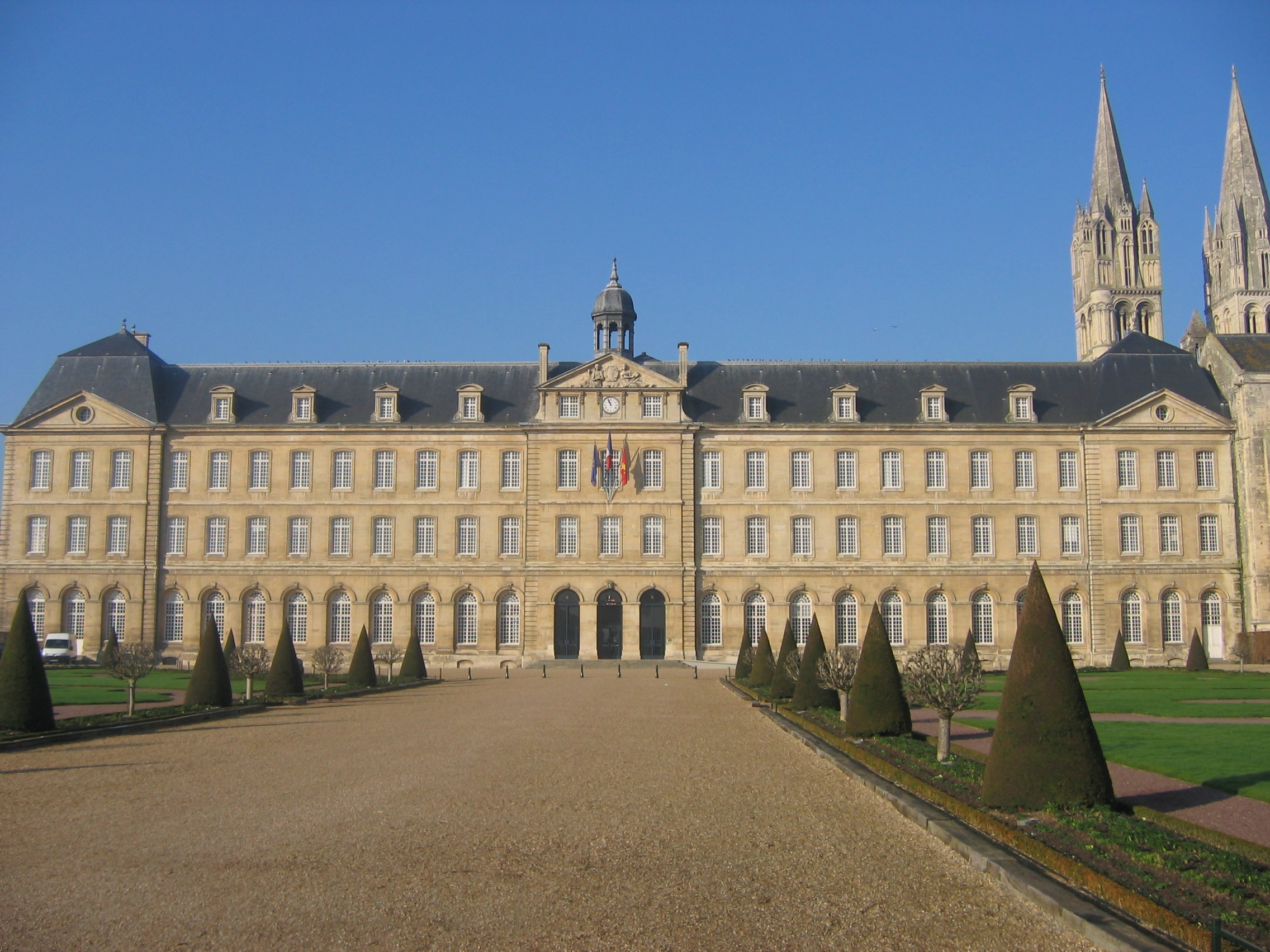
Town Hall of Caen

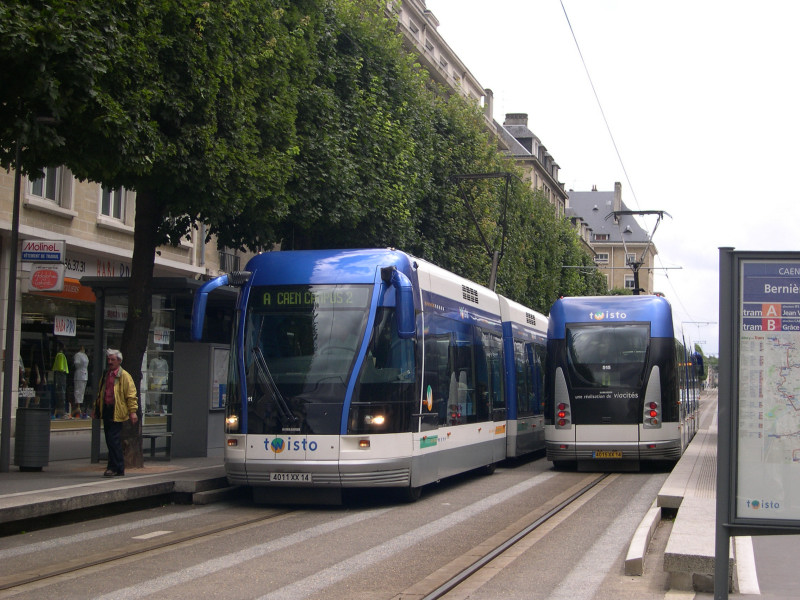
Caen's former 'tramway' was in fact a modern guided-bus system.

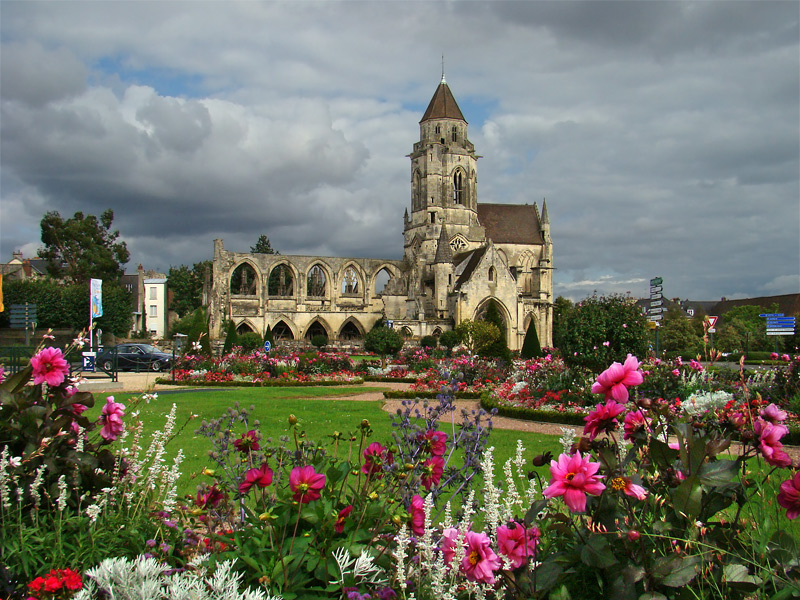
Saint-Étienne-le-Vieux Church

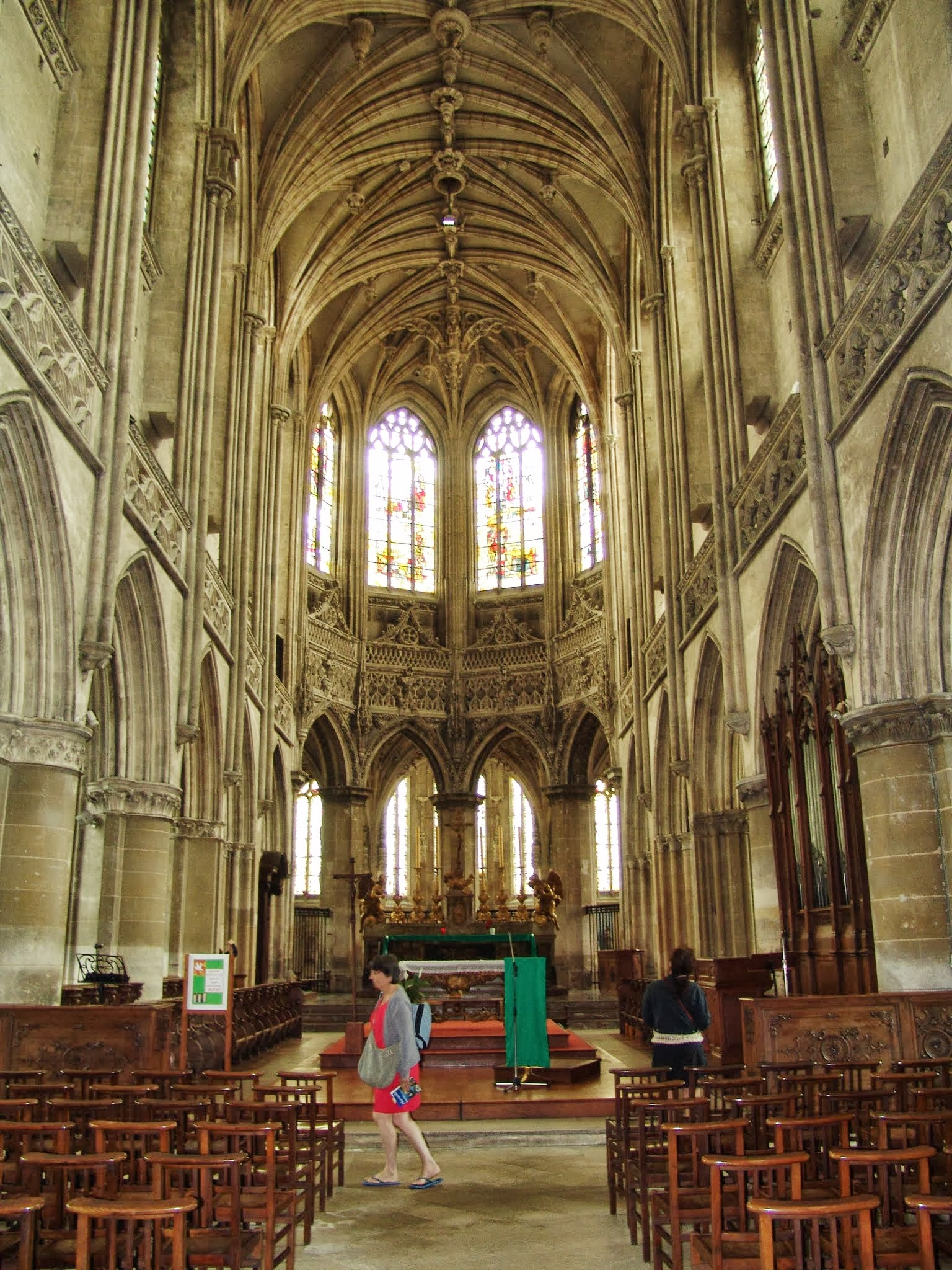
Interior of Saint-Pierre Church

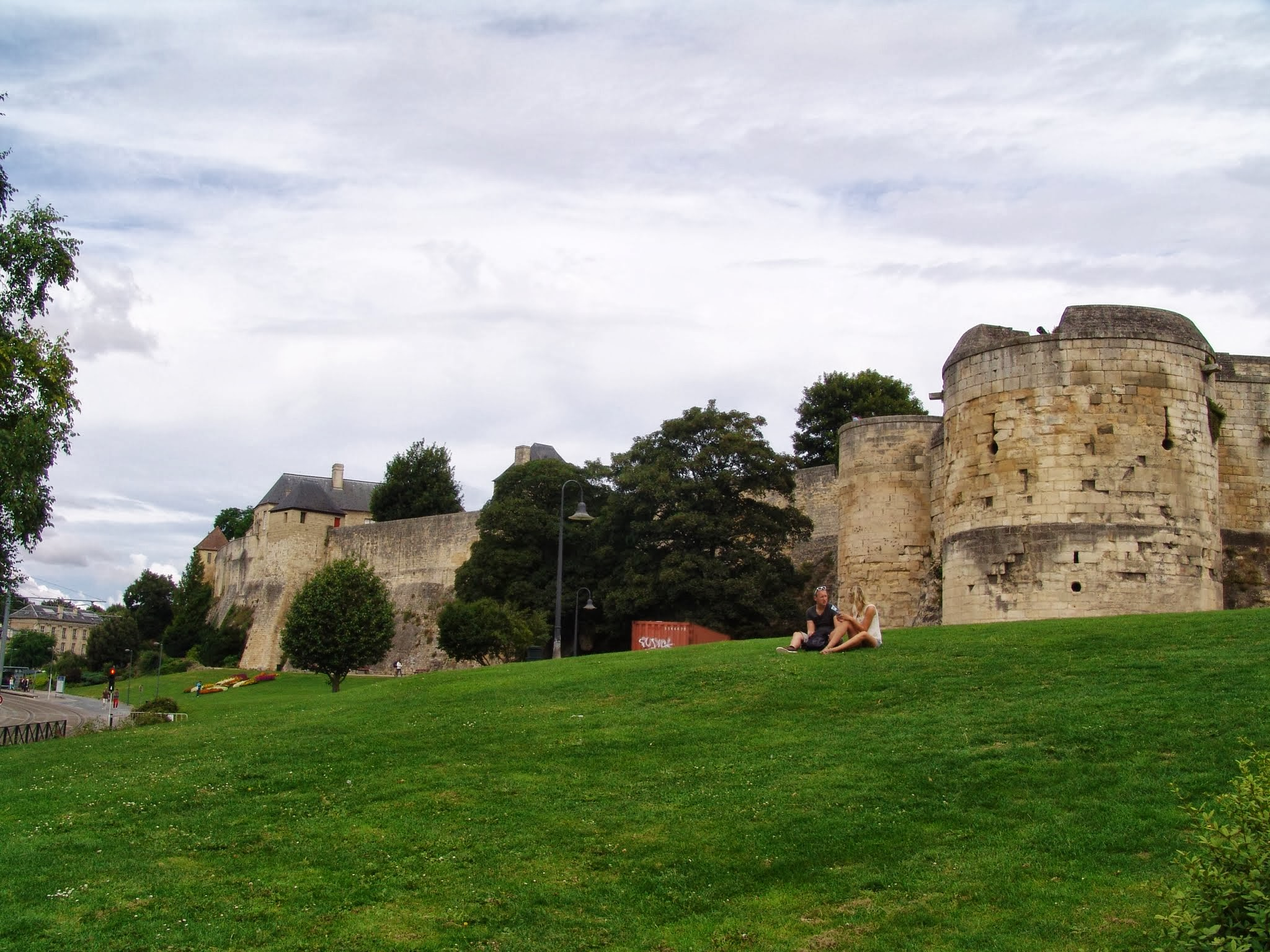
The fortress of Caen

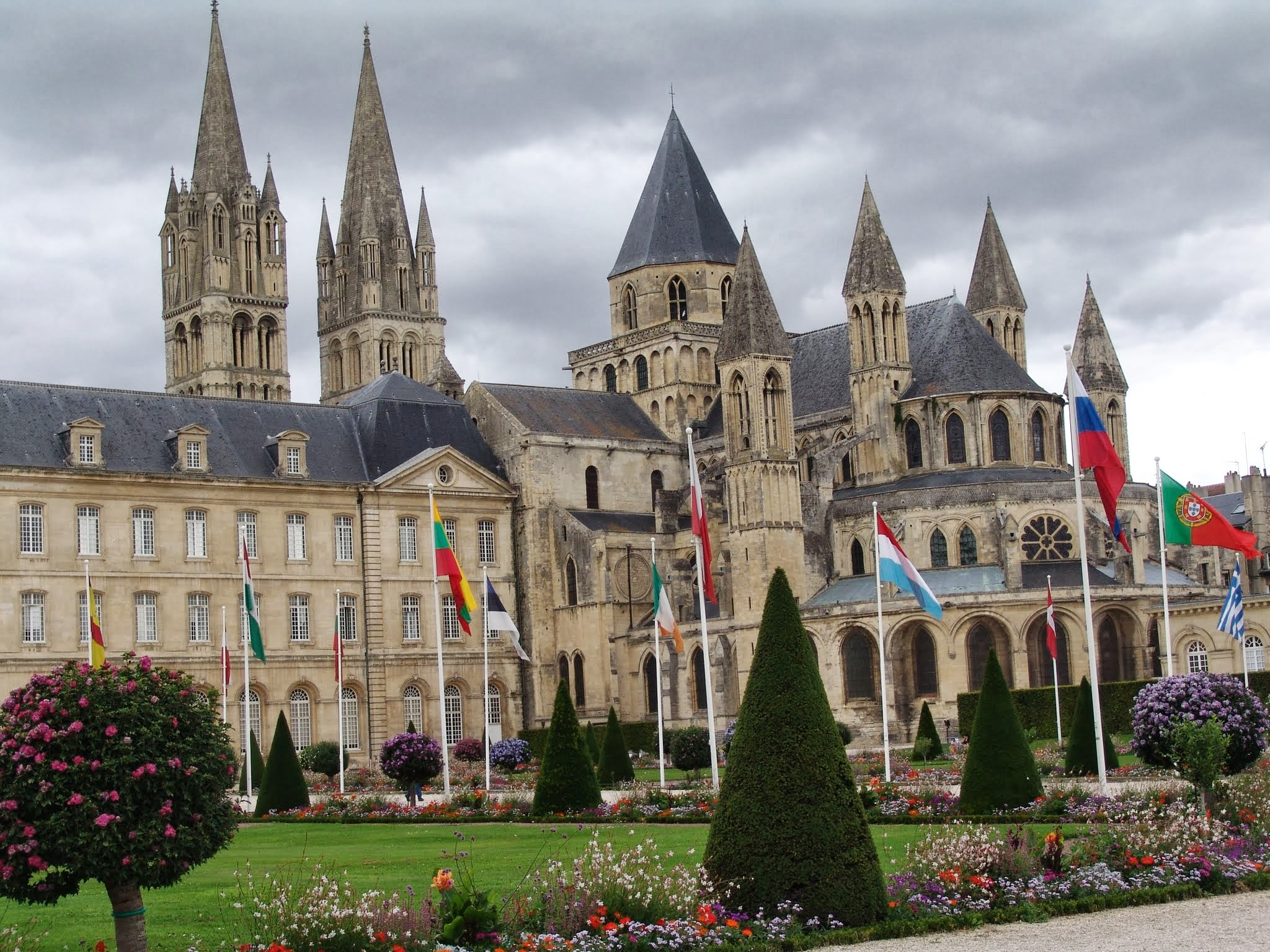
The Abbey of St. Étienne

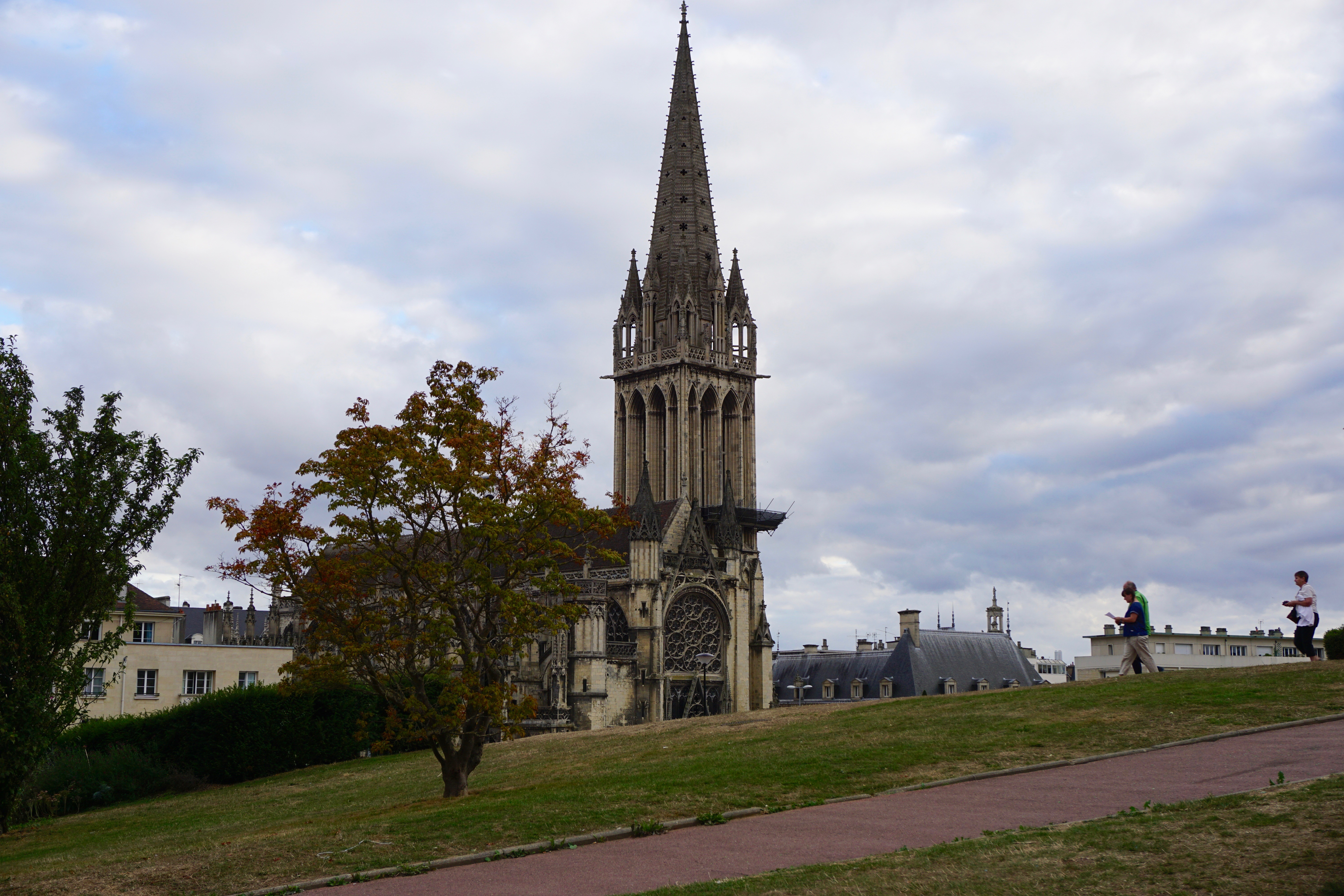
Église Saint Pierre seen from in front of the Château

== See also ==
- Stade Malherbe Caen – French football club
- Caen stone – Limestone quarried near Caen, France
- Communes of the Calvados department
- Forum of Vieux-la-Romaine

== Bibliography ==
- Joseph Decaëns and Adrien Dubois (ed.), Caen Castle. A ten Centuries Old Fortress within the Town, Publications du CRAHM, 2010, ISBN 978-2-902685-75-2, Publications du CRAHM
