= 2024 French legislative election in Calvados =

Following the first round of the 2024 French legislative election on 30 June 2024, runoff elections in each constituency where no candidate received a vote share greater than 50 percent were scheduled for 7 July. Candidates permitted to stand in the runoff elections needed to either come in first or second place in the first round or achieve more than 12.5 percent of the votes of the entire electorate (as opposed to 12.5 percent of the vote share due to low turnout).

== Calvados ==
=== 1st constituency ===
Candidate	Party or alliance		First round		Second round	
Candidate	Party or alliance		Votes	%	Votes	%
Joel Bruneau	Miscellaneous right	Independent	22,596	43.11	28,691	59.87
Emma Fourreau	New Popular Front	La France Insoumise	18,250	34.82	19,229	40.13
Ludivine Daoudi	National Rally		10,458	19.95		
Matéo Leloup	Reconquête		604	1.15		
Pierre Casevitz	Far-left	Lutte Ouvrière	510	0.97		
Total			52,418	100.00	47,920	100.00
Valid votes			52,418	98.02	47,920	93.93
Invalid votes			397	0.74	756	1.48
Blank votes			663	1.24	2,342	4.59
Total votes			53,478	100.00	51,018	100.00
Registered voters/turnout			73,296	72.96	73,292	69.61

=== 2nd constituency ===
Candidate	Party or alliance		First round		Second round	
Candidate	Party or alliance		Votes	%	Votes	%
Arthur Delaporte	New Popular Front	Socialist Party	19,662	42.34	29,761	68.28
Josseline Liban	National Rally		11,999	25.84	13,823	31.72
Camille Brou	Miscellaneous right	The Republicans	7,159	15.42		
Grégory Berkovicz	Ensemble	Renaissance	6,503	14.00		
Cédric Bazincourt	Sovereigntist right	Debout la France	566	1.22		
Christophe Garcia	Far-left	Lutte Ouvrière	547	1.18		
Total			46,436	100.00	43,584	100.00
Valid votes			46,436	97.89	43,584	92.68
Invalid votes			376	0.79	1,053	2.24
Blank votes			626	1.32	2,387	5.08
Total votes			47,438	100.00	47,024	100.00
Registered voters/turnout			69,012	68.74	69,029	68.12

=== 3rd constituency ===
Candidate	Party or alliance		First round		Second round	
Candidate	Party or alliance		Votes	%	Votes	%
Edouard Fauvage	National Rally		21,575	41.09	23,562	45.22
Jérémie Patrier-Leitus	Ensemble	Horizons	19,144	36.46	28,545	54.78
Olivier Truffaut	New Popular Front	Socialist Party	9,959	18.97		
Steven Mafiodo	Sovereigntist right	Debout la France	1,080	2.06		
Michel Langevin	Far-left	Lutte Ouvrière	732	1.39		
Thierry-Paul Valette	Independent		12	0.02		
Total			52,502	100.00	52,107	100.00
Valid votes			52,502	97.40	52,107	96.13
Invalid votes			462	0.86	602	1.11
Blank votes			939	1.74	1,497	2.76
Total votes			53,903	100.00	54,206	100.00
Registered voters/turnout			79,965	67.41	79,972	67.78

=== 4th constituency ===
Candidate	Party or alliance		First round		Second round	
Candidate	Party or alliance		Votes	%	Votes	%
Aurélie Quinquis	National Rally		24,230	33.65	28,610	40.58
Christophe Blanchet	Ensemble	Democratic Movement	23,622	32.80	41,893	59.42
Pierre Mouraret	New Popular Front	Communist Party	14,246	19.78		
Sophie Gaugain	Miscellaneous right		7,847	10.90		
Pascale Deutsch	Reconquête		878	1.22		
François Buisson	Sovereigntist right	Debout la France	747	1.04		
Patrick Poirot Bourdain	Far-left	Lutte Ouvrière	442	0.61		
Total			72,012	100.00	70,503	100.00
Valid votes			72,012	97.97	70,503	95.86
Invalid votes			492	0.67	811	1.10
Blank votes			1,000	1.36	2,237	3.04
Total votes			73,504	100.00	73,551	100.00
Registered voters/turnout			104,874	70.09	104,867	70.14

=== 5th constituency ===
Candidate	Party or alliance		First round		Second round	
Candidate	Party or alliance		Votes	%	Votes	%
Philippe Chapron	National Rally		21,001	31.86	24,486	38.32
Bertrand Bouyx	Ensemble	Horizons	16,208	24.59	39,408	61.68
Thomas Dupont-Federici	New Popular Front	Generation.s	16,124	24.46		
Cédric Nouvelot	Miscellaneous right	The Republicans	10,655	16.17		
Jean-Alexis Géreux	Sovereigntist right	Debout la France	775	1.18		
Tony Desclos	Reconquête		662	1.00		
Isabelle Peltre	Far-left	Lutte Ouvrière	488	0.74		
Total			65,913	100.00	63,894	100.00
Valid votes			65,913	97.91	63,894	95.27
Invalid votes			453	0.67	769	1.15
Blank votes			952	1.41	2,402	3.58
Total votes			67,318	100.00	67,065	100.00
Registered voters/turnout			92,946	72.43	92,950	72.15

=== 6th constituency ===
Candidate	Party or alliance		First round		Second round	
Candidate	Party or alliance		Votes	%	Votes	%
Nicolas Calbrix	National Rally		24,077	36.62	27,851	43.64
Élisabeth Borne	Ensemble	Renaissance	19,213	29.22	35,962	56.36
Noé Gauchard	New Popular Front	La France Insoumise	15,376	23.38		
Lynda Lahalle	Miscellaneous centre	Independent	5,080	7.73		
Philippe Ambourg	Sovereigntist right	Debout la France	1,128	1.72		
Pascale Georget	Far-left	Lutte Ouvrière	616	0.94		
Bérengère Lareynie	Far-left	Miscellaneous left	262	0.40		
Total			65,752	100.00	63,813	100.00
Valid votes			65,752	96.62	63,813	93.09
Invalid votes			708	1.04	1,350	1.97
Blank votes			1,589	2.34	3,388	4.94
Total votes			68,049	100.00	68,551	100.00
Registered voters/turnout			96,333	70.64	96,357	71.14
