= Canton of Villers-Bocage, Calvados =

Coordinates: 49.0797°N 0.6553°W

Villers-Bocage
- Former canton
- Interactive map of Villers-Bocage
- Country: France
- Region: Normandy
- Department: Calvados
- No. of communes: {{{nbcomm}}}
- Disbanded: 2015
- Area: 142.13 km^{2} (54.88 sq mi)
- Population (2012): 10,613
  - Density: 74.671/km^{2} (193.40/sq mi)

The Canton of Villers-Bocage is a former canton situated in the department of Calvados and in the Lower Normandy region of northern France. It had 10,613 inhabitants (2012). It was disbanded following the French canton reorganisation which came into effect in March 2015.

== Geography ==
The canton was of Villers-Bocage organised around the commune of Villers-Bocage in the arrondissement of Caen. The canton comprised 22 communes.

== See also ==
- Arrondissements of the Calvados department
- Cantons of the Calvados department
- Communes of the Calvados department
