= Canton of Villers-Bocage =

The Canton of Villers-Bocage may refer to the following cantons:

- Canton of Villers-Bocage, Calvados
- Canton of Villers-Bocage, Somme
