= Jean-Marc Lefranc =

French politician

Member of the National Assembly for Calvados's 5th constituency
- In office 2002–2012
- Preceded by: Laurence Dumont
- Succeeded by: Isabelle Attard

Personal details
- Born: 20 February 1947 (age 79) Grandcamp-Maisy, France
- Party: UMP

Jean-Marc Lefranc (born February 20, 1947, in Grandcamp-Maisy) was a member of the National Assembly of France from 2002 to 2012. He represented the Calvados department, and is a member of the Union for a Popular Movement.
