= Bertrand Bouyx =

French politician (born 1970)

Member of the National Assembly for Calvados's 5th constituency
- Incumbent
- Assumed office 21 June 2017
- Preceded by: Isabelle Attard

Personal details
- Born: 26 May 1970 (age 56) Juvisy-sur-Orge, France
- Party: Horizons; Renaissance
- Education: University of Rennes 1 University of Paris-Sud
- Profession: Pharmacist

Bertrand Bouyx (born 26 May 1970) is a French politician of Renaissance who has been serving as a member of the French National Assembly since the 2017 elections, representing the 5th constituency of Calvados.

== Political career ==
In parliament, Bouyx serves on the Committee on Cultural Affairs and Education. He is also a member of the parliamentary friendship groups with Djibouti, the United Kingdom, and Lebanon.

In addition to his committee assignments, Bouyx has been a member of the French delegation to the Parliamentary Assembly of the Council of Europe since 2017. In this capacity, he has served on the Committee on Culture, Science, Education and Media (2019–2022); the Sub-Committee on Culture, Diversity and Heritage (2020–2022); and the Sub-Committee on the Europe Prize (2017–2019). Since 2022, he has been one of the Assembly’s vice-presidents, under the leadership of president Tiny Kox.

In September 2018, after François de Rugy's appointment to the government, Bouyx supported Barbara Pompili's candidacy for the presidency of the National Assembly.

In February 2024, Bouyx left the Renaissance group and instead joined the affiliated Horizons group.

== See also ==
- French legislative elections 2017
