= Claude Leteurtre =

French politician

Member of the National Assembly for Calvados's 3rd constituency
- In office 2002–2012
- Preceded by: Yvette Roudy
- Succeeded by: Clotilde Valter

Mayor of Falaise
- In office 1989–2005
- Preceded by: Paul German
- Succeeded by: Éric Macé

Personal details
- Born: 30 December 1940 (age 85) Donville-les-Bains, France
- Party: UDI

Claude Leteurtre (born 30 December 1940 in Donville-les-Bains, Manche) is a member of the National Assembly of France. He represents the Calvados department, and is a member of the New Centre.
