= Antoinette Gérard =

French poet, resistance fighter (1909–1958)

Antoinette Gérard (1909–1958), known as the Duchesse d'Harcourt through her marriage, was a French writer and resistance fighter, best known for her affair with actress and singer Arletty.

== Biography ==
Antoinette Gérard was the daughter of Baron François Gérard (1880–1929), deputy for Calvados from 1919 to 1928, and Catherine d'Aliney d'Elva (1888-1977).

In 1937, she published a collection of poems entitled Neiges ("Snows"), some of which were set to music by Henri Sauguet.

During the German occupation of France, she joined the French Resistance. Arrested by the Germans, she was imprisoned in Fresnes for a year.

She married François-Charles d'Harcourt on December 17, 1927, with whom she had two children, including the politician François d'Harcourt.

As a lesbian, she had an affair with the French actress Arletty.

She died in 1958.
