= Calvados's 4th constituency =

Constituency of the National Assembly of France

4th constituency of Calvados
- inline Constituency of the National Assembly of France

- Constituency in Department

- Calvados in France
- Deputy: Christophe Blanchet; MoDem
- Department: Calvados
- Cantons: Blangy-le-Château, Cabourg, Cambremer, Dozulé, Honfleur, Lisieux I (except the commune of Lisieux), Pont-l'Evêque, Trouville-sur-Mer

The 4th constituency of Calvados is a French legislative constituency in the Calvados département. Like the other 576 French constituencies, it elects one MP using the two-round system, with a run-off if no candidate receives over 50% of the vote in the first round.

== Historic representation ==
| Election | Member | Party |
|---|---|---|
| 1958 | Raymond Triboulet | UNR |
| 1962 | Raymond Triboulet | UNR |
| 1967 | Raymond Triboulet | UDR |
| 1968 | Raymond Triboulet | UDR |
| 1973 | François d'Harcourt | UDR |
| 1978 | François d'Harcourt | UDF |
| 1981 | François d'Harcourt | UDF |
| 1986 | Proportional representation - no election by constituency | |
| 1988 | Michel d'Ornano | UDF |
| 1993 | Nicole Ameline | UDF |
| 1997 | Nicole Ameline | UDF |
| 2002 | Nicole Ameline | UMP |
| 2007 | Nicole Ameline | UMP |
| 2012 | Nicole Ameline | UMP |
| 2017 | Christophe Blanchet | LREM |
| 2020 | Christophe Blanchet | MoDem |
| 2022 | Christophe Blanchet | MoDem |
| 2024 | Christophe Blanchet | MoDem |

== Election results ==
=== 2024 ===
| Candidate | Party | Alliance | First round | | Second round | |
| Candidate | Party | Alliance | Votes | % | Votes | % |
|---|---|---|---|---|---|---|
| Christophe Blanchet | MoDEM | Ensemble | 23,622 | 32.80 | 41,893 | 59.42 |
| Chantal Henry | RN | | 24,230 | 33.65 | 28,610 | 40.58 |
| Pierre Mouraret | PCF | NFP | 14,247 | 19.78 | | |
| Sophie Gaugain | DVD | | 7,847 | 10.90 | | |
| Pascale Deutsch | REC | | 878 | 1.22 | | |
| François Buisson | DLF | | 747 | 1.04 | | |
| Patrick Poirot Bourdain | LO | | 442 | 0.61 | | |
| Valid votes | | | 72,013 | 97,97 | 70,503 | 95.86 |
| Blank votes | | | 1,000 | 1.36 | 2,237 | 3.04 |
| Null votes | | | 492 | 0.67 | 811 | 1.10 |
| Turnout | | | 73,505 | 70.09 | 73,551 | 70.14 |
| Abstentions | | | 31,369 | 29.91 | 31,316 | 29.86 |
| Registered voters | | | 104,874 | | 104,867 | |
| Result | | | MoDEM HOLD | | | |

=== 2022 ===
Legislative Election 2022: Calvados's 4th constituency
| Party | Candidate | Votes | % | ±% |
|---|---|---|---|---|
| MoDem (Ensemble) | Christophe Blanchet | 19,101 | 36.44 | -3.28 |
| PCF (NUPÉS) | Pierre Mouraret | 11,865 | 22.64 | +1.75 |
| RN | Patrick Beloncle | 9,849 | 18.79 | +7.30 |
| LR (UDC) | Sophie Gaugain | 6,583 | 12.56 | −11.24 |
| REC | Florence Cothier | 2,221 | 4.24 | N/A |
| PA | Manuel Lorimier | 1,124 | 2.14 | N/A |
| Others | N/A | 1,674 | 3.19 | |
| Turnout | | 52,417 | 51.05 | −0.50 |
2nd round result
| MoDem (Ensemble) | Christophe Blanchet | 28,922 | 61.08 | +5.26 |
| PCF (NUPÉS) | Pierre Mouraret | 18,427 | 38.92 | N/A |
| Turnout | | 47,349 | 48.77 | +4.56 |
| MoDem hold | | | | |

=== 2017 ===
| Candidate | Label | First round | | Second round | |
| Candidate | Label | Votes | % | Votes | % |
|---|---|---|---|---|---|
| Christophe Blanchet | REM | 20,338 | 39.72 | 22,624 | 55.82 |
| Nicole Ameline | LR | 12,186 | 23.80 | 17,908 | 44.18 |
| Philippe Fouché-Saillenfest | FN | 5,884 | 11.49 | | |
| Xavier Madelaine | PS | 2,927 | 5.72 | | |
| Stéphane Poussier | FI | 2,837 | 5.54 | | |
| Pierre Mouraret | PCF | 2,814 | 5.50 | | |
| Sophie Börner | ECO | 2,113 | 4.13 | | |
| Alain Astresse | DLF | 960 | 1.87 | | |
| Caroline Derec | EXG | 393 | 0.77 | | |
| Louis Lagarde | DIV | 333 | 0.65 | | |
| Sophie Aguillé | EXD | 165 | 0.32 | | |
| Pascale Gros | DIV | 105 | 0.21 | | |
| Valentine Boyer | DVG | 102 | 0.20 | | |
| Véronique Rouillé | DVG | 50 | 0.10 | | |
| Votes | | 51,207 | 100.00 | 40,532 | 100.00 |
| Valid votes | | 51,207 | 98.36 | 40,532 | 90.77 |
| Blank votes | | 527 | 1.01 | 2,688 | 6.02 |
| Null votes | | 326 | 0.63 | 1,435 | 3.21 |
| Turnout | | 52,060 | 51.55 | 44,655 | 44.21 |
| Abstentions | | 48,928 | 48.45 | 56,355 | 55.79 |
| Registered voters | | 100,988 | | 101,010 | |
Source: Ministry of the Interior

=== 2012 ===
Summary of the 10 June and 17 June 2012 French legislative election in Calvados' 4th Constituency
| Candidate | Party | | 1st round | | 2nd round | |
| Candidate | Party | | Votes | % | Votes | % |
|---|---|---|---|---|---|---|
| Nicole Ameline | Union for a Popular Movement | UMP | 23,194 | 41.04% | 29,071 | 52.89% |
| Clémentine Le Marrec | Socialist Party | PS | 17,315 | 30.64% | 25,891 | 47.11% |
| Gilles Lebreton | Front National | FN | 7,120 | 12.60% | | |
| Pierre Mouraret | Left Front | FG | 4,957 | 8.77% | | |
| Pascal Chapelle | Europe Ecology – The Greens | EELV | 1,805 | 3.19% | | |
| Pierre-Claude Le Joncour | Miscellaneous Right | DVD | 873 | 1.54% | | |
| Arlette Girond | Miscellaneous Right | DVD | 678 | 1.20% | | |
| Caroline Derec | Far Left | EXG | 336 | 0.59% | | |
| Sophie Liard | Far Left | EXG | 240 | 0.42% | | |
| Total | | | 56,518 | 100% | 54,962 | 100% |
| Registered voters | | | 97,734 | | 97,731 | |
| Blank/Void ballots | | | 805 | 1.40% | 1,355 | 2.41% |
| Turnout | | | 57,323 | 58.65% | 56,317 | 57.62% |
| Abstentions | | | 40,411 | 41.35% | 41,414 | 42.38% |
| Result | | | | | UMP HOLD | |

=== 2007 ===
Legislative Election 2007: Calvados 4th
| Party | Candidate | Votes | % | ±% |
|---|---|---|---|---|
| UMP | Nicole Ameline | 26,446 | 53.37 | |
| PS | Damien Cesselin | 10,613 | 21.42 | |
| MoDem | Frédéric Chazal | 2,675 | 5.40 | |
| PCF | Pierre Mouraret | 2,307 | 4.66 | |
| FN | Colette Gadiot | 1,830 | 3.69 | |
| CPNT | Emmanuelle Marie | 1,459 | 2.94 | |
| LV | Nicole Fernandez-Bravo | 1,271 | 2.56 | |
| MPF | Maryse Bouvard | 747 | 1.51 | |
| LCR | Michel Sidorchouk | 704 | 1.42 | |
| DVD | Christophe Menard | 429 | 0.87 | |
| LO | Patrick Poirot-Bourdain | 400 | 0.81 | |
| Independent | Magda Maffezzoli | 359 | 0.72 | |
| Far left | Georges Marchand | 255 | 0.51 | |
| DVD | David Simhon | 58 | 0.12 | |
| Turnout | | 50,394 | 61.72 | |
| UMP hold | | Swing | | |

=== 2002 ===
Legislative Election 2002: Calvados's 4th constituency
| Party | Candidate | Votes | % | ±% |
|---|---|---|---|---|
| UMP | Nicole Ameline | 23,980 | 50.02 | |
| PS | Catherine Le Galiot | 10,310 | 21.51 | |
| FN | Nelly Thomas | 4,979 | 10.39 | |
| CPNT | Nadine Dombis | 2,080 | 4.34 | |
| PCF | Pierre Mouraret | 2,053 | 4.28 | |
| Others | N/A | 4,537 | | |
| Turnout | | 48,723 | 64.44 | |
| UMP gain from UDF | | | | |

=== 1997 ===
Legislative Election 1997: Calvados's 4th constituency
| Party | Candidate | Votes | % | ±% |
|---|---|---|---|---|
| UDF | Nicole Ameline | 16,993 | 37.55 | |
| PS | Marie-Rose Koro | 11,331 | 25.04 | |
| FN | Christian Gueret de Manoir | 6,269 | 13.85 | |
| PCF | Pierre Mouraret | 3,814 | 8.43 | |
| LV | Françoise Morin | 2,018 | 4.46 | |
| DVD | Françoise Gay | 1,938 | 4.28 | |
| MPF | Aymeric Blasselle | 1,577 | 3.48 | |
| MEI | Michel Rousseau | 903 | 2.00 | |
| DIV | Richard Halley | 415 | 0.92 | |
| Turnout | | 47,374 | 67.85 | |
2nd round result
| UDF | Nicole Ameline | 26,347 | 54.96 | |
| PS | Marie-Rose Koro | 21,590 | 45.04 | |
| Turnout | | 50,414 | 72.20 | |
| UDF hold | | | | |

== Sources ==
- Official results of French elections from 1998: "Résultats électoraux officiels en France" (in French).
