= Saint-Vaast-en-Auge =

- Commune
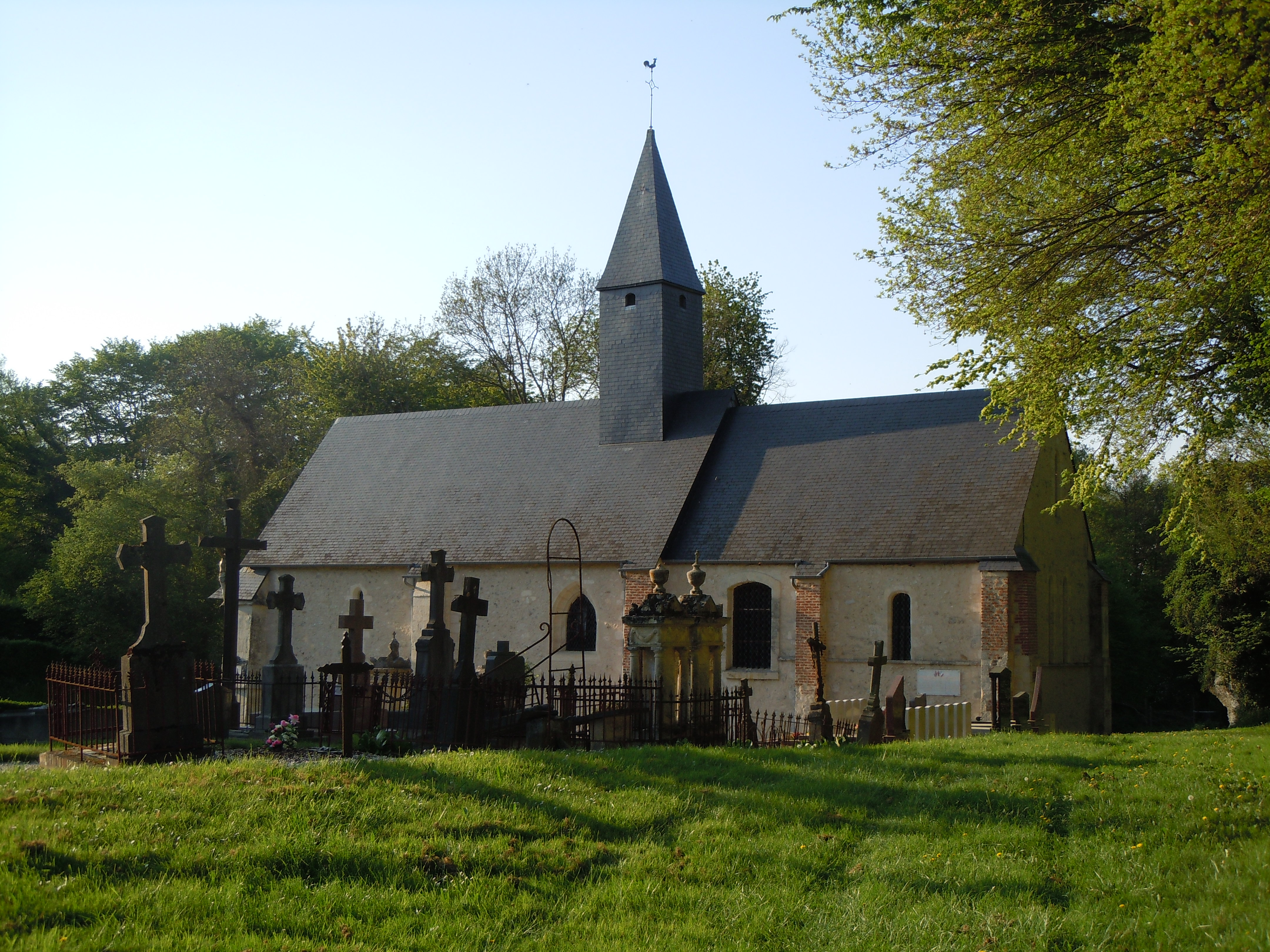
- The church in Saint-Vaast-en-Auge

- Coat of arms
- Location of Saint-Vaast-en-Auge
- Location within France Location within Normandy
- Coordinates: 49°17′32″N 0°00′14″W
- Country: France
- Region: Normandy
- Department: Calvados
- Arrondissement: Lisieux
- Canton: Cabourg
- Intercommunality: CC Normandie-Cabourg-Pays d'Auge

Government
  - Mayor (2020–2026): Philippe Blavette
- Area^{1}: 2.98 km^{2} (1.15 sq mi)
- Elevation: 124 m (407 ft)
- Highest elevation: 147 m (482 ft)
- Lowest elevation: 64 m (210 ft)
- Population (2023): 125
  - Density: 41.9/km^{2} (109/sq mi)
- Time zone: UTC+01:00 (CET)
  - Summer (DST): UTC+02:00 (CEST)
- INSEE/Postal code: 14660 /14640
- ^{1} French Land Register data, which excludes lakes, ponds, glaciers > 1 km^{2} (0.386 sq mi or 247 acres) and river estuaries.

Saint-Vaast-en-Auge (French pronunciation: [sɛ̃ va(st) ɑ̃.n‿oʒ], literally Saint-Vaast in Auge) is a commune in the Calvados department in the Normandy region in northwestern France.

== Population ==
Historical population
Year	Pop.	±% p.a.
1968	92	—
1975	84	−1.29%
1982	88	+0.67%
1990	82	−0.88%
1999	81	−0.14%
2007	95	+2.01%
2012	100	+1.03%
2017	95	−1.02%
2023	125	+4.68%
Source: INSEE

== Personalities ==
- Nicole Ameline, politician, was born here, 1952.

== See also ==
- Communes of the Calvados department
