= Nathalie Porte =

French politician

Member of the Regional Council of Normandy
- Incumbent
- Assumed office 4 January 2016
- President: Hervé Morin

Member of the National Assembly for Calvados's 3rd constituency
- In office 28 July 2020 – 19 June 2022
- Preceded by: Sébastien Leclerc
- Succeeded by: Jérémie Patrier-Leitus

Personal details
- Born: 2 February 1973 (age 52); Rodez, France
- Political party: The Republicans

Nathalie Porte (born 2 February 1973) is a French politician. She served as a member of the National Assembly representing the Calvados's 3rd constituency between 2020 and 2022 and is a member of The Republicans. She lost her seat in the first round of the 2022 French legislative election.
