= Yvette Roudy =

French politician (1929–2026)

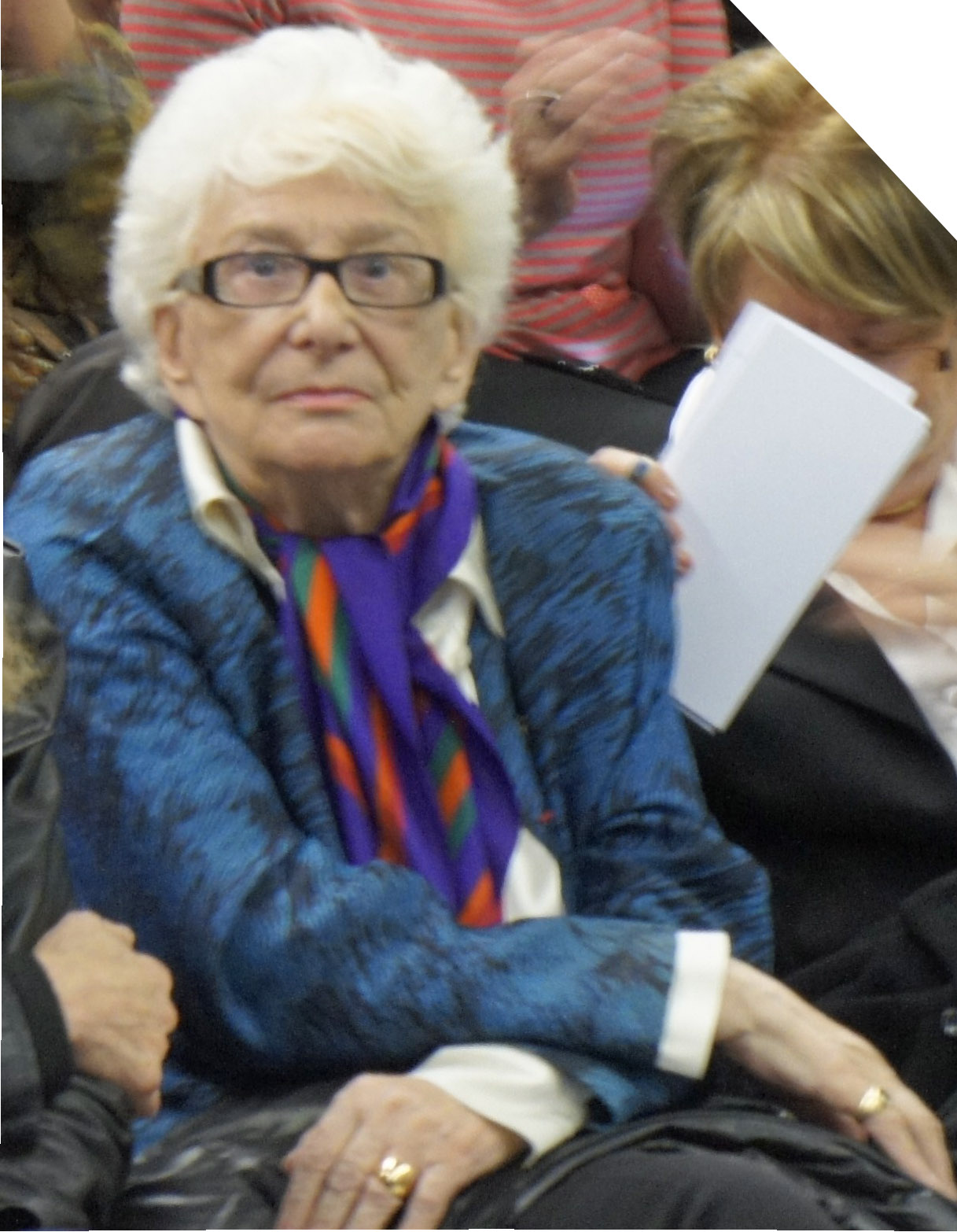
- Roudy in 2012

Minister of Women's Rights
- In office 21 May 1981 – 20 March 1986
- President: François Mitterrand
- Prime Minister: Pierre Mauroy; Laurent Fabius
- Preceded by: Alice Saunier-Seité
- Succeeded by: Georgina Dufoix

Mayor of Lisieux
- In office 24 March 1989 – 25 March 2001
- Preceded by: André-Eugène Baugé
- Succeeded by: Bernard Aubril

Member of the National Assembly for Calvados's 3rd constituency
- In office 12 June 1997 – 18 June 2002
- Preceded by: André Fanton
- Succeeded by: Claude Leteurtre

Personal details
- Born: Yvette Saldou; 10 April 1929 Pessac, France
- Died: 18 August 2026 (aged 97) Cabestany, France
- Party: Socialist Party
- Spouse: Pierre Roudy (m. 1951)

Yvette Roudy (10 April 1929 – 18 August 2026) was a French politician. She served as a member of the National Assembly from 1986 to 1993, and from 1997 to 2002, representing Calvados. She was the Minister of Women's Rights from 1981 to 1986.

Roudy sponsored a law known as the "Roudy law" in 1983. This law had in it a ban on refusing promotion, training, or employment based on sex, and put the burden of proof on the employer (rather than the employee as it had previously been) regarding any conflict between the employee and their employer. The law also required employers to make a written report of “the measures taken during the past year to ensure gender equality in the workplace, the objectives planned for the coming year, and the definition of… the actions to be taken in this regard”.

Roudy died on 18 August 2026, aged 97.
