= Nicole Ameline =

French politician, lawyer, diplomat (born 1952)

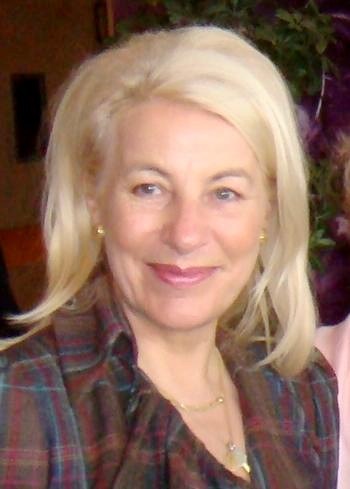
- Nicole Ameline in 2008

Chair of the Committee on the Elimination of Discrimination against Women
- Incumbent
- Assumed office 2013
- Secretary-General: Ban Ki-moon; António Guterres

Minister for Parity and Professional Equality
- In office 17 June 2002 – 31 May 2005
- President: Jacques Chirac
- Prime Minister: Jean-Pierre Raffarin
- Succeeded by: Catherine Vautrin

Member of the National Assembly for Calvados's 4th constituency
- In office 20 June 2007 – 20 June 2017
- Preceded by: Yves Boisseau
- Succeeded by: Christophe Blanchet

Personal details
- Born: 4 July 1952 (age 74) Saint-Vaast-en-Auge, France
- Party: UMP
- Education: University of Caen

Nicole Ameline (born 4 July 1952) is a French politician, lawyer, diplomat and women's rights advocate. She served as a member of the National Assembly of France for several terms between 1991 and 2017, and held various roles in the Government of France from 1995; she was Minister of the Sea in 2002 and Minister of Gender Equality from 2002 to 2005. She has been a member of the United Nations Committee on the Elimination of Discrimination against Women since 2008 and was the committee's chairperson from 2013.

She represented the department of Calvados as a member of The Republicans.

Ameline also currently serves as the chair of the International Institute of Human Rights and Peace, Normandy.

== Biography ==
Titled a Doctor of Law, specialising in the environment, she entered the office of the Minister for the Environment, Michel d'Ornano. A powerful man from Calvados, he convinced her to invest in her native department. After administrative posts at Honfleur then on the General council of Calvados, she entered politics as deputy to Michel d'Ornano on the National Assembly of France in 1988, and took over from him on his death in 1991.

In 1993, with Yves Boisseau as deputy, she was elected with a large majority in the second round on the UDF ticket. She was opposed by a National Front candidate, and on the left by Corinne Lepage, who failed to qualify for the second round.

In May 1995, with the victory of Jacques Chirac, she left her post in order to enter the Government of Alain Juppé. The same year, she headed the Hornfleur Majorité Présidentielle list for the municipality, but lost by 37 votes to an independent ecologist. She left the government in November with the other "Juppettes" and she easily regained her seat in December.

Re-elected following the dissolution of 1997, she was the only member on the Calvados right. The following year, she joined the Regional Council of Lower Normandy, as vice president, deputy to René Garrec, president of the region since 1986.

Re-elected as a member in 2002 under the banner of the Union pour la majorité présidentielle, newly created from the UMP, she was a minister in the Raffarin government, responsible for the Sea for one month, then had full responsibility for Parity and Professional Equality, up until Jean-Pierre Raffarin's resignation on 31 May 2005.

She lost her seat in the 2017 French legislative election.
