= Calvados's 5th constituency =

Constituency of the National Assembly of France

5th constituency of Calvados
- inline Constituency of the National Assembly of France

- Constituency in Department

- Calvados in France
- Deputy: Bertrand Bouyx; RE
- Department: Calvados
- Cantons: Balleroy, Bayeux, Caumont-l'Éventé, Creully, Douvres-la-Délivrande, Isigny-sur-Mer, Ryes, Trévières
- Registered voters: 111,679

The 5th constituency of Calvados is a French legislative constituency in the Calvados département. Like the other 576 French constituencies, it elects one MP using the two-round system, with a run-off if no candidate receives over 50% of the vote in the first round.

== Description ==
It includes Bayeux, famous for its tapestry.

== Deputies ==
Election	Member	Party
1958	Jacques Le Roy Ladurie	CNIP
1962	André Halbout	UNR
1967	Marcel Restout	DVD
1968	Olivier Stirn	UDR
1973	Olivier Stirn	UDF
1978	Olivier Stirn	UDF
1981	Olivier Stirn	UDF
1986	Proportional representation - no election by constituency	
1988	François d'Harcourt	UDF
1993	François d'Harcourt	UDF
1997	Laurence Dumont	PS
2002	Jean-Marc Lefranc	UMP
2007	Jean-Marc Lefranc	UMP
2012	Isabelle Attard	EELV
2013	Isabelle Attard	ND
2015	Isabelle Attard	DVG
2017	Bertrand Bouyx	LREM
2022	Bertrand Bouyx	RE

== Election results ==
=== 2024 ===
Candidate	Party	Alliance	First round		Second round	
Candidate	Party	Alliance	Votes	%	Votes	%
Bertrand Bouyx	HOR	Ensemble	16,209	24.59	39,408	61.68
Philippe Chapron	RN		21,001	31.86	24,486	38.32
Thomas Dupont-Federici	G.s	NFP	16,124	24.46		
Cédric Nouvelot	LR	UDC	10,655	16.17		
Jean-Alexis Géreux	DLF		775	1.18		
Tony Desclos	REC		662	1.00		
Isabelle Peltre	LO		488	0.74		
Valid votes			65,913	97.91	63,894	95.27
Blank votes			952	1.41	2,402	3.58
Null votes			453	0.67	769	1.15
Turnout			67,318	72.43	67,065	72.15
Abstentions			25,628	27.57	25,885	27.85
Registered voters			92,946		92,950	
Result			HOR HOLD			

=== 2022 ===
Legislative Election 2022: Calvados's 5th constituency
Party	Candidate	Votes	%	±%
LREM (Ensemble)	Bertrand Bouyx	13,515	27.85	-11.10
EELV (NUPÉS)	Valérie Harel	11,256	23.19	+20.43
RN	Philippe Chapron	9,241	19.04	+6.35
LR (UDC)	Cédric Nouvelot	8,733	17.99	−5.16
PRG	Xavier Brunschvicg	2,160	4.45	N/A
REC	Philippe Mesguich	1,572	3.24	N/A
Others	N/A	2,058	4.24	
Turnout		48,535	53.32	−0.22
2nd round result
LREM (Ensemble)	Bertrand Bouyx	24,237	55.68	+0.35
EELV (NUPÉS)	Valérie Harel	19,291	44.32	N/A
Turnout		43,528	51.14	+5.56
LREM hold				

=== 2017 ===
Candidate	Label	First round		Second round	
Candidate	Label	Votes	%	Votes	%
Bertrand Bouyx	REM	18,388	38.95	20,358	55.33
Cédric Nouvelot	LR	10,926	23.15	16,439	44.67
Isabelle Attard	DVG	8,593	18.20		
Christine Bisson	FN	5,991	12.69		
Christophe Sady	ECO	1,304	2.76		
Isabelle Peltre	EXG	830	1.76		
Éric Beaudoin	DLF	664	1.41		
Yves Rouillé	DVG	255	0.54		
Simon Gervais	DIV	253	0.54		
Votes		47,204	100.00	36,797	100.00
Valid votes		47,204	97.99	36,797	89.69
Blank votes		694	1.44	2,994	7.30
Null votes		274	0.57	1,236	3.01
Turnout		48,172	53.54	41,027	45.58
Abstentions		41,808	46.46	48,975	54.42
Registered voters		89,980		90,002	
Source: Ministry of the Interior

=== 2012 ===
Summary of the 10 June and 17 June 2012 French legislative election in Calvados’ 5th Constituency
Candidate	Party		1st round		2nd round	
Candidate	Party		Votes	%	Votes	%
Isabelle Attard	Europe Ecology – The Greens	EELV	11,074	21.47%	25,683	50.71%
Cédric Nouvelot	Union for a Popular Movement	UMP	12,391	24.02%	24,960	49.29%
Jean-Pierre Lavisse	Miscellaneous Left	DVG	10,048	19.48%		
Patrick Gomont	New Centre-Presidential Majority	NCE	8,241	15.98%		
Philippe Chapron	Front National	FN	5,798	11.24%		
Mireille Brun	Left Front	FG	1,960	3.80%		
Anne Boissel	Miscellaneous Right	DVD	1,012	1.96%		
Jean-Michel Sady	Ecologist	ECO	514	1.00%		
Charline Joliveau	Far Left	EXG	248	0.48%		
Michel Moisan	Far Left	EXG	231	0.45%		
Aurélien Detey	Far Left	EXG	68	0.13%		
Total			51,585	100%	50,643	100%
Registered voters			86,425		86,425	
Blank/Void ballots			704	1.35%	1,536	2.94%
Turnout			52,289	60.50%	52,179	60.37%
Abstentions			34,136	39.50%	34,246	39.63%
Result					EELV gain from UMP	

=== 2007 ===
Summary of the 10 June and 17 June 2007 French legislative election in Calvados’ 5th Constituency
Candidate	Party		1st round		2nd round	
Candidate	Party		Votes	%	Votes	%
Jean-Marc Lefranc	Union for a Popular Movement	UMP	30,266	48.43%	33,842	55.69%
Nathalie Le Moal	Socialist Party	PS	15,831	25.33%	26,931	44.31%
Christine Delecroix	Democratic Movement	MoDem	5,310	8.50%		
Valérie Dupont	Front National	FN	2,117	3.39%		
Olivier Joliton	The Greens	VEC	1,888	3.02%		
Paul Marie	Hunting, Fishing, Nature, Traditions	CPNT	1,596	2.55%		
Sylvanie Ramond	Far Left	EXG	1,035	1.66%		
Thierry Besnard	Communist	PCF	1,023	1.64%		
Stéphane Royer	Far Left	EXG	893	1.43%		
Charline Joliveau	Far Left	EXG	450	0.72%		
Caroline De Villiers	Movement for France	MPF	446	0.71%		
Alain Champain	Ecologist	ECO	426	0.68%		
France Devigne	Independent	DIV	373	0.60%		
Didier Bergar	Far Left	EXG	334	0.53%		
Micheline Dumesges	Far Right	EXD	251	0.40%		
Pascal Blanchetier	Miscellaneous Left	DVG	250	0.40%		
Total			62,489	100%	60,773	100%
Registered voters			101,401		101,406	
Blank/Void ballots			919	1.45%	1,294	2.08%
Turnout			63,408	62.53%	62,067	61.21%
Abstentions			37,993	37.47%	39,339	38.79%
Result					UMP GAIN FROM UDF	

=== 2002 ===
Legislative Election 2002: Calvados's 5th constituency
Party	Candidate	Votes	%	±%
UDF	Jean-Marc Lefranc	24,451	41.59	+7.21
LV	Marie-Anne Robert-Kerbrat	11,676	19.86	+15.79
FN	Chantal Simonot	5,376	9.14	−2.54
DVG	Daniel Francoise	4,993	8.49	N/A
CPNT	Jean-Noël Blet	3,383	5.75	N/A
LCR	David Bodet	1,627	2.77	N/A
MPF	Thierry Brac de la Perriere	1,530	2.60	−0.78
Others	N/A	5,761		
Turnout		59,987	63.54	
2nd round result
UDF	Jean-Marc Lefranc	32,137	59.90	+11.01
LV	Marie-Anne Robert-Kerbrat	21,512	40.10	N/A
Turnout		55,597	58.89	
UDF gain from PS				

=== 1997 ===
Legislative Election 1997: Calvados's 5th constituency
Party	Candidate	Votes	%	±%
UDF	François d'Harcourt	19,396	34.38	
PS	Laurence Dumont	16,981	30.10	
FN	Robert Henri	6,588	11.68	
PCF	Geneviève Le Fort	3,518	6.24	
DIV	Patrick Rossigneux	2,667	4.73	
LV	Bernard Hérard	2,298	4.07	
MPF	Claude Perrod	1,909	3.38	
GE	Serge Fouassier	1,361	2.41	
Others	N/A	1,703		
Turnout		59,075	68.23	
2nd round result
PS	Laurence Dumont	30,639	51.11	
UDF	François d'Harcourt	29,313	48.89	
Turnout		62,662	72.37	
PS gain from UDF				

== Sources ==
- Official results of French elections from 1998: "Résultats électoraux officiels en France" (in French).
