= François d'Harcourt =

French politician (1928–2020)

François d'Harcourt, 12th Duke of Harcourt

Member of the French National Assembly for Calvados's 4th constituency and Calvados's 5th constituency
- In office 2 April 1973 – 21 April 1997
- Preceded by: Raymond Triboulet
- Succeeded by: Laurence Dumont

General Councillor of Calvados
- In office 1967–1994

Personal details
- Born: 10 December 1928 Paris, France
- Died: 5 November 2020 (aged 91) Annecy, France
- Party: UDF

François d'Harcourt (10 December 1928 – 5 November 2020), 12th Duke of Harcourt, was a French politician.

== Biography ==
He was the son of François-Charles d'Harcourt, 11th Duke of Harcourt, and Antoinette Gérard, a French resistant. From 1954 to 1955, François served as Chief of Cabinet of the Ministry of Armed Forces. Also a journalist, he was an editor for Jours de France from 1956 to 1958. He was a major reporter abroad in Africa in 1960 and Asia in 1962.

D'Harcourt was elected General Councillor of the Canton of Balleroy, serving from 1955 to 1958 and again from 1967 to 1994. He was elected to the National Assembly for Calvados's 4th constituency on 11 March 1973. He was reelected continuously until 1986. He was a member of the Union for French Democracy and was part of the Centrist Union of Democrats for Progress. On 17 January 1975, he voted to decriminalize abortion under the "Veil Law". In 1988, he was elected to serve for Calvados's 5th constituency, where he remained until 1997.

After his father's death in 1997, d'Harcourt became the head of the House of Harcourt. He was married to Isabelle Roubeau. He died in Annecy, on 5 November 2020, at the age of 91.

== Works ==
- L'Afrique à l'heure H (1960)
- Asie, réveil d'un monde (1963)
- Demain, la France, l'Europe, le Monde (1965)
