= Sébastien Leclerc (politician) =

French politician

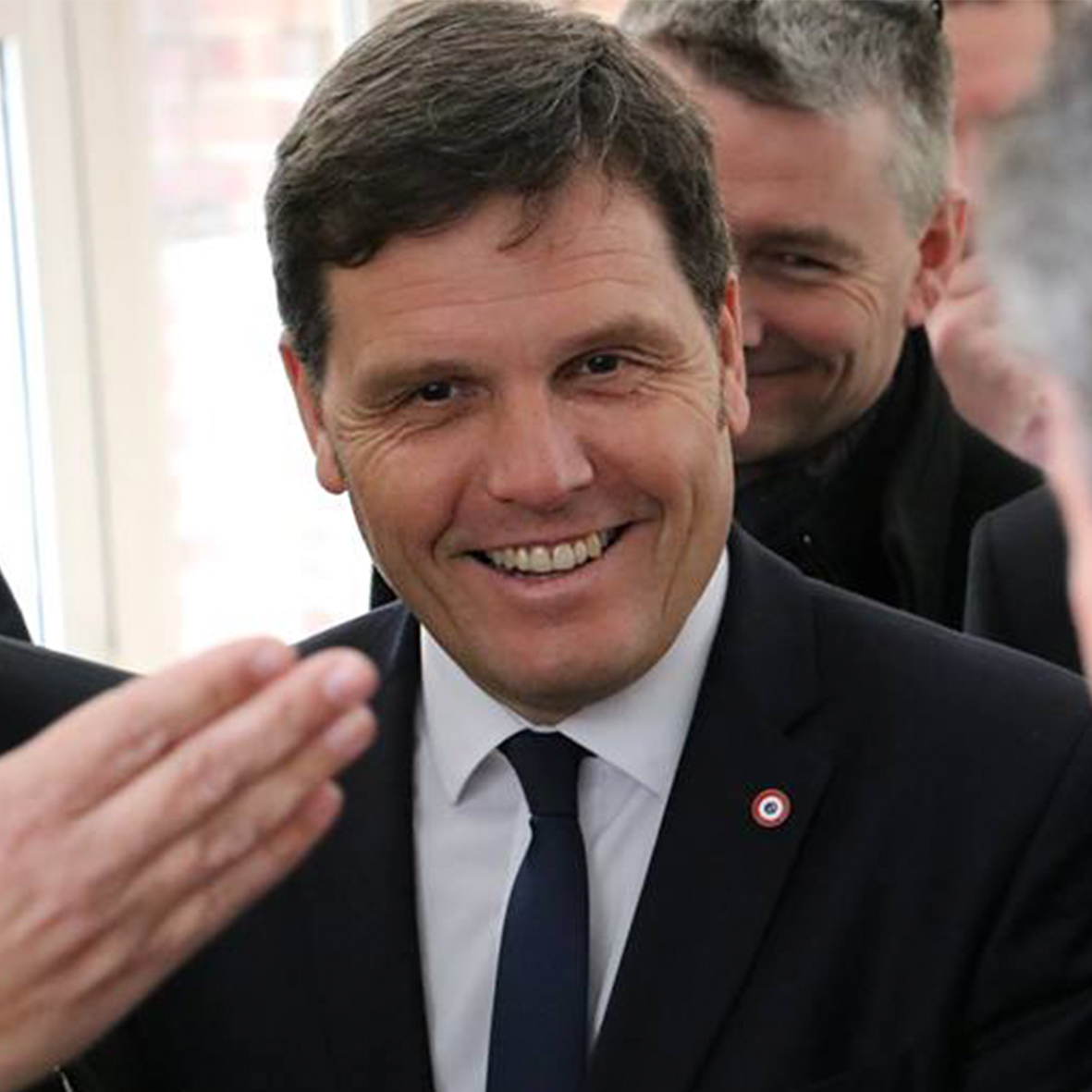

Mayor of Lisieux
- Incumbent
- Assumed office 28 June 2020
- Preceded by: Bernard Aubril

Member of the National Assembly for Calvados's 3rd constituency
- In office 21 June 2017 – 27 July 2020
- Preceded by: Clotilde Valter
- Succeeded by: Nathalie Porte

Personal details
- Born: 28 March 1970 (age 56) Lisieux, France
- Party: The Republicans

Sébastien Leclerc (French pronunciation: [sebastjɛ̃ ləklɛʁ]; born 28 March 1970) is a French politician and member of The Republicans. In June 2017, he was elected to serve as Deputy for the 3rd constituency of Calvados in the French National Assembly. He was elected mayor of Lisieux on 28 June 2020.

== See also ==
- French legislative elections 2017
