= Raymond Triboulet =

French politician

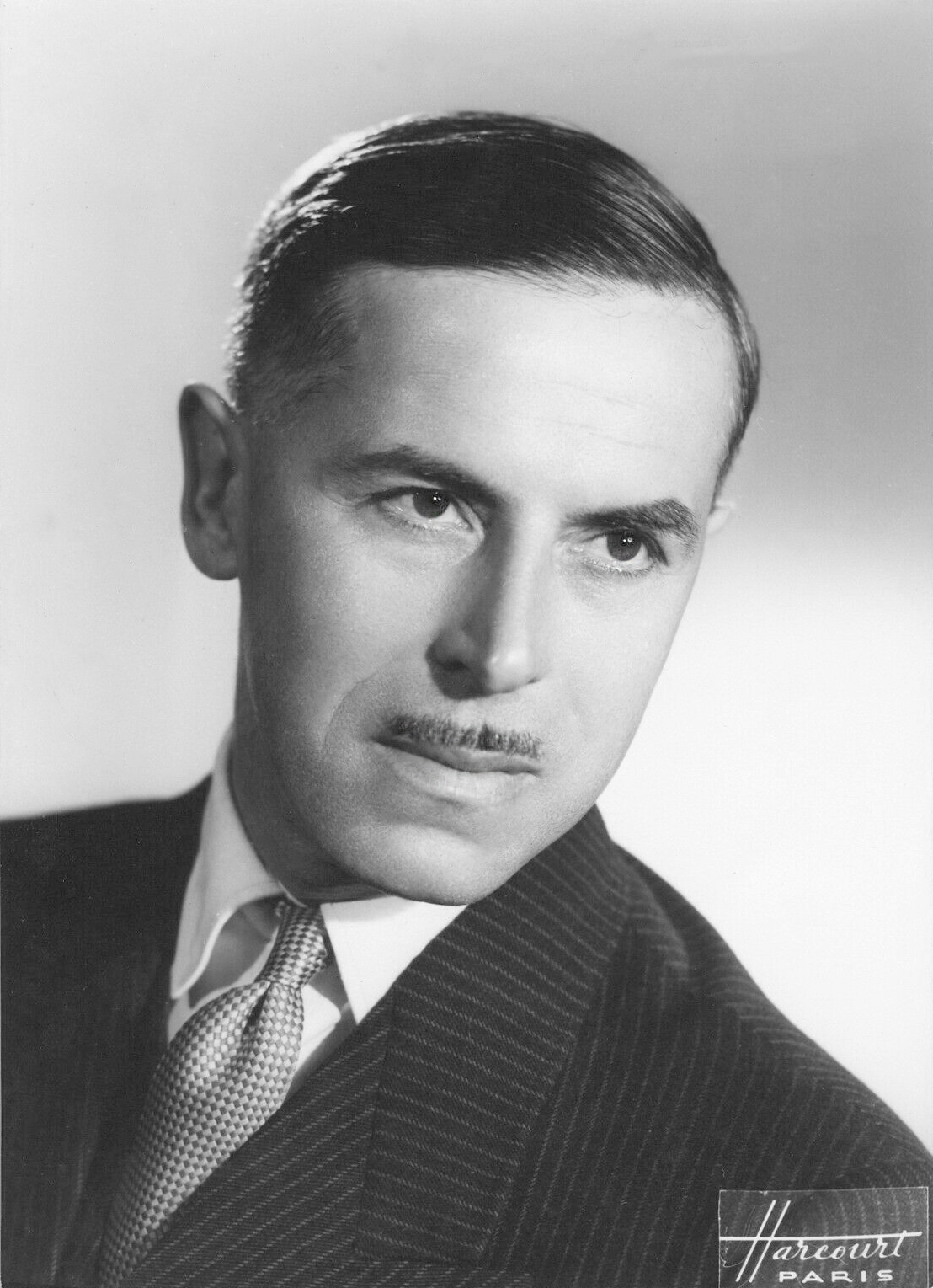

Member of the National Assembly for Calvados
- In office 1946–1973
- Succeeded by: François d'Harcourt

Personal details
- Born: 3 October 1906 Paris, France
- Died: 26 May 2006 (aged 99) Sèvres, France
- Party: UDR

Raymond Triboulet (3 October 1906 – 26 May 2006) was a French politician. He was a leading World War II resistance fighter who helped U.S., Canadian, and British troops invade France, which was then occupied by Nazi Germany.

== Biography ==
Born in Paris, Raymond Triboulet was a farmer and also had a law degree. At the start of World War II he enlisted in the French Army and was taken prisoner, but was later freed and returned home under the German occupation in 1941. He then joined the Calvados section of the group "Ceux de la Résistance", or Those of the Resistance.

By informing Allied forces of German movements between the towns of Caen and Bayeux, he contributed to the success of the D-Day landings of 6 June 1944. Following the reinstatement of a legitimate French government, Charles de Gaulle appointed him the first local governor of liberated France, in the Normandy town of Bayeux.

He was elected to Parliament in 1946 and served until 1973. He served as a minister in the governments of Michel Debré and Georges Pompidou from 1959 to 1966 and then became a member of the Council of Europe and the European Parliament.

He was elected to the Académie des sciences morales et politiques in 1979, serving as its president in 1991.

== Publications ==
- Un gaulliste de la IVe, Plon, 1985 (A Gaullist from the IVth Republic)
- Un ministre du Général, Plon, 1985 (Minister to the General)
