= André Fanton =

French politician (1928–2025)

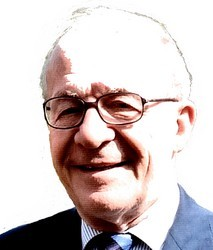
- Fanton in 2012

Deputy of the French National Assembly
- In office 2 April 1993 – 21 April 1997
- Preceded by: Yvette Roudy
- Succeeded by: Yvette Roudy
- Constituency: Calvados's 3rd constituency
- In office 2 April 1986 – 14 May 1988
- Constituency: proportional representation
- In office 2 April 1973 – 2 April 1978
- Preceded by: Michel Marquet
- Succeeded by: Alain Devaquet
- Constituency: Paris's 9th constituency
- In office 9 December 1958 – 22 July 1969
- Preceded by: constituency established
- Succeeded by: Michel Marquet
- Constituency: Paris's 9th constituency

Member of the European Parliament for France
- In office 24 July 1984 – 24 July 1989
- In office 26 June 1980 – 16 April 1982

Member of the General Council of Calvados for the Canton of Lisieux-3
- In office 22 March 1985 – 1 April 2004
- Preceded by: canton established
- Succeeded by: Brigitte Comet-Chérel

Personal details
- Born: 31 March 1928; Gentilly, France
- Died: 19 June 2025 (aged 97); Paris, France
- Political party: UNR; UDR; RPR
- Occupation: Lawyer

André Fanton (French: [ɑ̃dʁe fɑ̃tɔ̃]; 31 March 1928 – 19 June 2025) was a French politician of the Union for the New Republic (UNR), Union of Democrats for the Republic (UDR), and the Rally for the Republic (RPR).

== Life and career ==
Born in Gentilly on 31 March 1928, Fanton earned a Licence de droit and was admitted to the Paris Bar Association. He served four terms in the National Assembly; from 1958 to 1969, 1973 to 1978, 1986 to 1988, and 1993 to 1997. He also served two terms in the European Parliament from 1980 to 1982 and from 1984 to 1989. While in office, he made no secret of his hostility toward the creation of a Federal Europe.

Fanton died in Paris on 19 June 2025, at the age of 97.
