= Laurence Dumont =

French politician

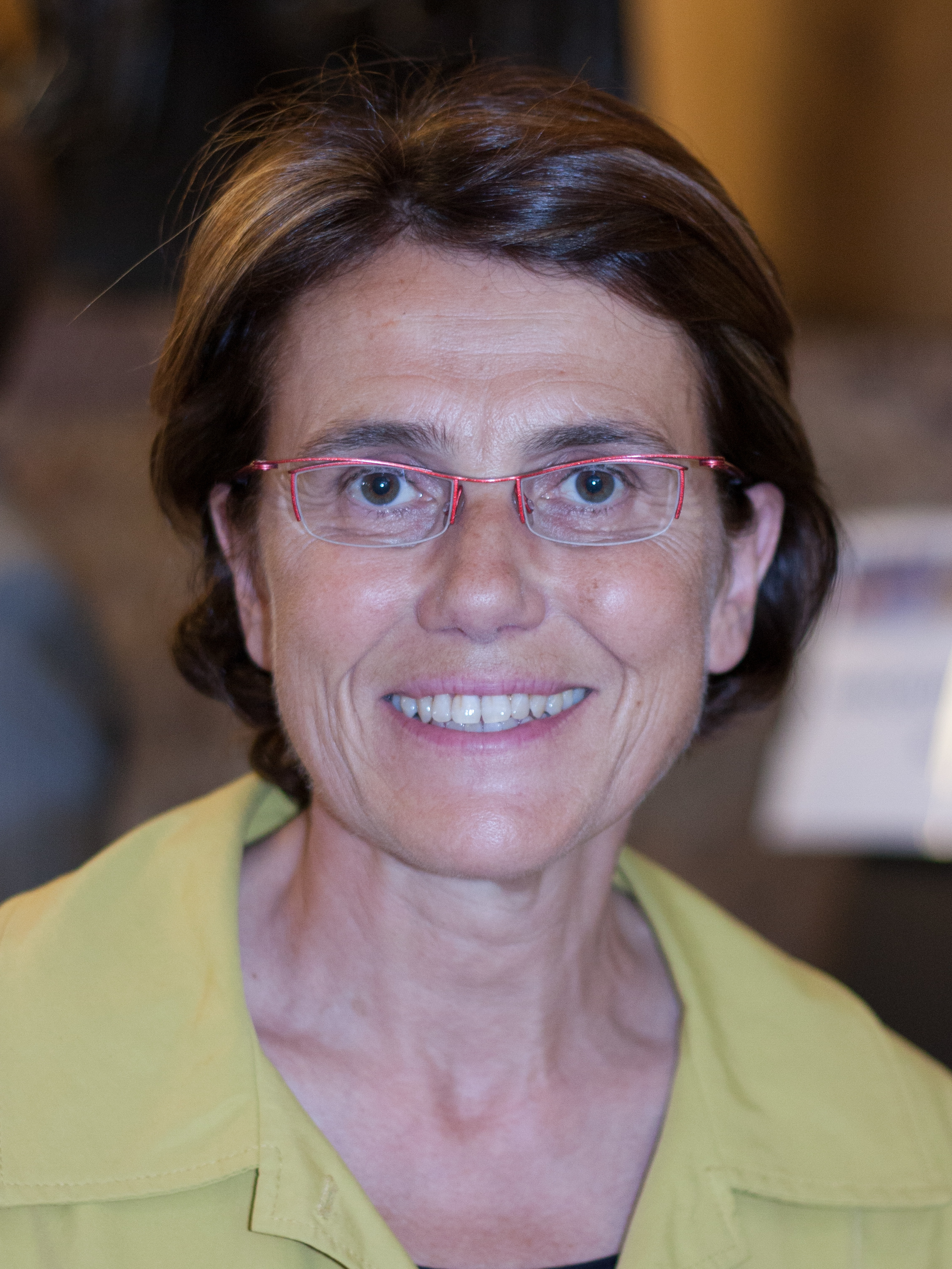
- Laurence Dumont in 2012

Member of the National Assembly
- In office 17 June 2007 – 19 June 2022
- Preceded by: Rodolphe Thomas
- Succeeded by: Arthur Delaporte
- Parliamentary group: SOC
- Constituency: Calvados's 2nd constituency
- In office 12 June 1997 – 19 June 2002
- Preceded by: François d'Harcourt
- Succeeded by: Jean-Marc Lefranc
- Parliamentary group: SOC
- Constituency: Calvados's 5th constituency

Secretary of the Foreign Affairs Committee of the National Assembly
- In office 29 June 2017 – 21 June 2022
- President: Marielle de Sarnez; Jean-Louis Bourlanges

Vice-president of the National Assembly
- In office 3 October 2011 – 20 June 2017
- President: Bernard Accoyer; Claude Bartolone

Member of the Regional Council of Lower Normandy
- In office 21 March 1998 – 17 April 2001

Personal details
- Born: 2 June 1958 (age 67) Vincennes, France
- Party: Socialist Party

Laurence Dumont (born 2 June 1958) is a French politician of the Socialist Party who has been serving as Member of Parliament of the National Assembly from 1997 until 2002 and again between 2007 and 2022, representing the 2nd constituency of Calvados.

== Political career ==
In parliament, Dumont has served on the Committee on Foreign Affairs from 1997 to 2001 and again since 2017. She was also a member of the Committee on Social Affairs (2009-2012) and the Committee on Legal Affairs (2012-2017). Since 2011, she has also been serving as vice president of the National Assembly.

In the Socialist Party's 2017 presidential primaries, Dumont publicly endorsed Benoît Hamon as the party's candidate for the 2017 French presidential election.

== See also ==
- 2017 French legislative election
