= Calvados's 3rd constituency =

Constituency of the National Assembly of France

3rd constituency of Calvados
- inline Constituency of the National Assembly of France

- Constituency in Department

- Calvados in France
- Deputy: Jérémie Patrier-Leitus; Horizons
- Department: Calvados
- Cantons: Bretteville-sur-Laize, Falaise Nord, Falaise Sud, Lisieux II, Livarot, Mézidon-Canon, Morteaux-Couliboeuf, Orbec, Saint-Pierre-sur-Dives and the part of the commune of Lisieux not in Lisieux I

The 3rd constituency of Calvados is a French legislative constituency in the Calvados département. Like the other 576 French constituencies, it elects one MP using the two-round system, with a run-off if no candidate receives over 50% of the vote in the first round.

Unlike the 1st and 2nd, it resembles the 4th, 5th, and 6th constituencies in a significant proportion of its private sector underpinned by agriculture; it includes most of Lisieux and all of the town of Falaise, between Paris and Caen.

Similarly connected to Paris by road, it takes circa 2 hours train travel from Lisieux to Paris by train, circa 158 km, with most days seeing 15 trains each way per day.

== Historic representation ==
Election	Member	Party
1958	Edmond Duchesne	CNIP
1962	Edmond Duchesne	RI
1966	André Plantain	UDR
1967	Michel d'Ornano	RI
1968	Michel d'Ornano	RI
1973	Michel d'Ornano	RI
1974	Jacques Richomme	RI
1978	Michel d'Ornano	UDF
1978	Jacques Richomme	UDF
1981	Michel d'Ornano	UDF
1986	Proportional representation - no election by constituency	
1988	Yvette Roudy	PS
1993	André Fanton	RPR
1997	Yvette Roudy	PS
2002	Claude Leteurtre	UDF
2007	Claude Leteurtre	NC
2012	Clotilde Valter	PS
2015	Guy Bailliart	PS
2017	Sébastien Leclerc	LR
2020	Nathalie Porte	LR
2022	Jérémie Patrier-Leitus	H
2024	Jérémie Patrier-Leitus	H

== Election results ==
=== 2024 ===
Candidate	Party	Alliance	First round		Second round	
Candidate	Party	Alliance	Votes	%	Votes	%
Jérémie Patrier-Leitus	HOR	Ensemble	19,144	36.46	28,545	54.78
Edouard Fauvage	RN		21,575	41.09	23,562	45.22
Olivier Truffaut	PS	NFP	9,959	18.97		
Steven Mafiodo	DLF		1,080	2.06		
Michel Langevin	LO		732	1.39		
Thierry-Paul Valette	DIV		12	0.02		
Valid votes			52,502	97.40	52,100	96.13
Blank votes			939	1.74	1,497	2.76
Null votes			462	0.86	602	1.11
Turnout			53,903	67.41	54,206	67.78
Abstentions			26,062	32.59	25,766	32.22
Registered voters			79,965		79,972	
Result			H old			

=== 2022 ===
Legislative Election 2022: Calvados's 3rd constituency
Party	Candidate	Votes	%	±%
RN	Martine Vilmet	9,229	24.25	+7.09
HOR (Ensemble)	Jérémie Patrier-Leitus	8,531	22.42	-7.28
LR (UDC)	Nathalie Porte	8,311	21.84	+1.05
LFI (NUPÉS)	Didier Canu	8,160	21.44	−6.95
REC	Edouard Fauvage	1,355	3.56	N/A
Others	N/A	2,465	6.48	
Turnout		38,051	48.83	−1.84
2nd round result
HOR (Ensemble)	Jérémie Patrier-Leitus	18,546	53.50	+4.82
RN	Martine Vilmet	16,120	46.50	N/A
Turnout		34,666	47.61	+4.65
HOR gain from LR				

=== 2017 ===
Candidate	Label	First round		Second round	
Candidate	Label	Votes	%	Votes	%
Florence Lehéricy	MoDem	11,602	29.70	14,394	48.68
Sébastien Leclerc	LR	8,123	20.79	15,174	51.32
Christelle Lechevalier-Letard	FN	6,702	17.16		
Clotilde Valter	PS	6,251	16.00		
Didier Canu	FI	3,370	8.63		
Jacques Bessin	ECO	794	2.03		
Serge Loiseau	PCF	676	1.73		
Steven Mafiodo	DLF	621	1.59		
Michel Langevin	EXG	490	1.25		
Karine Seguin	DIV	269	0.69		
Angelo Lecoq	DVG	88	0.23		
Henri Nourry	DVG	62	0.16		
Wilfried Van Oost	DVG	17	0.04		
Votes		39,065	100.00	29,568	100.00
Valid votes		39,065	97.68	29,568	87.21
Blank votes		636	1.59	2,849	8.40
Null votes		292	0.73	1,487	4.39
Turnout		39,993	50.67	33,904	42.96
Abstentions		38,935	49.33	45,021	57.04
Registered voters		78,928		78,925	
Source: Ministry of the Interior

=== 2012 ===
Summary of the 10 June and 17 June 2012 French legislative election in Calvados’ 3rd Constituency
Candidate	Party		1st round		2nd round	
Candidate	Party		Votes	%	Votes	%
Clotilde Valter	Socialist Party	PS	17,354	38.52%	23,010	51.20%
Claude Leteurtre	New Centre-Presidential Majority	NCE	15,656	34.75%	21,934	48.80%
Sandrine Linares	Front National	FN	6,702	14.88%		
Serge Loiseau	Left Front	FG	2,039	4.53%		
Sabine Michaux	Europe Ecology – The Greens	EELV	1,539	3.42%		
Christine Annoot	Miscellaneous Right	DVD	1,063	2.36%		
Michel Langevin	Far Left	EXG	422	0.94%		
Christophe Mussle	Far Left	EXG	272	0.60%		
Total			45,047	100%	44,944	100%
Registered voters			78,477		78,453	
Blank/Void ballots			797	1.74%	1,415	3.05%
Turnout			45,844	58.42%	46,359	59.09%
Abstentions			32,633	41.58%	32,094	40.91%
Result					PS GAIN FROM NC	

=== 2007 ===
Summary of the 10 June and 17 June 2007 French legislative election in Calvados’ 3rd Constituency
Candidate	Party		1st round		2nd round	
Candidate	Party		Votes	%	Votes	%
Claude Leteurtre	New Centre-Presidential Majority	NCE	13,171	29.94%	22,633	52.84%
Clotilde Valter	Socialist Party	PS	12,411	28.21%	20,197	47.16%
Eric Lehericy	Miscellaneous Right	DVD	9,767	22.20%		
Marcelle Bazil	Front National	FN	1,456	3.31%		
Brigitte Jacob	Far Left	EXG	1,211	2.75%		
Flavie Pasquet	Hunting, Fishing, Nature, Traditions	CPNT	1,145	2.60%		
Laurence Morand	The Greens	VEC	1,092	2.48%		
Serge Loiseau	Communist	PCF	855	1.94%		
Paul Mercier	Movement for France	MPF	601	1.37%		
Thi Mai Tram Tran	Far Left	EXG	528	1.20%		
Marie-Claude Herboux	Far Left	EXG	517	1.18%		
Alain Angelini	Ecologist	ECO	450	1.02%		
Jacques Bessin	Independent	DIV	353	0.80%		
Yves Dupres	Far Right	EXD	261	0.59%		
Patrick Bunel	Miscellaneous Right	DVD	171	0.39%		
Total			43,989	100%	42,830	100%
Registered voters			74,344		74,344	
Blank/Void ballots			976	2.17%	1,416	3.20%
Turnout			44,965	60.48%	44,246	59.52%
Abstentions			29,379	39.52%	30,098	40.48%
Result					NC GAIN FROM UDF	

=== 2002 ===
Legislative Election 2002: Calvados's 3rd constituency
Party	Candidate	Votes	%	±%
PS	Clotilde Valter	11,368	25.95	
UDF	Claude Leteurtre	8,243	18.82	
DL	Eric Lehericy	6,761	15.44	
UMP	André Fanton	6,089	13.90	
FN	Marcelle Bazil	4,242	9.69	
CPNT	Jean-Michel Leboeuf	1,813	4.14	
PCF	Jacqueline Le Corre	911	2.08	
EXG	Marie-Claude Herboux	892	2.04	
Others	N/A	3,480		
Turnout		44,847	62.60	
2nd round result
UDF	Claude Leteurtre	23,627	56.21	
PS	Clotilde Valter	18,406	43.79	
Turnout		43,626	60.91	
UDF gain from PS				

=== 1997 ===
Legislative Election 1997: Calvados's 3rd constituency
Party	Candidate	Votes	%	±%
PS	Yvette Roudy	14,857	32.87	
RPR	André Fanton	12,709	28.12	
FN	Michelle Hamon	5,719	12.65	
PCF	Jacqueline Le Corre	3,345	7.40	
DVD	Jean-Philippe Jonquard	2,573	5.69	
MPF	Jérôme de Leusse	1,488	3.29	
LV	Eric Boisnard	1,452	3.21	
GE	Samuel Lemarechal	1,382	3.06	
MRC	Etienne Brasselet	1,114	2.46	
DVE	Alain Angelini	554	1.23	
Turnout		47,678	69.26	
2nd round result
PS	Yvette Roudy	26,790	55.26	
RPR	André Fanton	21,687	44.74	
Turnout		51,199	74.27	
PS gain from RPR				

== Sources ==
- Official results of French elections from 1998: "Résultats électoraux officiels en France" (in French).
