= The Europe Prize =

The Europe Prize was established in 1955 by the Parliamentary Assembly of the Council of Europe. It is awarded each year to one or more towns or municipalities that have made exceptional efforts to spread the ideal of European unity.

Winning cities demonstrate their commitment to European ideals through twinnings, European-themed events, exchanges and visits.

== The Europe Prize award system ==
Three other awards - the European Diploma, the Flag of Honour and the Plaque of Honour - form part of the Europe Prize system, allowing towns to progress through various levels before applying for the top award, the Europe Prize itself.

== Winning cities ==
Year	City	Country
1955	Coventry	United Kingdom
1956	Puteaux; Offenbach am Main	France; West Germany
1957	Bordeaux; Turin	France; Italy
1958	Vienna; The Hague	Austria; Netherlands
1959	Istanbul	Turkey
1960	Bruges; Aarhus	Belgium; Denmark
1961	Rhodes; Schwarzenbek	Greece; West Germany
1962	Palerme	Italy
1963	Aubenas	France
1964	Innsbruck	Austria
1965	Tübingen	West Germany
1966	Kristiansand	Norway
1967	Strasbourg	France
1968	Faenza	Italy
1969	Karlsruhe; Nancy	West Germany; France
1970	Sierre	Switzerland
1971	Udine	Italy
1972	Zelzate	Belgium
1973	Würzburg	West Germany
1974	Cesenatico; Mâcon	Italy; France
1975	Darmstadt	West Germany
1976	Devon	United Kingdom
1977	Avignon	France
1978	Tubize	Belgium
1979	Graz	Austria
1980	Passau	West Germany
1981	Braunfels	West Germany
1982	Braine-l'Alleud	Belgium
1983	Lausanne	Switzerland
1984	Royal Leamington Spa	United Kingdom
1985	Santiago de Compostela	Spain
1986	Klagenfurt; Arnhem	Austria; Netherlands
1987	Neukölln (Berlin)	West Germany
1988	Aalborg	Denmark
1989	Lucca	Italy
1990	Plouguerneau	France
1991	Bursa	Turkey
1992	Delfzijl	Netherlands
1993	Bocholt; Mülheim an der Ruhr	Germany
1994	Linz	Austria
1995	Bologna	Italy
1996	Wansbeck	United Kingdom
1997	Ratisbonne	Germany
1998	Częstochowa	Poland
1999	Speyer	Germany
2000	Cockermouth; Marvejols	United Kingdom; France
2001	Sankt Pölten	Austria
2002	Gdynia	Poland
2003	Klaipėda	Lithuania
2004	Oudenaarde	Belgium
2005	Kaliningrad	Russia
2006	Szeged	Hungary
2007	Nuremberg	Germany
2008	Katowice	Poland
2009	Ankara	Turkey
2010	Kharkiv	Ukraine
2011	Hünfeld; Landerneau	Germany; France
2012	Corciano; Sighișoara	Italy; Romania
2013	Altötting; Tata	Germany; Hungary
2014	Słupsk	Poland
2015	Dresden; Vara	Germany; Sweden
2016	Girona	Spain
2017	Lublin	Poland
2018	Ivano-Frankivsk	Ukraine
2019	Donostia/San Sebastián	Spain
2020	Amilly	France
2021	Khmelnytskyi	Ukraine
2022	İzmir	Turkey
2023	Bolesławiec	Poland
2024	Terrassa	Spain
2025	Gaziantep	Turkey
2026	Reggio Emilia	Italy
