= Annales de Paléontologie =

- Discipline: Earth Sciences
- Language: English

Publication details
- Publisher: Elsevier
- Impact factor: 0.702 (2020)

Standard abbreviations
- ISO 4: Ann. Paléontol.

Indexing
- ISSN: 0753-3969 (print); 1778-3666 (web)

Links
- Journal homepage

Annales de Paléontologie is a peer-reviewed scientific journal covering paleontology. It is published by Elsevier.

According to the Journal Citation Reports, its 2020 impact factor is 0.702. The journal is abstracted and indexed in BIOSIS Previews, PASCAL, FRANCIS, and Scopus.

As of May 2022, the editor-in-chief is Didier Neraudeau.
