= Jérémie Patrier-Leitus =

French politician (born 1989)

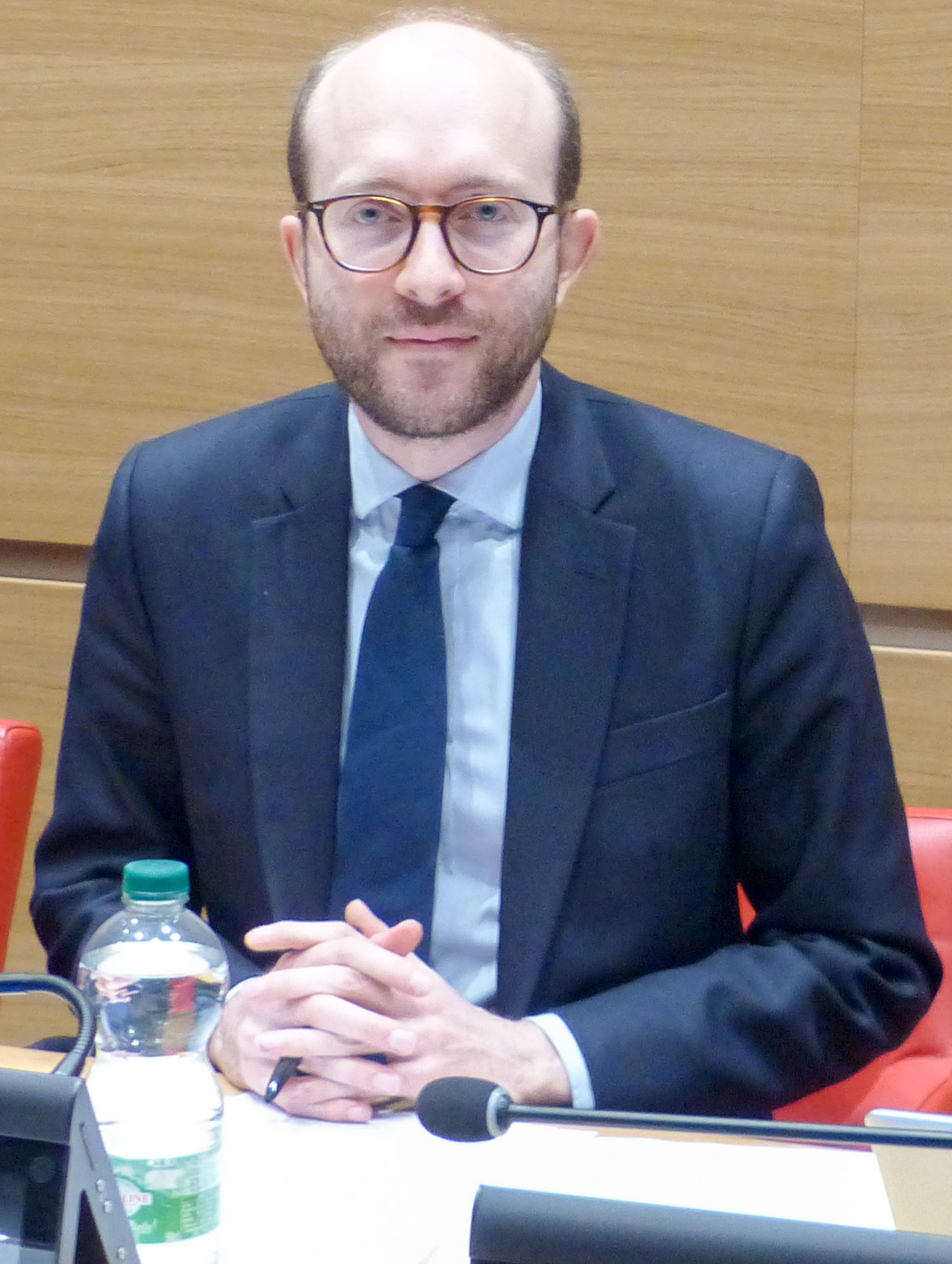

Member of the National Assembly for Calvados's 3rd constituency
- Incumbent
- Assumed office 22 June 2022
- Preceded by: Nathalie Porte

Personal details
- Born: 7 March 1989 (age 37) Paris, France
- Party: Horizons
- Education: Paris Dauphine University

Jérémie Patrier-Leitus (born 7 March 1989) is a French politician of Horizons who has been serving as a deputy in the National Assembly, representing Calvados's 3rd constituency.

== Early life and career ==
After two years working at the French Institute Alliance Française in New York City, Patrier-Leitus returned to Paris where he served as the organization’s point person. From 2017, he also began teaching courses in the management of cultural organizations at Sciences Po. From 2019 to 2022, he worked at the Ministry of Culture to coordinate efforts on the reconstruction of Notre-Dame de Paris, following the cathedral's 2019 fire.

== Political career ==
In parliament, Patrier-Leitus has since been serving on the Committee on Cultural Affairs and Education.

In addition to his committee assignments, Patrier-Leitus has been part of the French-Parliamentary Friendship Group with the United States and the French-Croatian Parliamentary Friendship Group.

== Other activities ==
- Radio France, Member of the Board of Directors (since 2022)
- Centre Pompidou, Member of the Board of Directors
