= Christophe Blanchet =

French politician (born 1973)

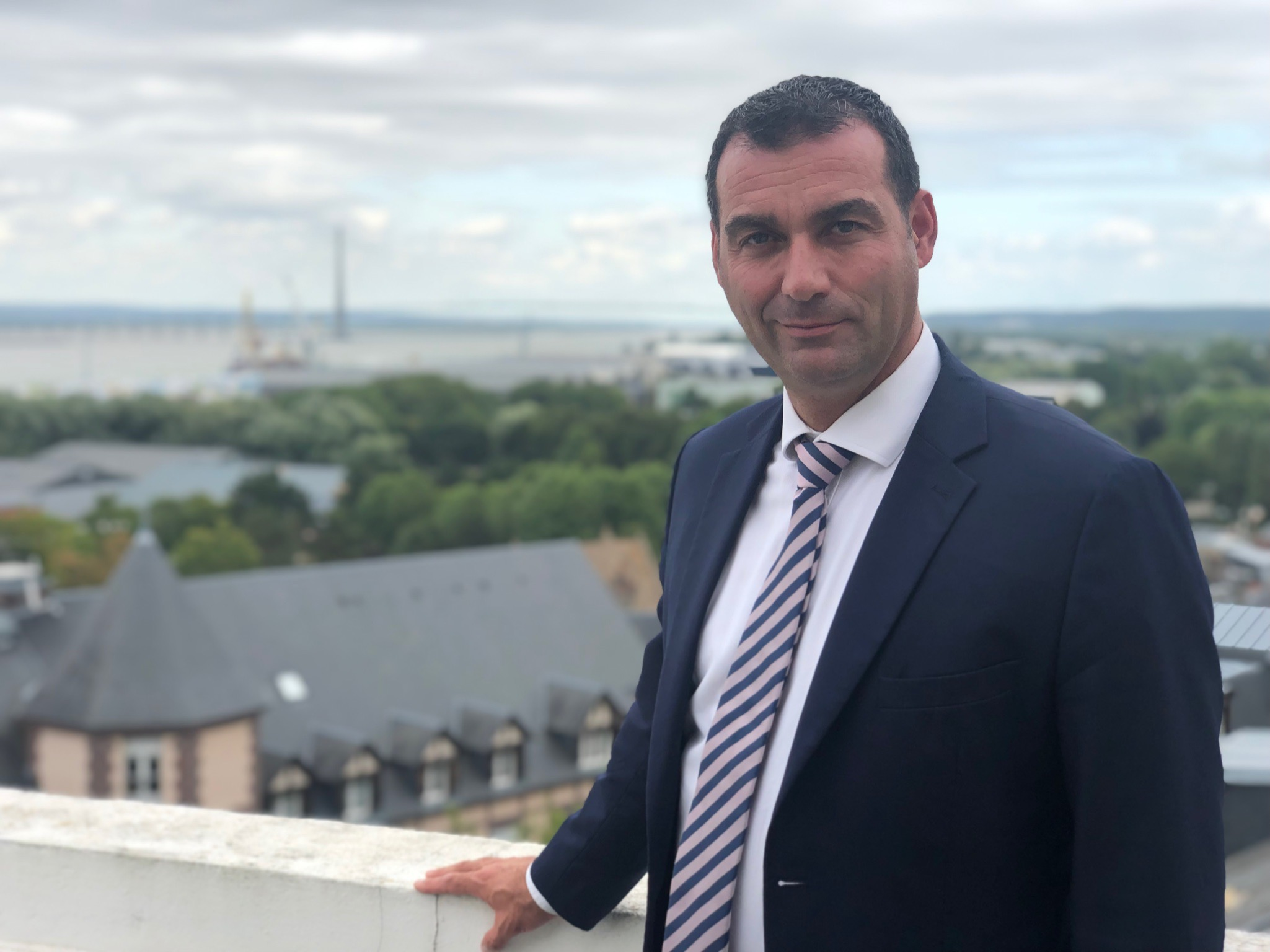

Member of the National Assembly for Calvados's 4th constituency
- Incumbent
- Assumed office 21 June 2017
- Preceded by: Nicole Ameline

Personal details
- Born: 9 April 1973 (age 53) Caen, France
- Party: MoDem; Renaissance
- Education: INSEEC Business School

Christophe Blanchet (born 9 April 1973) is a French politician of Renaissance (RE) who has been serving as a member of the French National Assembly, representing the 4th constituency of Calvados.

In Parliament, Blanchet serves on the Defense Committee. In addition to his committee assignments, he is a member of the French-Paraguayan Parliamentary Friendship Group.

In late 2019, Blanchet was one of 17 members of the Defense Committee who co-signed a letter to Prime Minister Édouard Philippe in which they warned that the 365 million euro ($406 million) sale of aerospace firm Groupe Latécoère to U.S. fund Searchlight Capital raised “questions about the preservation of know-how and France’s defense industry base” and urged government intervention.

In late 2020, Blanchet left the LREM group and instead joined the MoDem group.

== See also ==
- French legislative elections 2017
