= Arrondissements of the Calvados department =

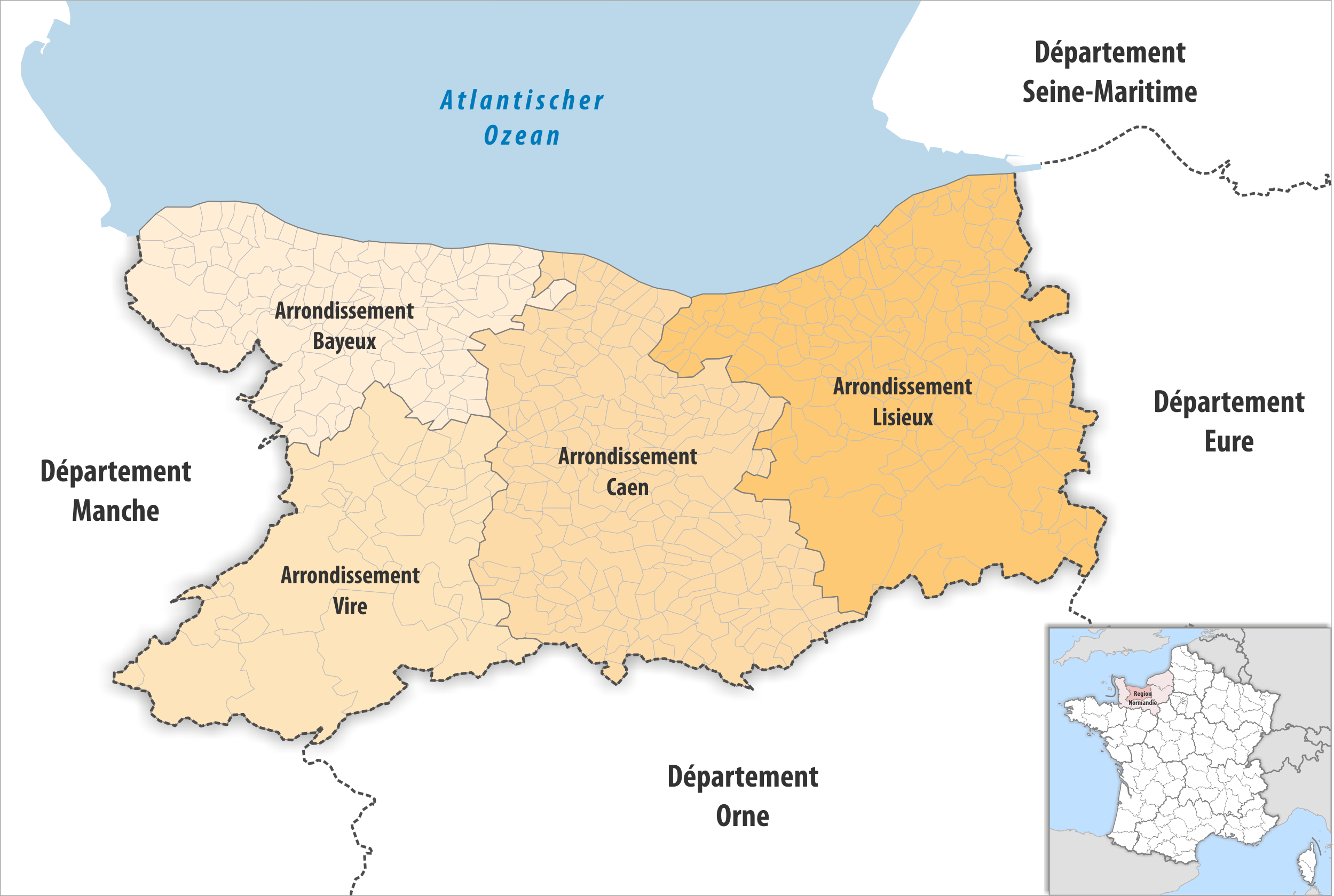
Map of arrondissements of the Calvados department.

The 4 arrondissements of the Calvados department are:

1. Arrondissement of Bayeux, (subprefecture: Bayeux) with 123 communes. The population of the arrondissement was 73,794 in 2021.
2. Arrondissement of Caen, (prefecture of the Calvados department: Caen) with 201 communes. The population of the arrondissement was 395,885 in 2021.
3. Arrondissement of Lisieux, (subprefecture: Lisieux) with 160 communes. The population of the arrondissement was 159,921 in 2021.
4. Arrondissement of Vire, (subprefecture: Vire-Normandie) with 44 communes. The population of the arrondissement was 71,033 in 2021.

== History ==
In 1800 the arrondissements of Caen, Bayeux, Falaise, Lisieux, Pont-l'Évêque and Vire were established. The arrondissements of Falaise and Pont-l'Évêque were disbanded in 1926.

The borders of the arrondissements of Calvados were modified in January 2017:

- four communes from the arrondissement of Bayeux to the arrondissement of Vire
- 19 communes from the arrondissement of Caen to the arrondissement of Bayeux
- 15 communes from the arrondissement of Caen to the arrondissement of Lisieux
- 20 communes from the arrondissement of Caen to the arrondissement of Vire
