= Isabelle Attard =

French archaeologist and politician (born 1969)

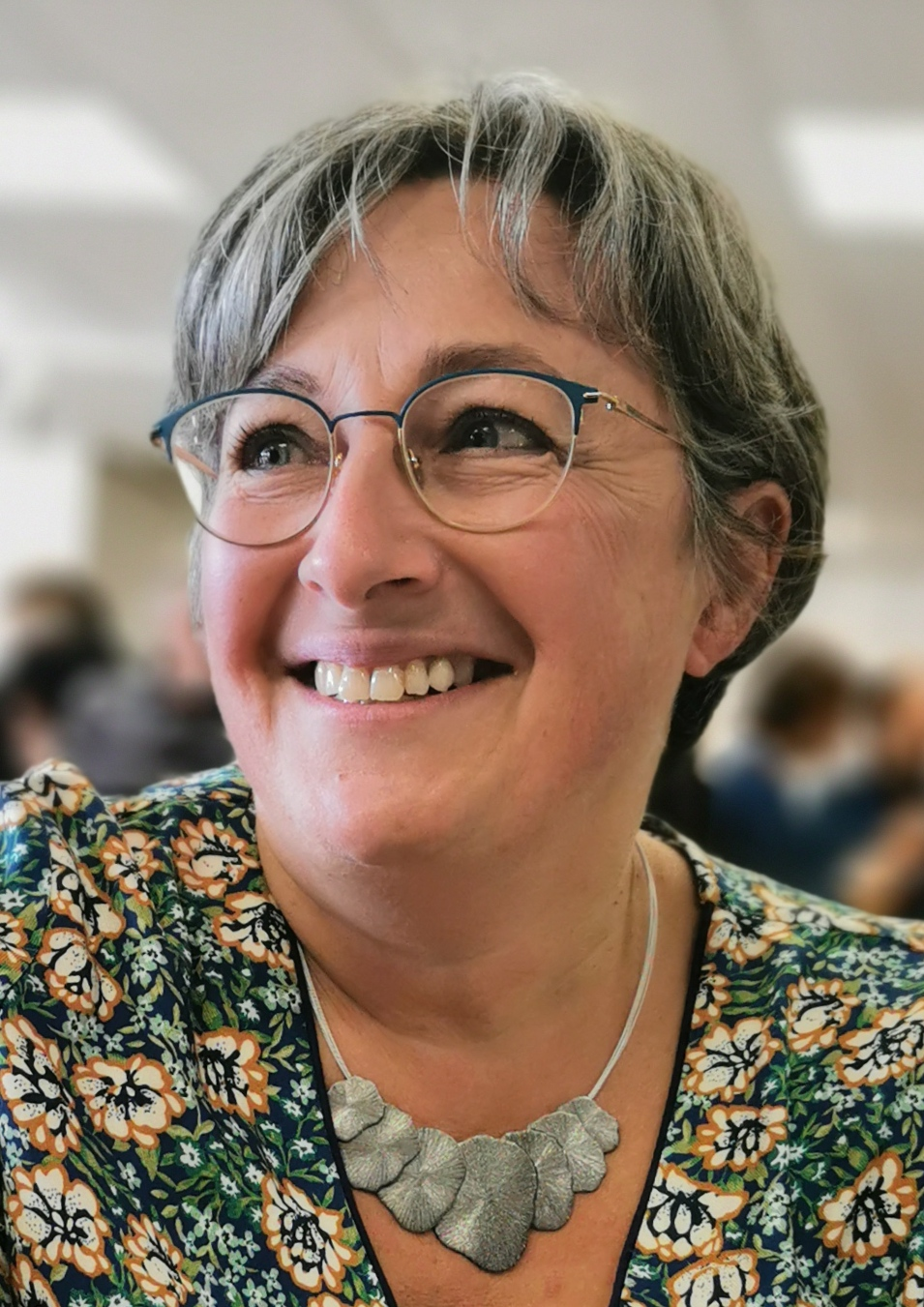
Image of Isabelle Attard

Isabelle Robert Attard (born 4 November 1969, in Vendôme) is a French archaeologist and politician, best known for her work in archaeozoology, specialising in the Bearded vulture during the Last Glacial Period. She has served as the museum director for the Bayeux Tapestry Museum from 2005 to 2010, and then the Utah Beach D-Day Museum from 2010 to 2012. As a politician, she has served as deputy for Calvados's 5th constituency, and was a member of the Europe Ecology – The Greens party until 2013, after which she was co-president of the New Deal party until 2015. Since 2015, she self-identifies as an anarchist.

== Biography ==
After a first-year DEUG in economics at the Montesquieu University, Isabelle Attard turned to history and obtained a DEUG in history at the University of Orléans. She then worked as a freelancer for the newspaper La République du Centre. Around this time, in 1990, she married and moved to Gothenburg, Sweden, where she worked in a McDonald's restaurant.

In 2002, she went to South Africa as a researcher at the Duinefontein site while preparing her thesis (from 2000 to 2004). After passing the heritage conservation officer exam in 2004, she was appointed director of the Bayeux Tapestry Museum in 2005, a position she held until her resignation in 2010.

In 2010, she obtained a PhD in environmental archaeology and archaeozoology.

In 2014, she received the 2014 E-Toile d'Or award in the “politics” category for her legislative work in support of Free software.

== Selected works ==
=== Books ===
- Comment je suis devenue anarchiste. Paris: Éditions du Seuil. 2019. ISBN 978-2-0214-4035-5.

=== Papers ===
- Vigne, Jean-Denis; Attard, Isabelle (2002). "The Bearded Vulture (Gypaetus barbatus) as an Accumulator of Archaeological Bones : Late Glacial Assemblages and Present-day Reference Data in Corsica (Western Mediterranean)". Journal of Archaeological Science. 29 (7): 763–777. Bibcode:2002JArSc..29..763R. doi:10.1006/jasc.2001.0778.
- Costamagno, Sandrine; Attard, Isabelle; Laroulandie, Véronique; Mourre, Vincent; Thiébaut, Céline (1994). "Rôle du gypaète barbu (Gypaetus barbatus) dans la constitution de l'assemblage osseux de la grotte du Noisetier (Fréchet-Aure, Hautes-Pyrénées, France)" [Role of the bearded vulture (Gypaetus barbatus) in the constitution of the bone assembly of the Grotte du Noisetier (Fréchet-Aure, Hautes-Pyrénées, France)]. Annales de Paléontologie (in French). 4 (94): 245–265.
