= Cantons of the Calvados department =

The following is a list of the 25 cantons of the Calvados department, in France, following the French canton reorganisation which came into effect in March 2015:

- Bayeux
- Cabourg
- Caen-1
- Caen-2
- Caen-3
- Caen-4
- Caen-5
- Condé-en-Normandie
- Courseulles-sur-Mer
- Évrecy
- Falaise
- Hérouville-Saint-Clair
- Le Hom
- Honfleur-Deauville
- Ifs
- Lisieux
- Livarot-Pays-d'Auge
- Mézidon Vallée d'Auge
- Les Monts d'Aunay
- Ouistreham
- Pont-l'Évêque
- Thue et Mue
- Trévières
- Troarn
- Vire Normandie
