= Calvados (department) =

Department of France

- Department
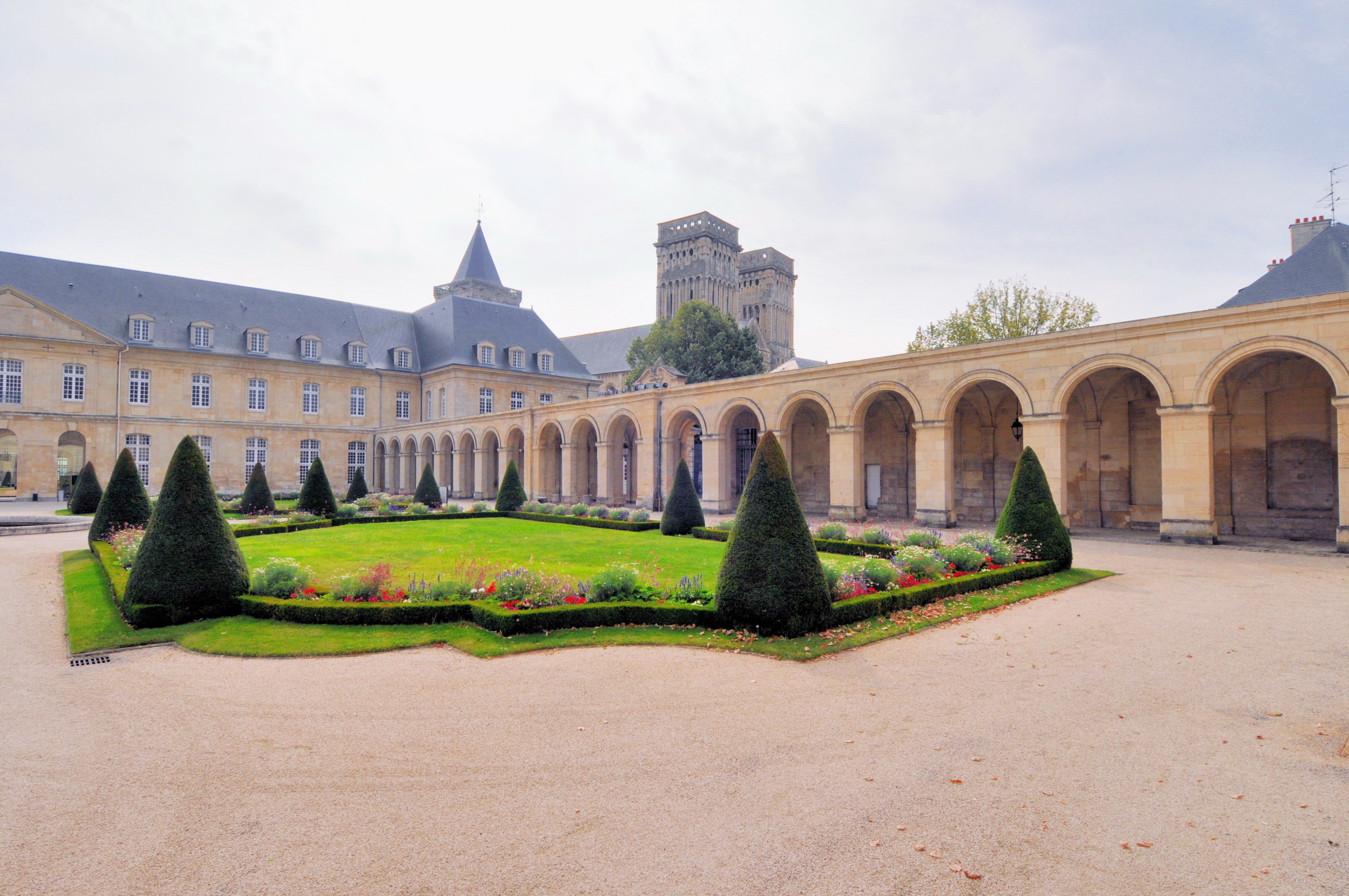
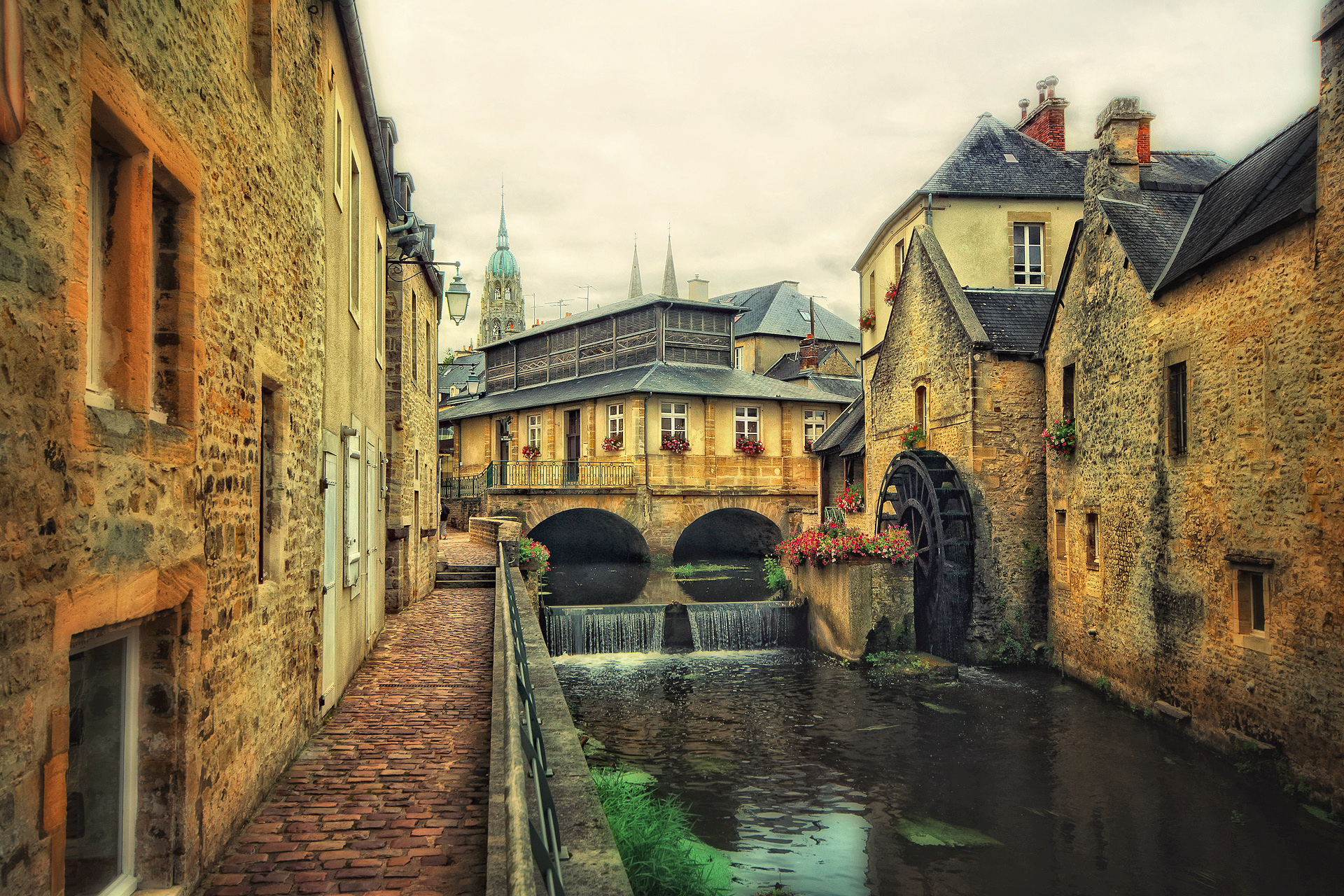
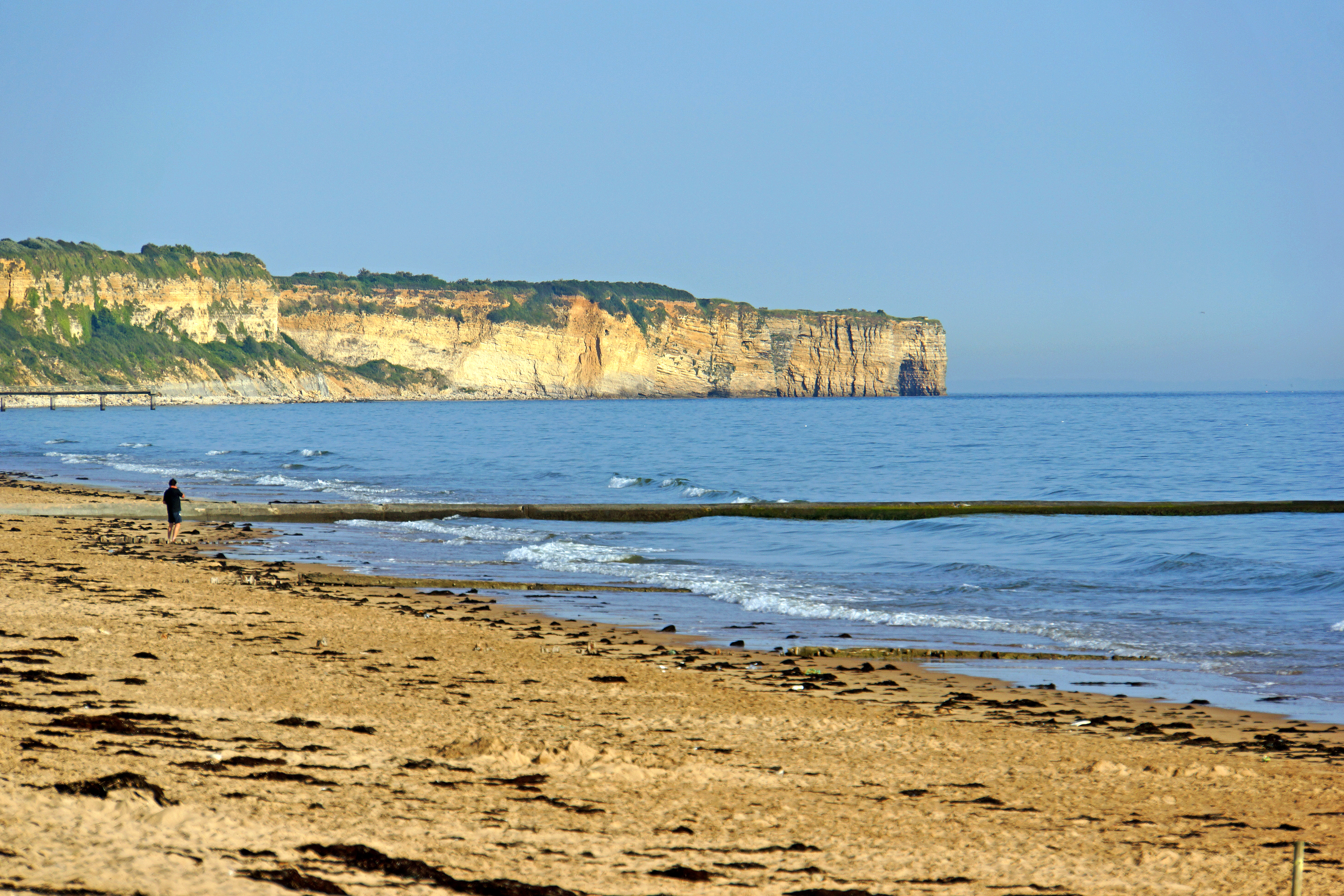
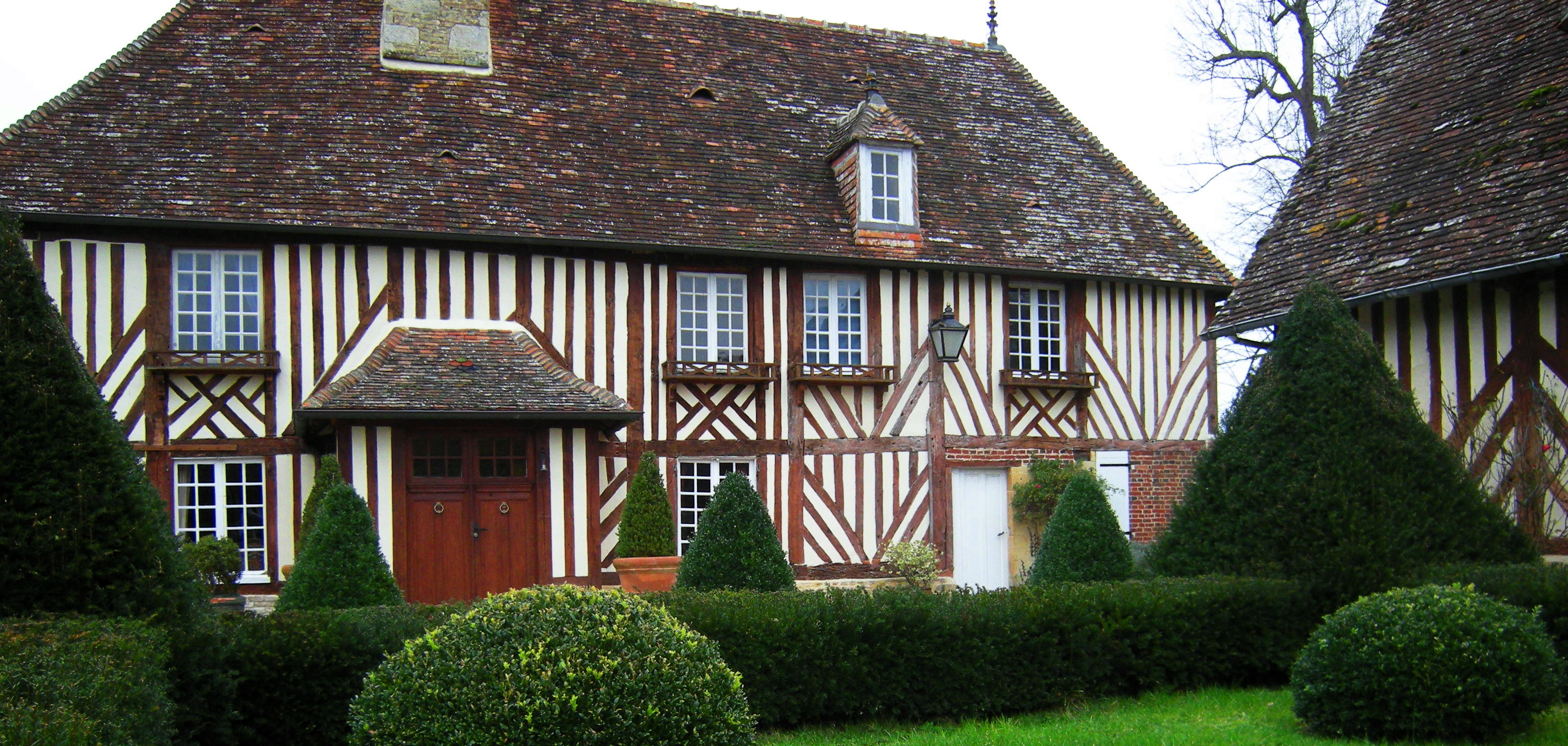
- From top down, left to right: Abbaye aux Dames in Caen, Bayeux's historic centre, Omaha Beach and timber framing house in Boissey

- Flag Coat of arms

- Location of Calvados in France
- Coordinates: 49°02′N 0°15′E
- Country: France
- Region: Normandy
- Prefecture: Caen
- Subprefectures: Bayeux; Lisieux; Vire-Normandie

Government
  - President of the Departmental Council: Jean-Léonce Dupont (The Centrists)

Area^{1}
  - Total: 5,535 km^{2} (2,137 sq mi)

Population (2023)
  - Total: 709,441
  - Rank: 34th
  - Density: 128.2/km^{2} (332.0/sq mi)
- Time zone: UTC+1 (CET)
  - Summer (DST): UTC+2 (CEST)
- ISO 3166 code: FR-14
- Department number: 14
- Arrondissements: 4
- Cantons: 25
- Communes: 526
- ^1 French Land Register data, which exclude estuaries, and lakes, ponds, and glaciers larger than 1 km^{2}

Calvados (UK: /ˈkælvədɒs/, US: /-doʊs, ˌkælvəˈdoʊs, ˌkɑːlvəˈ-/; French: [kalvados]) is a department in the Normandy region in northwestern France. It takes its name from a cluster of rocks off the Normandy coast. In 2023, it had a population of 709,441.

== History ==
Calvados is one of the original 83 departments created during the French Revolution on 4 March 1790, in application of the law of 22 December 1789. It had been part of the former province of Normandy. The name "Orne-Inférieure" was originally proposed, but it was ultimately called Calvados after a group of rocks off its coast.

One popular legend ascribes its etymology to the Salvador, a ship from the Spanish Armada that sank by the rocks near Arromanches-les-Bains in 1588. It is more likely, however, that the name Calvados was derived from calva dorsa, Latin meaning bare backs, in reference to two sparsely vegetated rocks off its shore.

After the allied victory at Waterloo the department was occupied by Prussian troops between June 1815 and November 1818.

On 6 June 1944, the Allied forces landed on the beaches of the Bay of the Seine in what became known as the Battle of Normandy.

== Geography ==
Calvados belongs to the region of Normandy and borders the departments of Seine-Maritime (across the Seine estuary), Eure, Orne and Manche. To the north is the Baie de la Seine, part of the English Channel (La Manche). Calvados includes the Bessin area, the Pays d'Auge and the northern half of an upland, "(La) Suisse normande" ("Norman Switzerland").

The city of Caen is at its heart which has no major towns nearby. The five major towns in Calvados are distant hubs from Caen, stemming from medieval main market town function: clockwise from the northeast:

- Deauville (on the coast)
- Lisieux
- Falaise, Calvados
- Vire-Normandie
- Bayeux

Smaller towns include those that emerged from villages in the Victorian period along the coasts, either for fishing and boating or for pioneering casinos, holiday amusements and sandy beach bathing.

== Economy ==
Agriculture is key to the private sector in Calvados and several parts rely heavily for prosperity on tourism, as well as regional distribution sites, transport work and general chemical and mechanical production industries; the university and research and development functions of the district are clustered around Caen. Bayeux is the main host location of the Bayeux tapestry. Caen Cathedral is a large instance of largely intact original medieval architecture, of Caen stone – the widely cited benchmark for construction limestone, sometimes used generally for any such product of strong, near flawless, pale or yellow quality. It neighbours Abbey of Sainte-Trinité, Caen, also known as Abbaye aux Dames. Calvados produces much butter, cheese, cider, and Calvados, the apple spirit, a brandy that alongside cheese has a major export market.

== Politics ==
The President of the Departmental Council is the centrist Jean-Léonce Dupont, the former dominant figure of the right and centre in the department. The Conseil General of Calvados and Devon County Council signed a Twinning Charter in 1971 to develop links with the English county of Devon.

Party		seats
	Socialist Party	18
•	Miscellaneous Right	18
•	The Republicans	6
	Left Radical Party	3
•	New Centre	3
•	MoDem	1

=== Presidential elections 2nd round ===
Election	Winning candidate	Party	%	2nd place candidate	Party	%
2022	Emmanuel Macron	LREM	60.29	Marine Le Pen	FN	39.71
2017	Emmanuel Macron	LREM	67.11	Marine Le Pen	FN	32.89
2012	François Hollande	PS	53.12	Nicolas Sarkozy	UMP	46.88
2007	Nicolas Sarkozy	UMP	51.20	Ségolène Royal	PS	48.80
2002	Jacques Chirac	RPR	83.95	Jean-Marie Le Pen	FN	16.05

=== Current National Assembly Representatives ===
Constituency	Member	Party
Calvados's 1st constituency	Joël Bruneau	DVD
Calvados's 2nd constituency	Arthur Delaporte	Socialist Party
Calvados's 3rd constituency	Jérémie Patrier-Leitus	Horizons
Calvados's 4th constituency	Christophe Blanchet	MoDem
Calvados's 5th constituency	Bertrand Bouyx	Horizons
Calvados's 6th constituency	Élisabeth Borne	Renaissance

== Demography ==
Historical population

Year	Pop.	±% p.a.
1791	391,352	—
1801	451,836	+1.45%
1806	505,210	+2.26%
1821	492,613	−0.17%
1831	494,702	+0.04%
1841	496,198	+0.03%
1851	491,210	−0.10%
1861	480,992	−0.21%
1872	454,012	−0.52%
1881	439,830	−0.35%
1891	428,945	−0.25%
1901	410,178	−0.45%
1911	396,318	−0.34%
1921	384,730	−0.30%

Year	Pop.	±% p.a.
1931	401,356	+0.42%
1936	404,901	+0.18%
1946	400,026	−0.12%
1954	442,991	+1.28%
1962	480,757	+1.03%
1968	518,950	+1.28%
1975	560,354	+1.10%
1982	589,025	+0.72%
1990	617,991	+0.60%
1999	647,873	+0.53%
2007	673,144	+0.48%
2012	687,304	+0.42%
2017	694,002	+0.19%
2023	709,441	+0.37%

The inhabitants of Calvados are called "Calvadosiens" (male) and "Calvadosiennes" (female).

Age distribution in Calvados (2019):

- 75 years and older: 10.0%
- 60–74 years old: 18.1%
- 45–59 years old: 19.4%
- 30–44 years old: 17.4%
- 15–29 years old: 18.0%
- 0–14 years old: 17.1%

=== Principal towns ===
The most populous commune is Caen, the prefecture. As of 2023, there are 7 communes with more than 10,000 inhabitants:

Commune	Population (2023)
Caen	109,400
Hérouville-Saint-Clair	23,470
Lisieux	19,645
Vire Normandie	17,457
Bayeux	12,659
Ifs	11,937
Mondeville	10,331

== Culture ==
The Bayeux Tapestry is on display in Bayeux and makes the city one of the most-visited tourist destinations in Normandy.

Juno Beach Centre at Courseulles-sur-Mer, Calvados, commemorates the D-Day landing of the Canadian liberation forces at Juno Beach during World War II in 1944. The cult of Saint Thérèse de Lisieux brings large numbers of people on pilgrimage to Lisieux, where she lived in a Carmelite convent. Every September, Deauville hosts the Festival of the American Movie and the beach resort of Cabourg hosts the Festival of the Romantic Movie. Annually, the city of Caen celebrates the festival of the electronical cultures called "Nordik Impakt" and the festival of Beauregard, just around Caen.

The local dialect of the Norman language is known as Augeron. It is spoken by a minority of the population.

== Tourism ==
Calvados is a popular tourism destination in France because of its seaside resorts and their hotels and casinos. Other popular attractions in Calvados include several manors and castles, the chalk cliffs, the typical Norman houses, the history of William the Conqueror, Caen, Bayeux, Lisieux, the famous D-day beaches and numerous museums about the Second World War. Culinary specialties of Calvados are abundant: cider, Calvados, camembert, and Pont-l'Évêque cheeses.

One of the advantage of Calvados is to be fairly near large urban centers (Paris, Île-de-France). Calvados is therefore often preferred for holidays and for weekends and sometimes considered as the countryside of Paris.

Calvados, via the port of Ouistreham, is an entrance to the continent from Britain. There are two airports: Caen-Carpiquet and Deauville-Saint Gatien. The department of Calvados has several popular tourist areas: the Bessin, the Plain of Caen, the Bocage Virois, the Côte de Nacre, the Côte Fleurie and the Pays d'Auge. Several beaches of Calvados are popular for water sports, including Cabourg and Merville-Franceville-Plage.

Tourist capacity (2022):

- 10,200 hotel rooms
- 14,410 camping sites
- 12,795 other beds (tourist resorts, holiday villages, rural gites, youth hostels)

=== Second homes ===
As of 2019, 17.9% of available housing in the department were second homes.

Municipalities with more than 20% of second homes

Communes with population over 2,000 and more than 20% of second homes in 2019
Town	Municipal population	Percentage of second homes
Villers-sur-Mer	2,543	83.0%
Cabourg	3,558	79.7%
Deauville	3,565	71.9%
Trouville-sur-Mer	4,603	67.4%
Merville-Franceville-Plage	2,186	57.9%
Courseulles-sur-Mer	4,196	52.2%
Bernières-sur-Mer	2,274	44.3%
Dives-sur-Mer	5,276	39.9%
Saint-Aubin-sur-Mer	2,237	39.5%
Hermanville-sur-Mer	3,110	31.7%
Luc-sur-Mer	3,213	30.1%
Lion-sur-Mer	2,536	29.8%
Honfleur	6,733	27.9%
Ouistreham	9,344	25.8%
Touques	3,731	25.0%

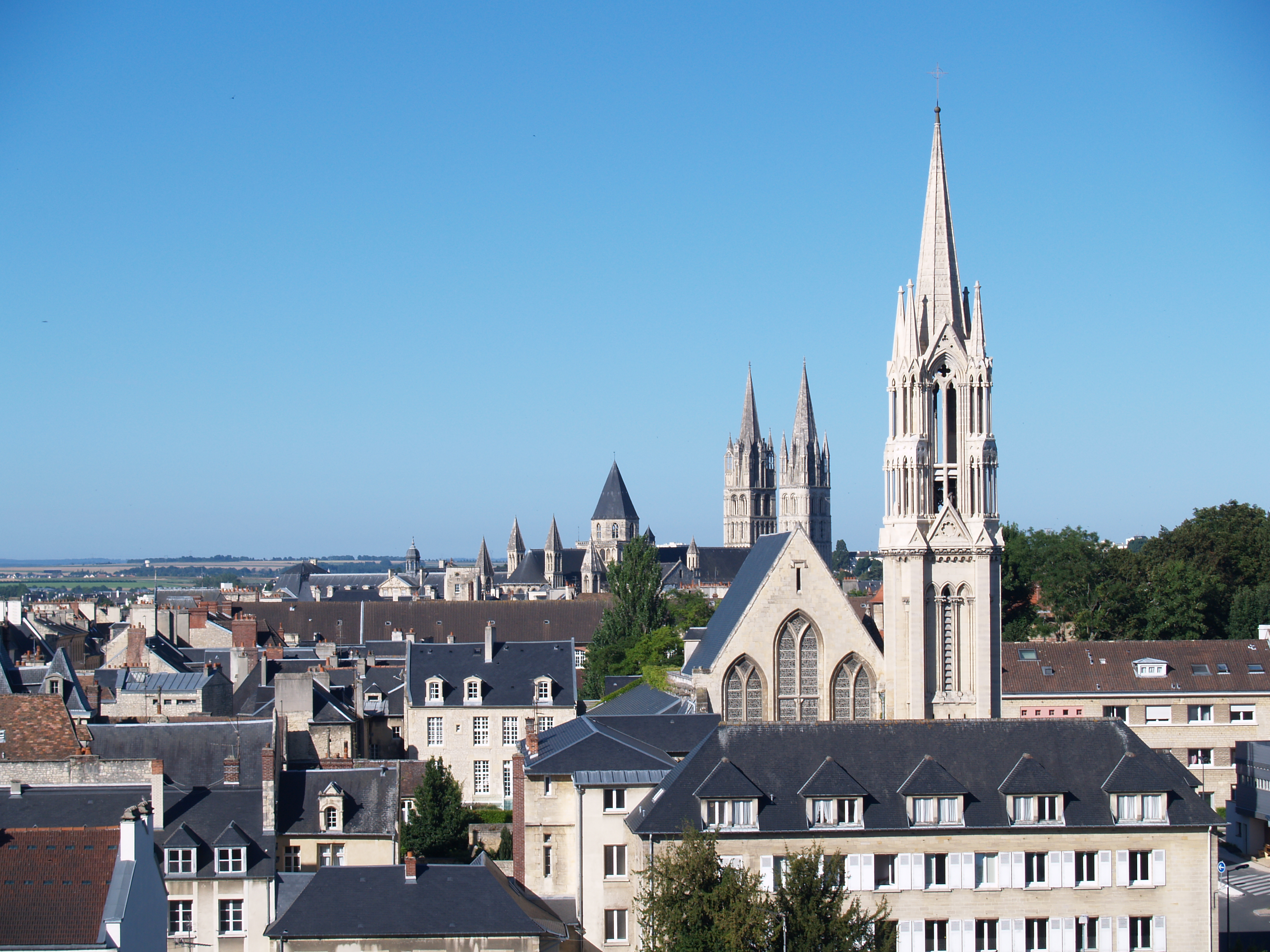
Caen

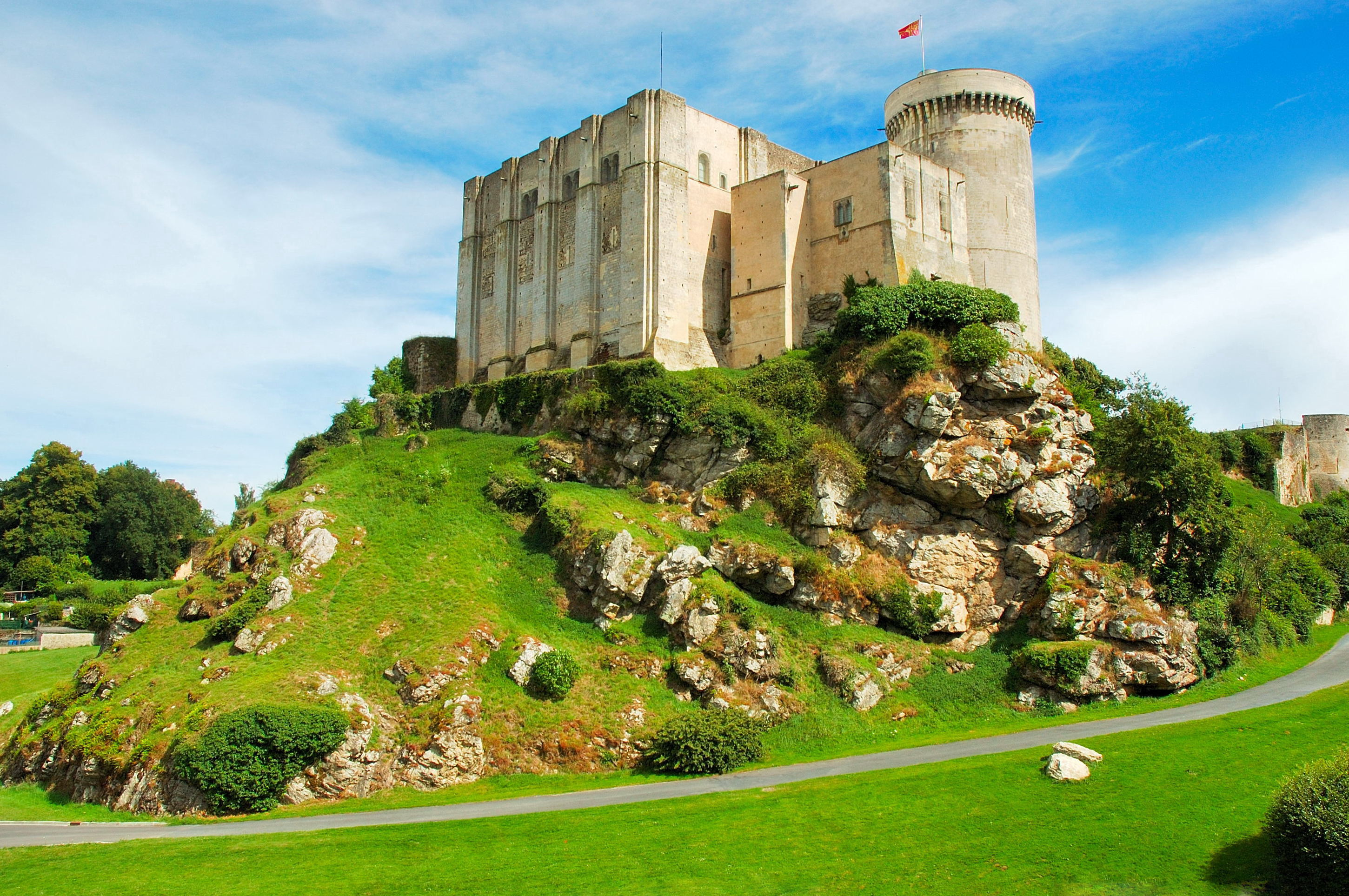
Château de Falaise

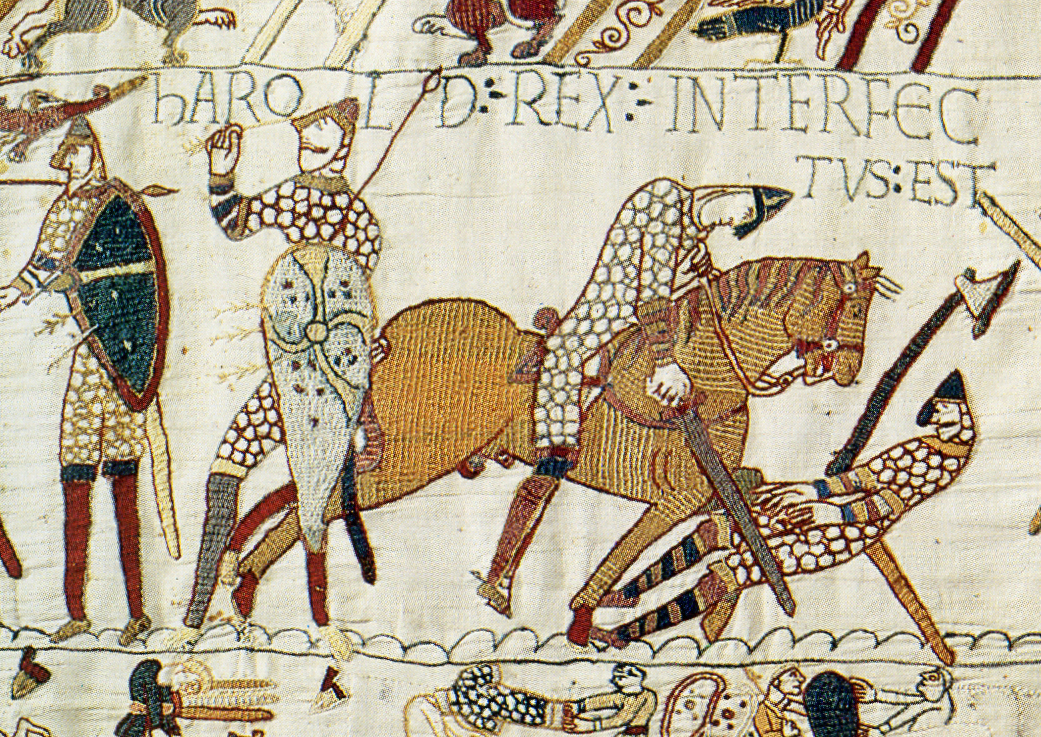
A fragment of the Bayeux Tapestry

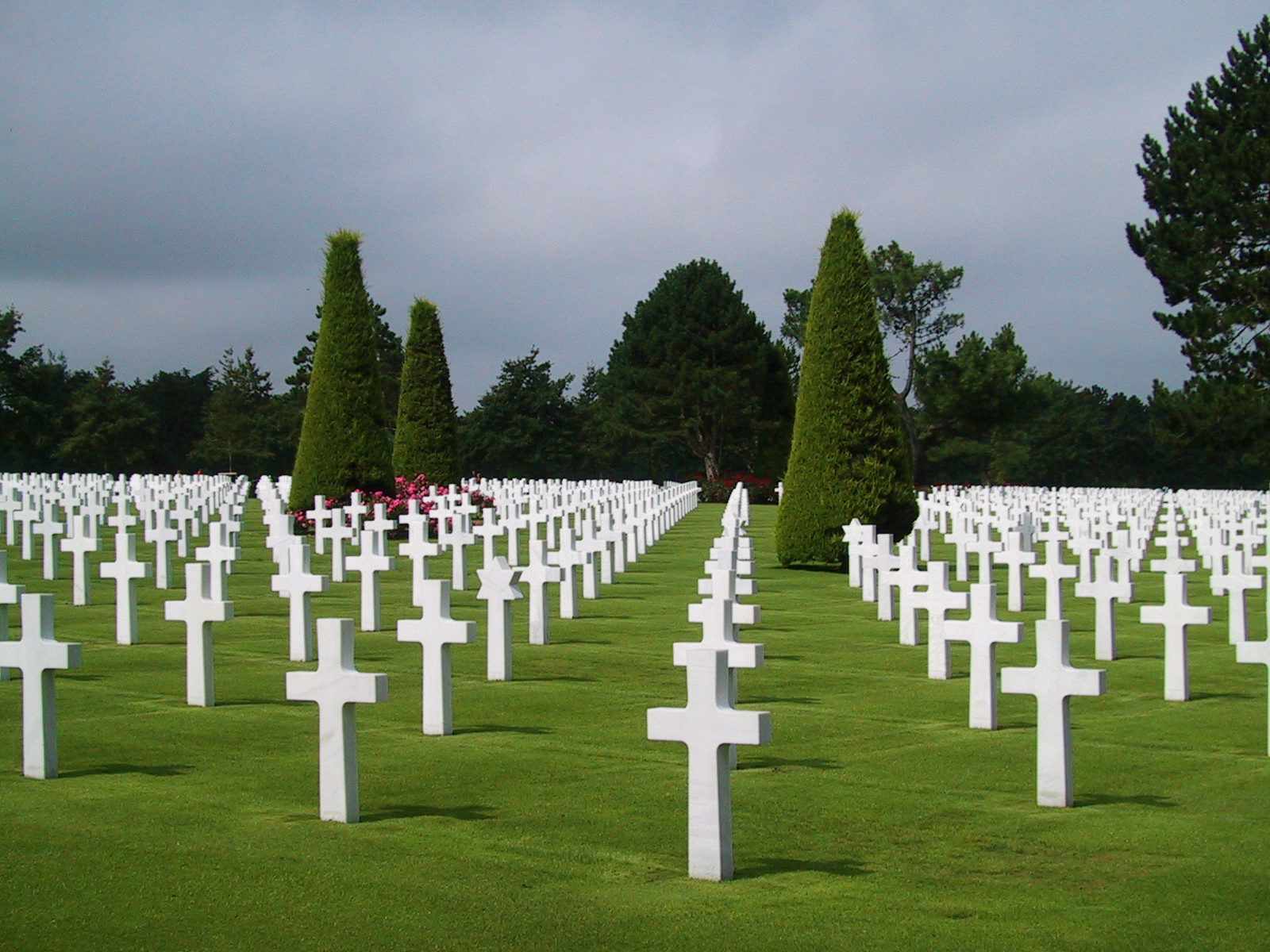
Normandy American Cemetery and Memorial

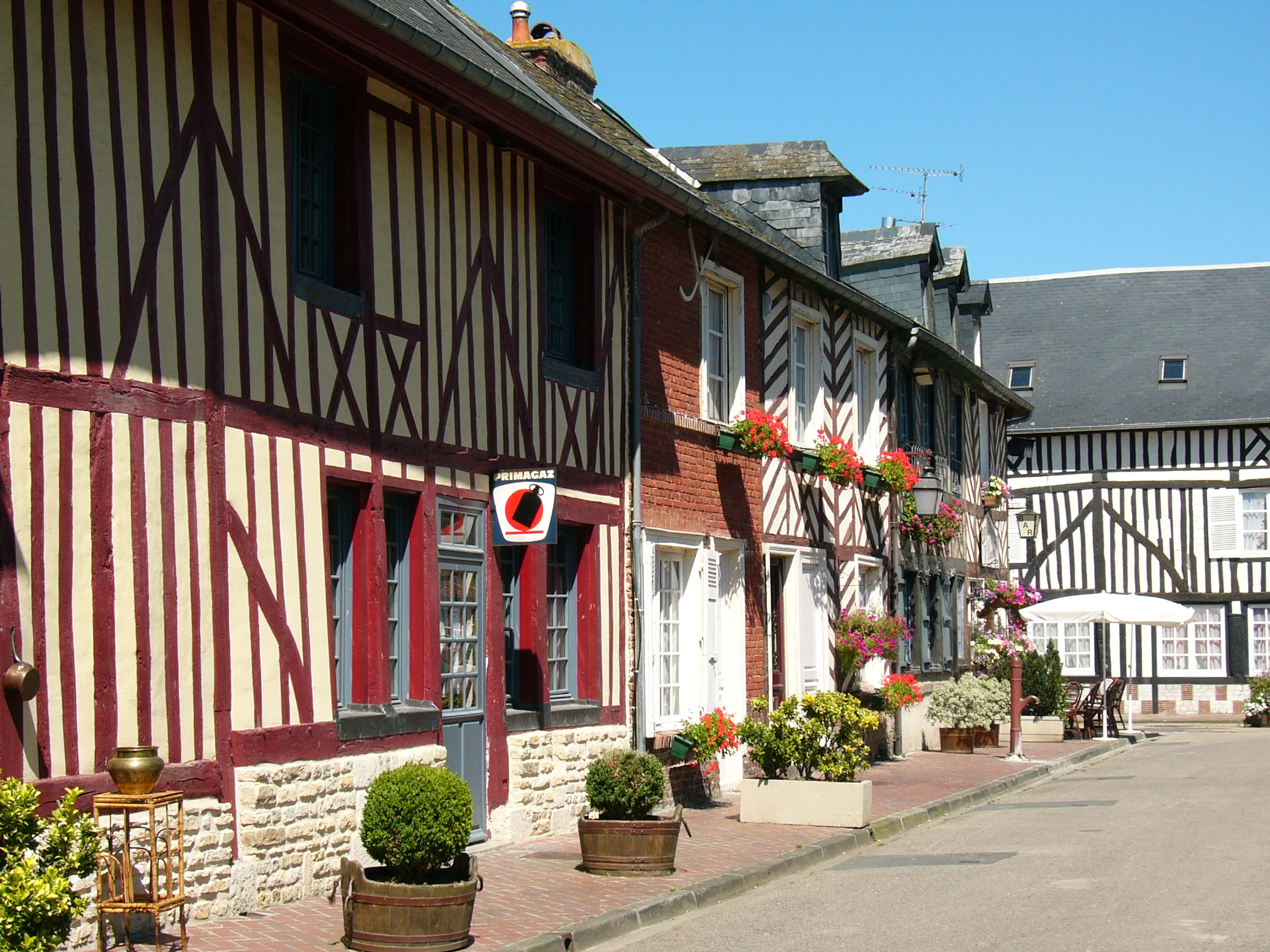
Half-timber houses in Beuvron-en-Auge, one of the Most Beautiful Villages of France

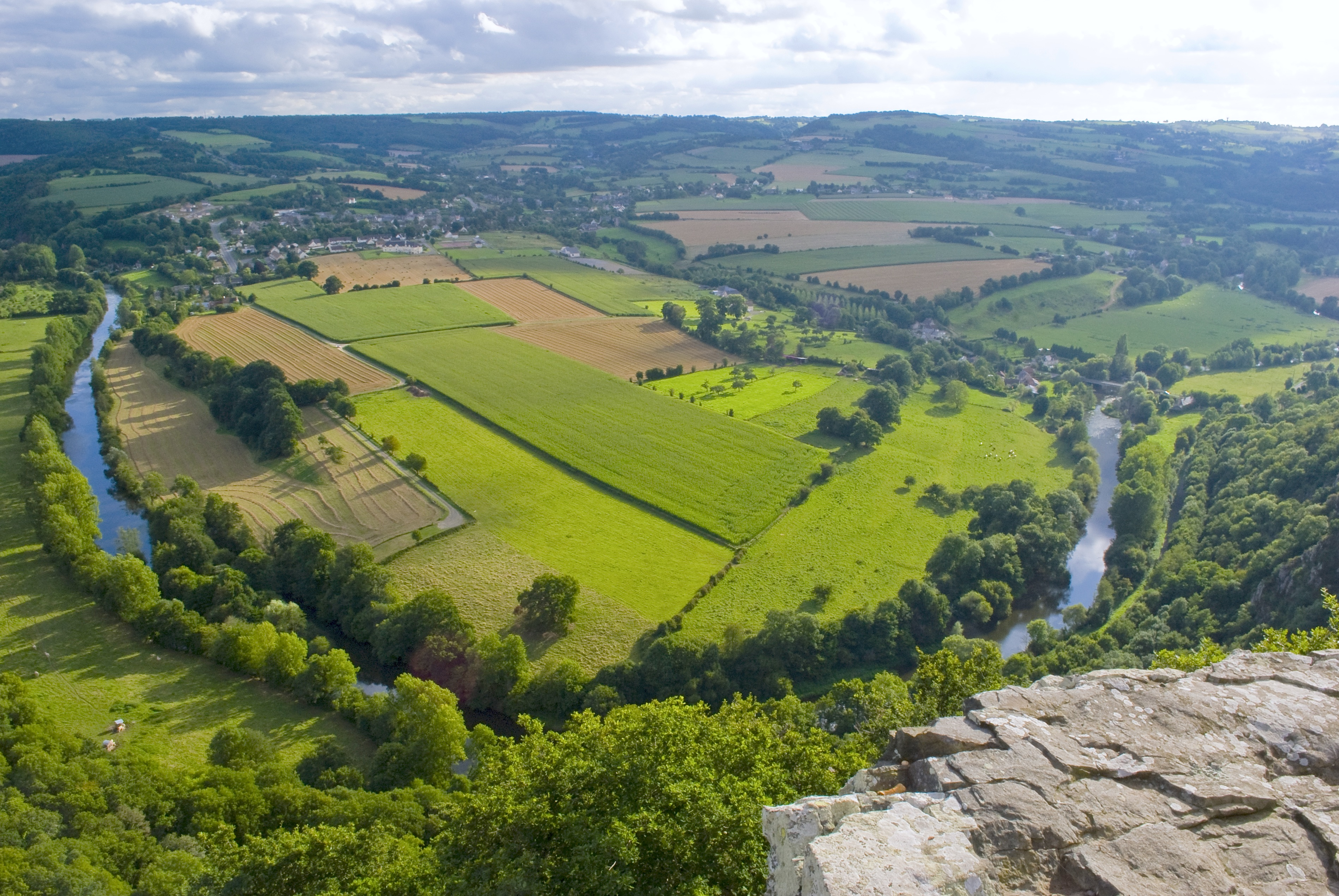
Suisse Normande

== Sport ==
Aquatic sports are often played on the coasts and beaches, for example, kite surfing and beach volleyball. Stade Malherbe Caen is a professional football team from Caen, who currently play in Ligue 2.

== See also ==
- Arrondissements of the Calvados department
- Cantons of the Calvados department
- Communes of the Calvados department
