= Souleuvre =

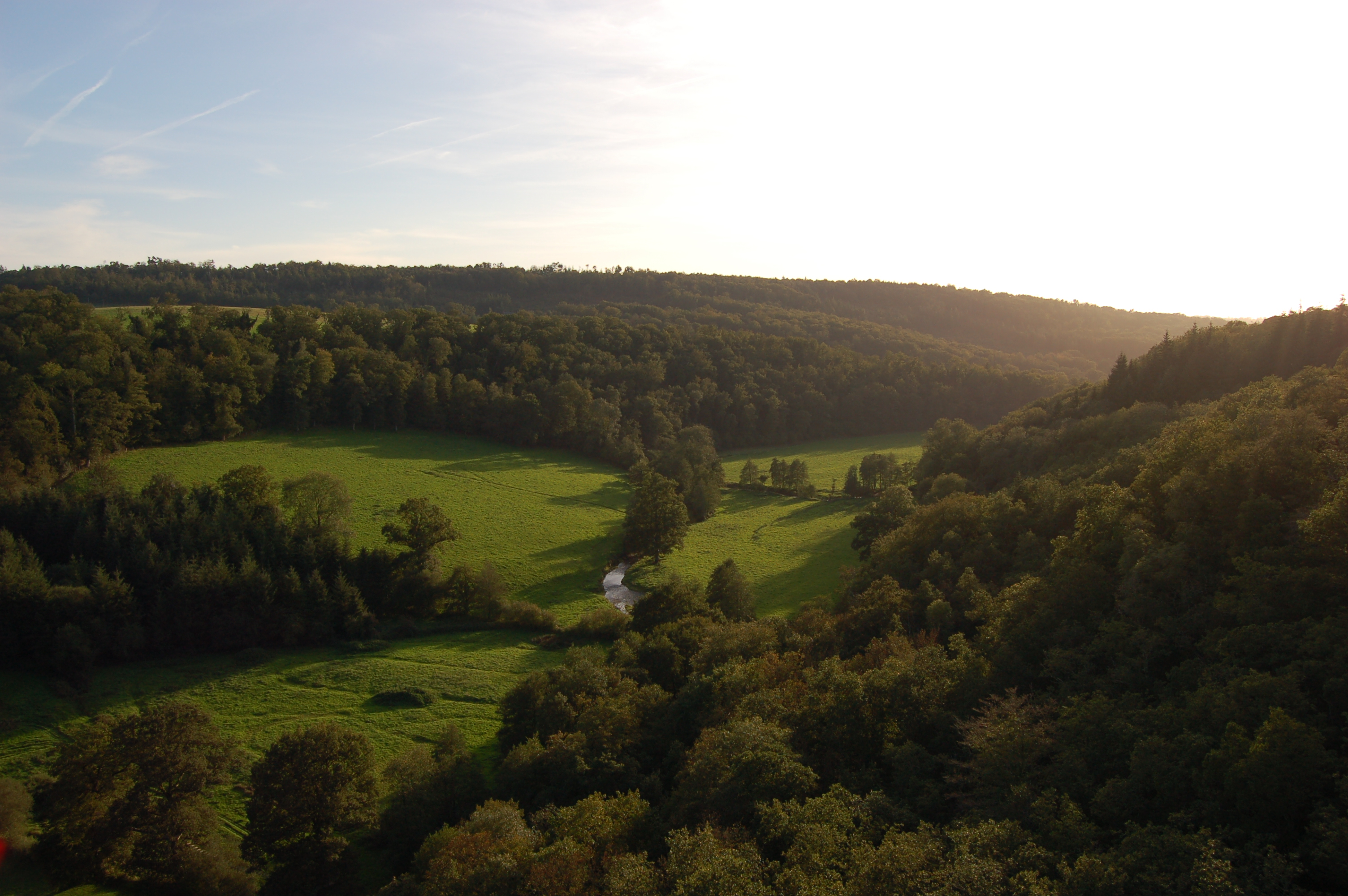
- Souleuvre valley

- Location within France Location within Normandy

Physical characteristics
- Source
  - location: la Lamerie, Montchamp
  - coordinates: 48.9281°N 0.7189°W
  - elevation: 190 m (620 ft)
- Mouth: Vire
  - location: Campeaux, Carville
  - coordinates: 48.9491°N 0.8934°W
  - elevation: 74 m (243 ft)
- Length: 19.0 km (11.8 mi)
- Basin size: 120 km^{2} (46 sq mi)
- Discharge
  - average: 1.57 m^{3}/s (55 cu ft/s) (Carville)

Basin features
- Progression: Vire→ English Channel
- Source: Géoportail, Sandre

The Souleuvre (French pronunciation: [sulœvʁ]) is a 19.0 km long right affluent of the Vire in Normandy, northwestern France.

== Geography ==
It crops at Montchamp near the hamlets of Lamerie, la Druerie and la Saffrie, 9 km to the east of Le Bény-Bocage and arrives at Le Tourneur where, having been rejoined by several affluents, it runs along the bed of a steep westwards pictorial valley, formed from the cambrian syncline of la zone bocaine. It lies in the bocage virois.

It joins the Vire, at the northern limit of Carville and Sainte-Marie-Laumont. It then runs westwards through les gorges de la Vire.

== Watershed ==
Its basin lies between those of la Drôme (north), l'Orne (west) and l'Allière (south). Its confluence with the Vire lies west of the basin.

It has 3 main affluents on its right bank: the Blandouit (6,3 km), joined by the Rubec (5.9 km) at Saint-Pierre-Tarentaine the Courbençon (9,5 km) at Le Tourneur the Roucamps (14,4 km) between Le Tourneur and La Ferrière-Harang.

The Souleuvre and the Vire along with the Rubec and the Blandouit form a digging axe in the bocain syncline shaping a pictural valley ending in les gorges de la Vire.

== Communes ==
Montchamp, Saint-Charles-de-Percy, Montchauvet, Le Bény-Bocage, Saint-Pierre-Tarentaine, Le Tourneur, Carville, La Ferrière-Harang, Campeaux

== Souleuvre valley ==
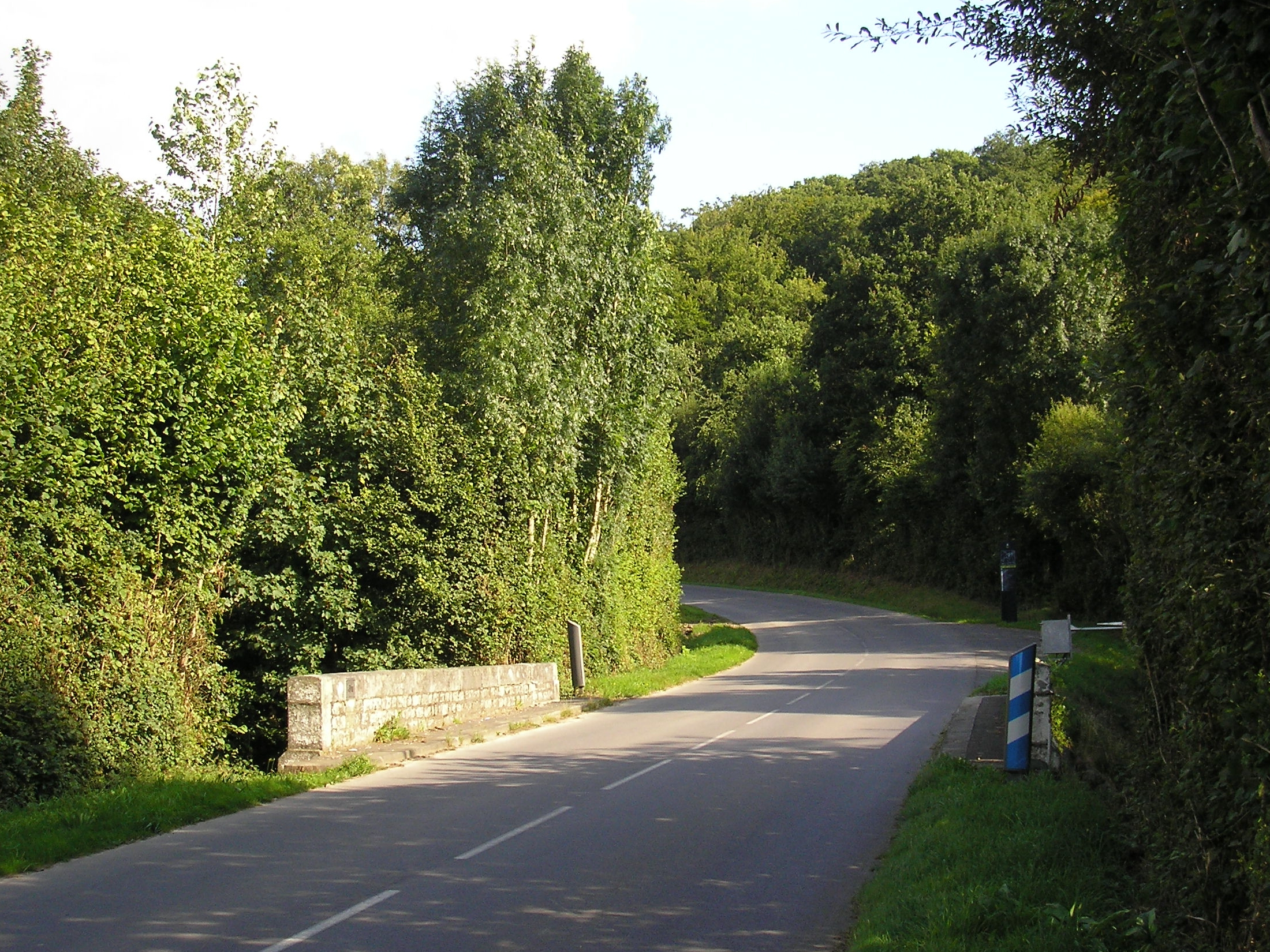
Taureau bridge

- Le viaduc de la Souleuvre : inspired by the art of Gustave Eiffel, its metal duct was destroyed in 1970. One of the pillars is a bungee platform still.
- Taureau bridge (2 km downstream) : named after "The Black Bull", emblem of the British 11th Armoured Division, which crossed the bridge during Operation Bluecoat on July 31, 1944. It was surprisingly ignored by the Allies and German surveillance.
- Les gorges de la Vire : the prolongation of la vallée de la Souleuvre.

== Environment ==
The Souleuvre basin is a Natura 2000 marked site, namely for its white-clawed crayfish and sculpin population, as well as European brook lamprey and Atlantic salmon.
