= Malloué =

- Part of Souleuvre-en-Bocage
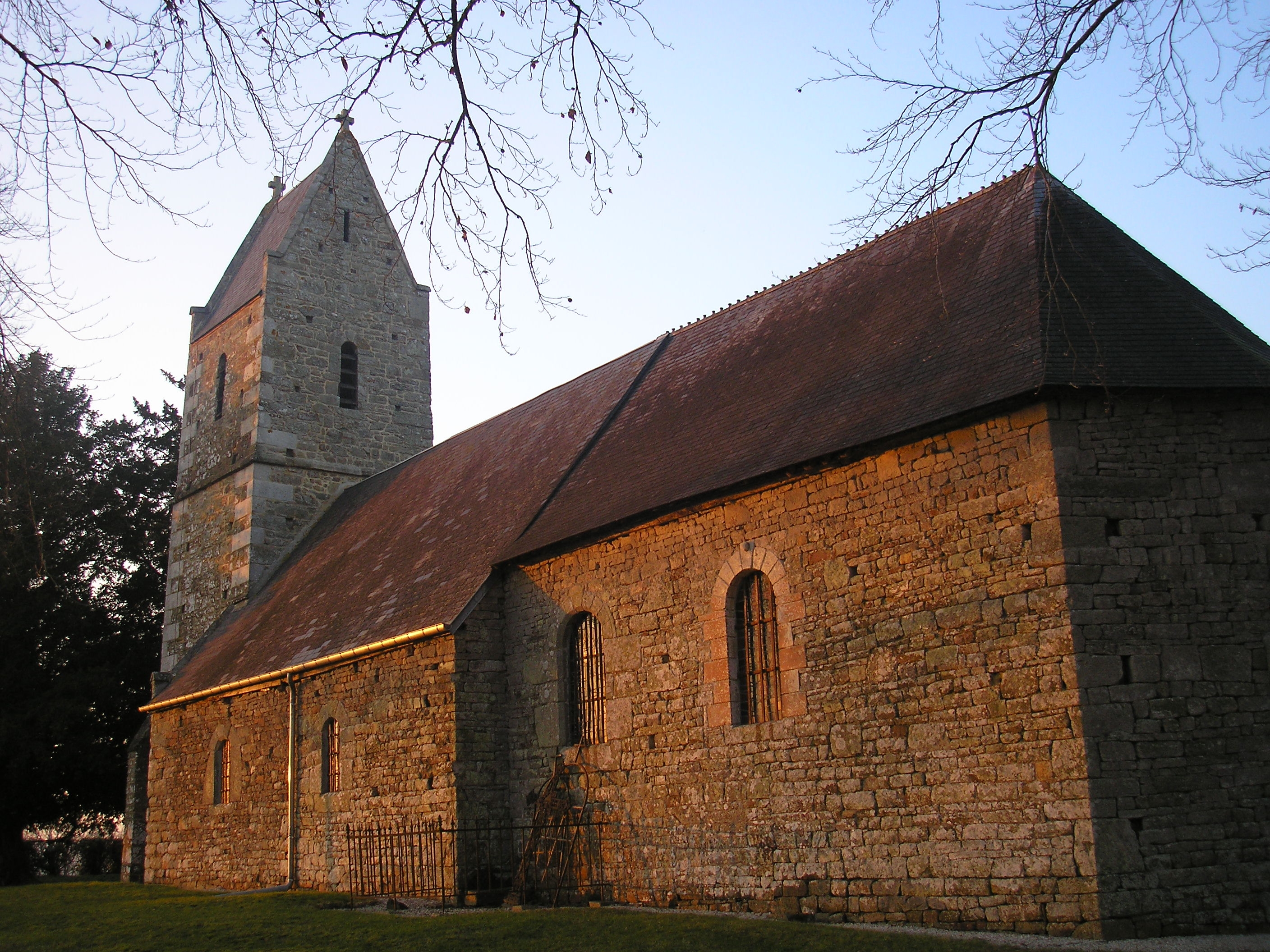
- Location of Malloué
- Location within France Location within Normandy
- Coordinates: 48°57′07″N 0°57′01″W
- Country: France
- Region: Normandy
- Department: Calvados
- Arrondissement: Vire
- Canton: Condé-en-Normandie
- Commune: Souleuvre-en-Bocage
- Area^{1}: 1.27 km^{2} (0.49 sq mi)
- Highest elevation: 207 m (679 ft)
- Lowest elevation: 62 m (203 ft)
- Population (2023): 22
  - Density: 17/km^{2} (45/sq mi)
- Time zone: UTC+01:00 (CET)
  - Summer (DST): UTC+02:00 (CEST)
- Postal code: 14350
- ^{1} French Land Register data, which excludes lakes, ponds, glaciers > 1 km^{2} (0.386 sq mi or 247 acres) and river estuaries.

Malloué (French pronunciation: [malwe]) is a former commune in the Calvados department and Normandy region in northwestern France. On 1 January 2016, it was merged into the new commune of Souleuvre-en-Bocage.

== See also ==
- Communes of the Calvados department
