= Le Bény-Bocage =

- Part of Souleuvre-en-Bocage
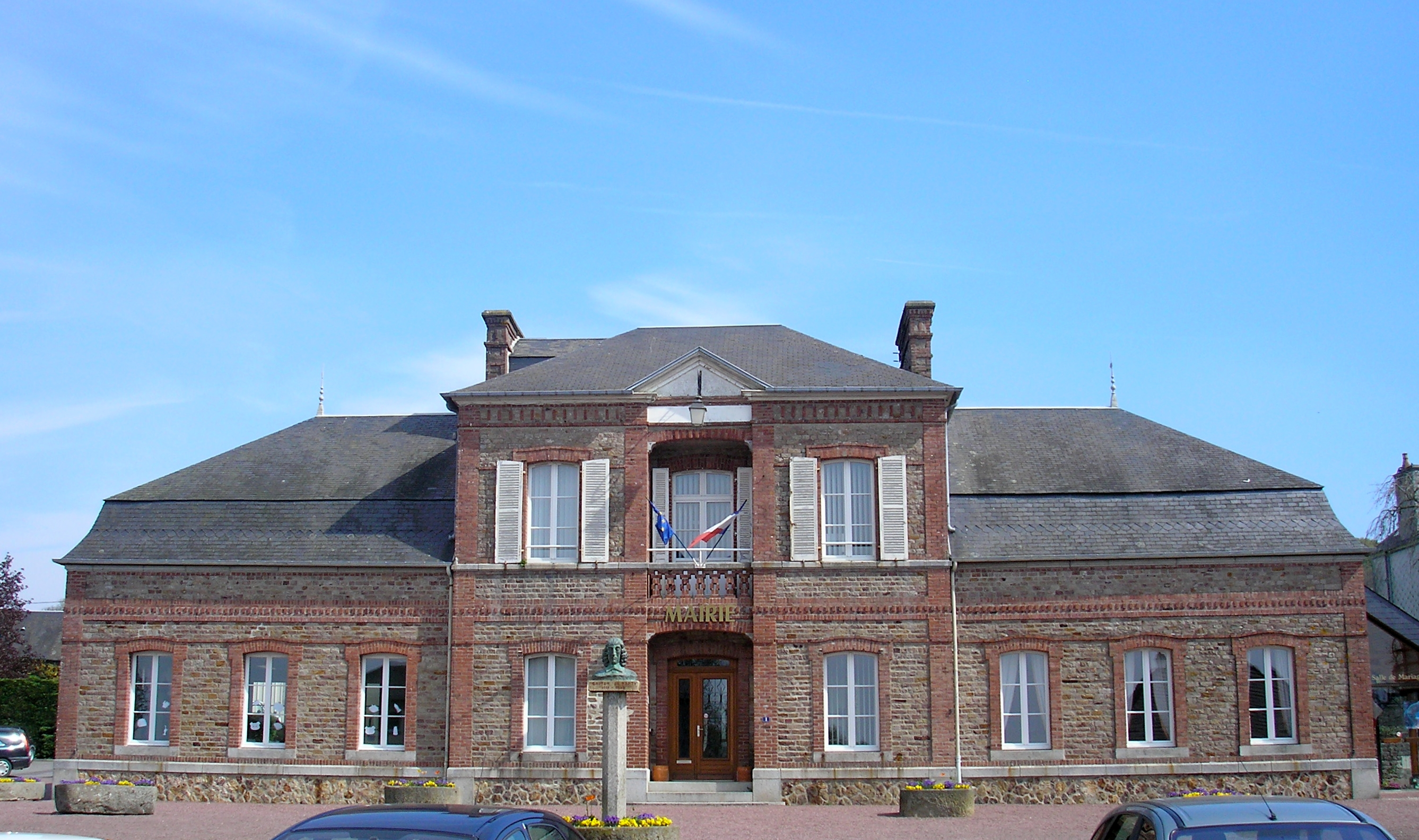
- Town hall
- Location of Le Bény-Bocage
- Location within France Location within Normandy
- Coordinates: 48°56′16″N 0°50′17″W
- Country: France
- Region: Normandy
- Department: Calvados
- Arrondissement: Vire
- Canton: Condé-en-Normandie
- Commune: Souleuvre-en-Bocage
- Area^{1}: 8.91 km^{2} (3.44 sq mi)
- Elevation: 300 m (980 ft)
- Highest elevation: 262 m (860 ft)
- Lowest elevation: 84 m (276 ft)
- Population (2023): 987
  - Density: 111/km^{2} (287/sq mi)
- Time zone: UTC+01:00 (CET)
  - Summer (DST): UTC+02:00 (CEST)
- Postal code: 14350
- ^{1} French Land Register data, which excludes lakes, ponds, glaciers > 1 km^{2} (0.386 sq mi or 247 acres) and river estuaries.

Le Bény-Bocage (French pronunciation: [lə beni bɔkaʒ]) is a former commune in the Calvados department in the Normandy region in northwestern France. On 1 January 2016, it was merged into the new commune of Souleuvre-en-Bocage.

== Personalities ==
- Baron Gaston Jean Baptiste de Renty, French mystic.

== See also ==
- Communes of the Calvados department
