= Beaulieu, Calvados =

Beaulieu
- Part of Souleuvre-en-Bocage
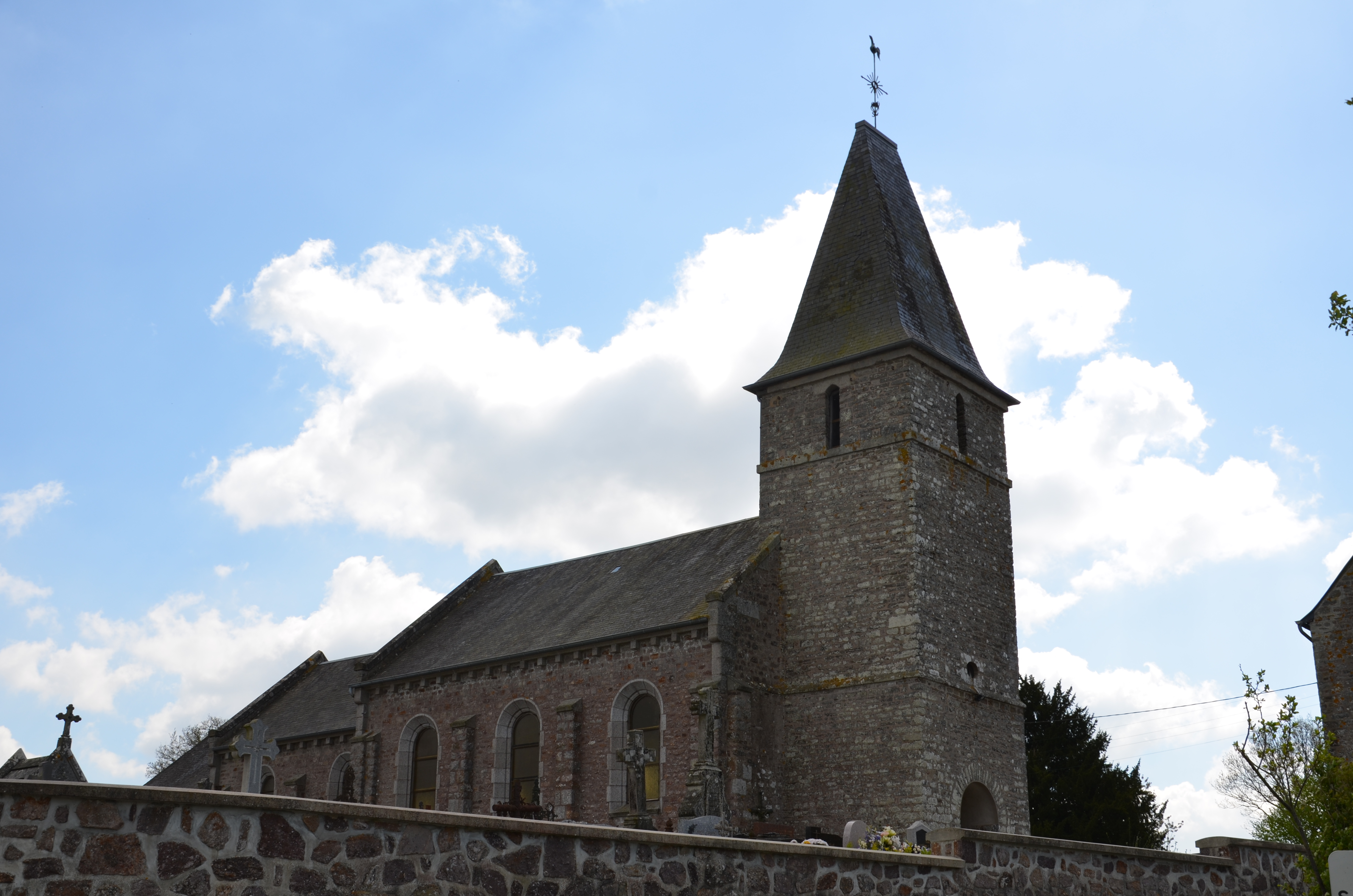
- Location of Beaulieu
- Location within France Location within Normandy
- Coordinates: 48°54′37″N 0°49′08″W
- Country: France
- Region: Normandy
- Department: Calvados
- Arrondissement: Vire
- Canton: Condé-en-Normandie
- Commune: Souleuvre-en-Bocage
- Area^{1}: 3.15 km^{2} (1.22 sq mi)
- Elevation: 150 m (490 ft)
- Highest elevation: 175 m (574 ft)
- Lowest elevation: 110 m (360 ft)
- Population (2023): 189
  - Density: 60.0/km^{2} (155/sq mi)
- Time zone: UTC+01:00 (CET)
  - Summer (DST): UTC+02:00 (CEST)
- Postal code: 14350
- ^{1} French Land Register data, which excludes lakes, ponds, glaciers > 1 km^{2} (0.386 sq mi or 247 acres) and river estuaries.

Beaulieu (French pronunciation: [boljø]) is a former commune in the Calvados department in the Normandy region in northwestern France. On 1 January 2016, it was merged into the new commune of Souleuvre-en-Bocage.

Beaulieu is situated 10 km northeast of Vire and 45 km southwest of Caen.

== See also ==
- Communes of the Calvados department
