= Saint-Martin-des-Besaces =

- Part of Souleuvre-en-Bocage
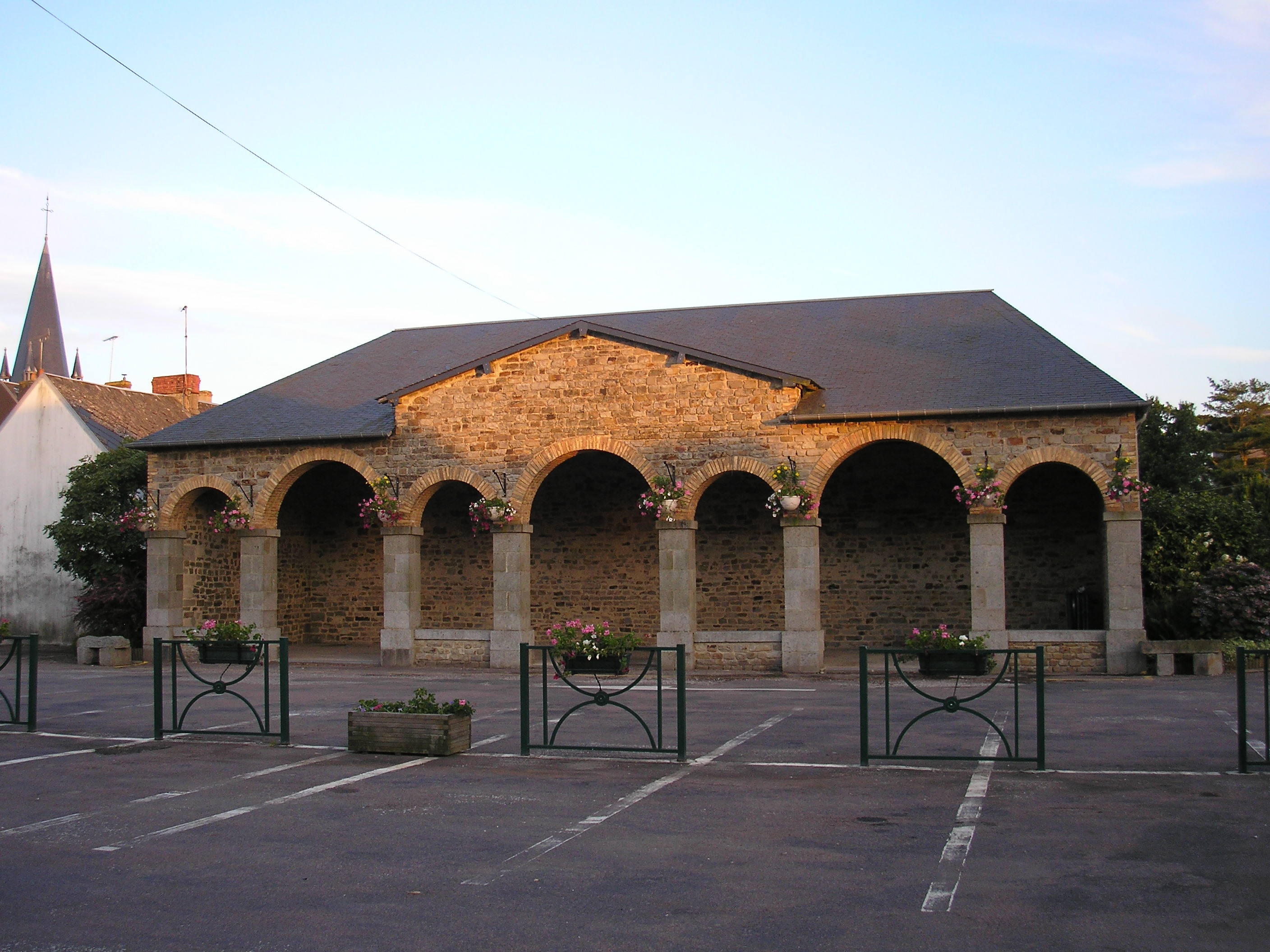
- Covered market
- Location of Saint-Martin-des-Besaces
- Location within France Location within Normandy
- Coordinates: 49°00′43″N 0°50′41″W
- Country: France
- Region: Normandy
- Department: Calvados
- Arrondissement: Vire
- Canton: Condé-en-Normandie
- Commune: Souleuvre-en-Bocage
- Area^{1}: 22.03 km^{2} (8.51 sq mi)
- Elevation: 220 m (720 ft)
- Highest elevation: 308 m (1,010 ft)
- Lowest elevation: 115 m (377 ft)
- Population (2022): 1,193
  - Density: 54.15/km^{2} (140.3/sq mi)
- Time zone: UTC+01:00 (CET)
  - Summer (DST): UTC+02:00 (CEST)
- Postal code: 14350
- ^{1} French Land Register data, which excludes lakes, ponds, glaciers > 1 km^{2} (0.386 sq mi or 247 acres) and river estuaries.

Saint-Martin-des-Besaces (French pronunciation: [sɛ̃ maʁtɛ̃ de bəzas]) is a former commune in the Calvados department in the Normandy region in northwestern France. On 1 January 2016, it was merged into the new commune of Souleuvre-en-Bocage.

== Population ==
Historical population
Year	Pop.	±% p.a.
1975	1,049	—
1982	981	−0.95%
1990	986	+0.06%
1999	1,061	+0.82%
2006	1,139	+1.02%
2022	1,193	+0.29%
Source: EHESS and INSEE

== See also ==
- Communes of the Calvados department
