= Campeaux =

Campeaux is the name of two communes in France:

- Campeaux, Calvados
- Campeaux, Oise
