= Tank desant =

Military combined arms tactic

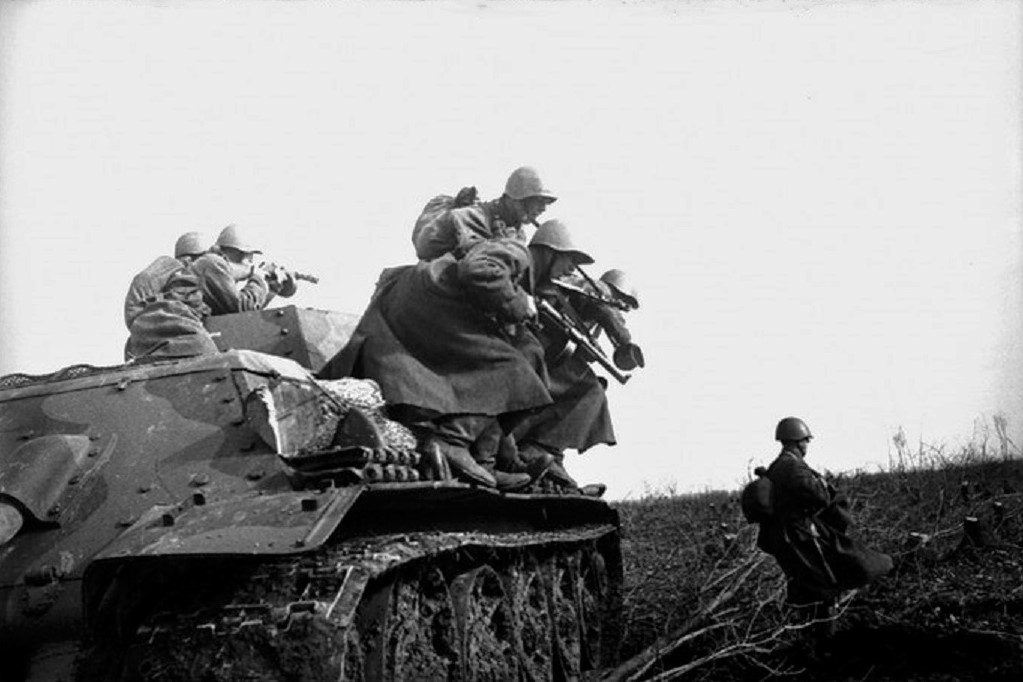
Red Army soldiers dismounting a T-34 tank, 1942

Tank desant (Russian: танковый десант, tankovyy desant) is a military combined arms tactic where infantry soldiers ride into an attack on tanks, then dismount to fight on foot in the final phase of the assault. Note that this differs from infantry troops merely riding on tanks as a form of ad-hoc transportation. Desant (from the French: descendre, "to disembark") is a pan-Slavic general term for airborne forces and amphibious warfare.

The tactic was used as an expedient by the Red Army during World War II. Tank desant troops (tankodesantniki) were infantry trained in the tactic to offer small-arms support in suppression of enemy anti-tank weapons or enemy infantry using anti-tank grenades. After the war, T-55 and T-62 tanks were built with hand-holds for this purpose. In northern areas during winter, similar tactics were used by Soviet infantry riding the skids of aerosani or towed behind them.

Nowadays, this tactic is rare in well-equipped armed forces, with front-line troops usually riding in armoured personnel carriers or infantry fighting vehicles. However, Soviet troops used it regularly in the Soviet–Afghan War, and tank desant was employed on a massive scale by Russia and Ukraine during the Russian invasion of Ukraine.

== Usage ==
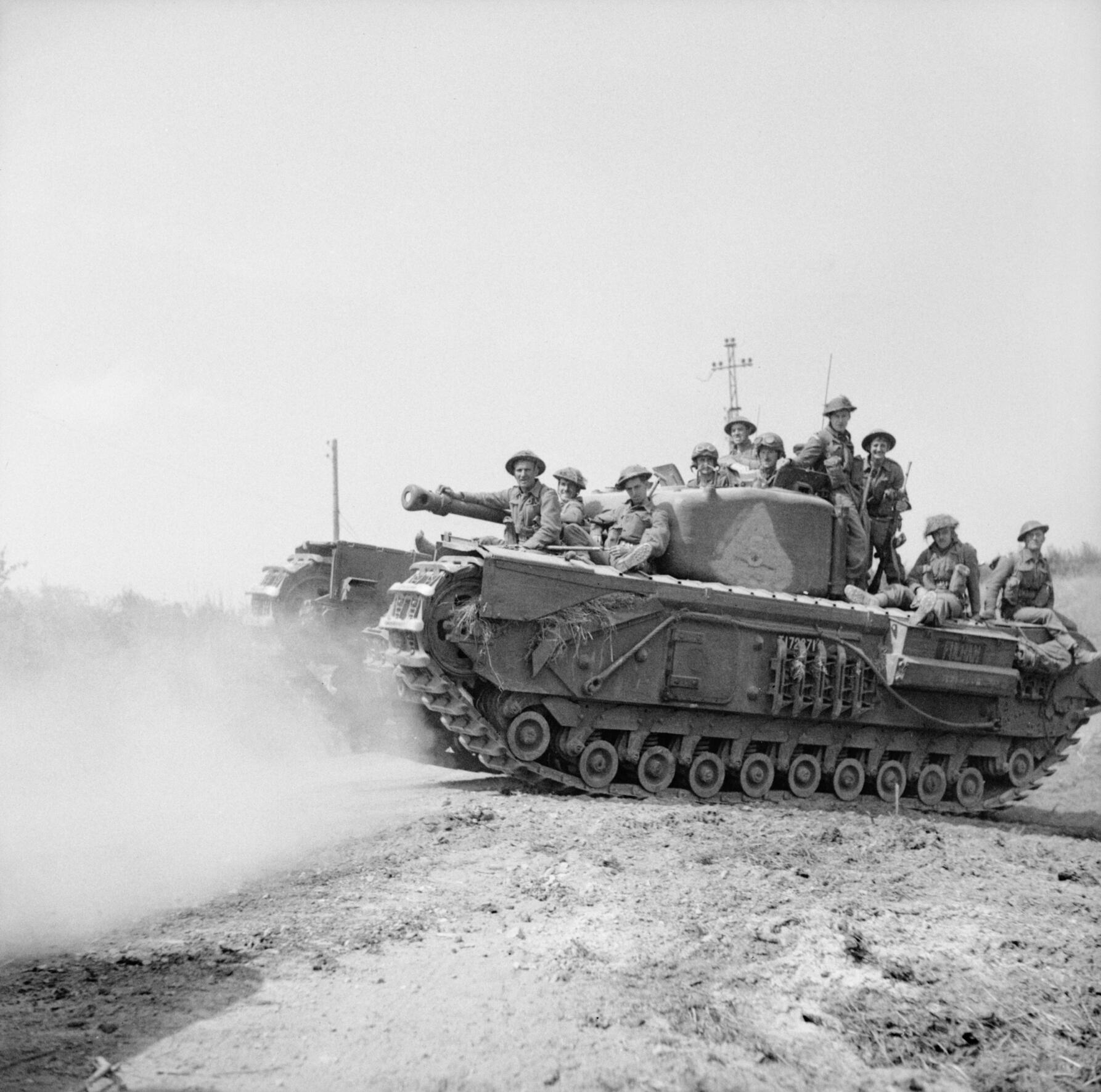
Churchill tank carrying infantry desant in Saint-Pierre-Tarentaine (Normandy), 3 August 1944

The tank desant tactic, like more conventional airborne and amphibious operations, was used to achieve fundamental goals of maneuver warfare: "surprise, leverage, simultaneity and interchangeability".

The use of tank desant was only prescribed within the first kilometer of the forward edge of the combat area for only the simplest of tactical mission objectives, since the circumstances would be difficult for the troops engaged.

Riding on tanks during actual combat is very dangerous. Tank riders are very vulnerable to machine gun and high explosive fire, and the high silhouette of most tanks would draw enemy fire. Smoke and covering fire may be used to reduce the hazards. Tank riding is mostly used when troops need to move faster than is possible on foot and there is a shortage of motor transport or armoured personnel carriers.

Usually, the infantry and their heavy weapons were assigned to specific tanks well before the execution of the mission. This allowed the infantry to become familiar with the tanks and train with the tank crews. Support platforms for the heavy weapons were sometimes attached to the tanks to allow firing on the move. Ropes were attached to provide hand-holds for the infantry. The number of infantry assigned to a tank depended on the class of the tank; the usual numbers were:

- Heavy tank, 10–12 soldiers
- Medium tank, 8–10 soldiers
- Light tank, 5–6 soldiers

Tank desant would be used in such a way as to ensure surprise, approaching during a snow storm or mist or employing either smoke grenades or a smoke screen prepared by sappers or laid down by artillery.

== History ==
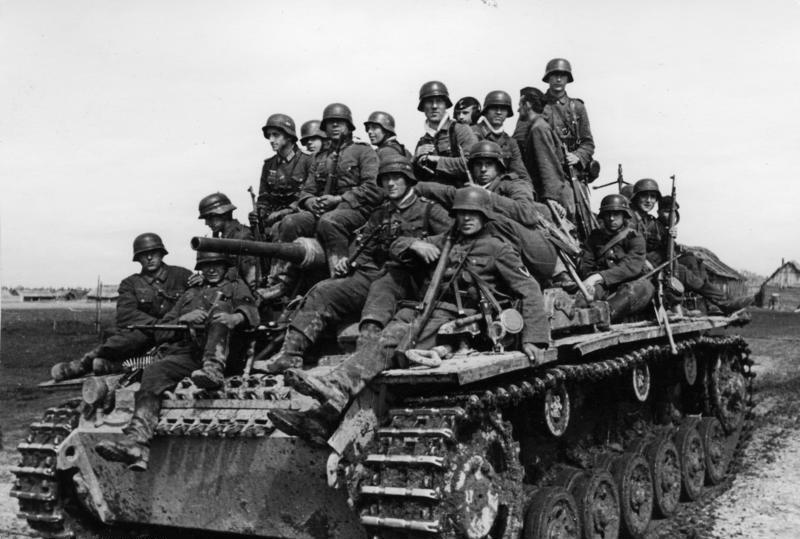
A German Panzer III carries infantry desant through the USSR in 1942

Today, tank desant is considered a wasteful and human-costly improvisation, which, in the opinion of some writers, was adopted by the Red Army because they failed to appreciate the problem of tank–infantry cooperation. However, there is evidence that tank desant was used as early as 1937 during the Spanish Civil War. On 13 October, during the Aragon Front advance in the area of the Fuentes de Ebro, the 1st Independent Tank Regiment (Republican Army), using BT-5 tanks attached to the XV International Brigade, conducted a tank desant mission with the attached 24th Infantry Battalion of the Spanish army (24ta de Voluntarios, commanded by Captain Aquilla). But lack of coordination and communication between the Soviet crews, who had just completed a 630 kilometres (390 mi) march, and the Spanish infantry resulted in sixteen tanks being either destroyed or disabled (some salvaged) and 37 tank crewmen becoming casualties.

Analysis of the Red Army's doctrine developed during the 1930s and documented in the 1936 Field Manual shows that the cavalry arm was expected to perform in the role of supporting dismounted infantry and this was repeatedly displayed during the operations on the Eastern Front through use of the cavalry mechanized groups. The idea of using infantry tank desant was, however, retained in the 1942 Field Instructions for the infantry (battalion).

Almost universal mechanization has, in theory, rendered this tactic mostly obsolete among the more advanced armed forces, with infantry riding special-purpose armoured personnel carriers or infantry fighting vehicles into battle. The use of active protection systems (especially hard kill types such as Arena) and/or explosive reactive armour, which creates a danger zone around an armoured vehicle by detonating an explosive charge when the tank suffers a serious hit, along with gas turbine engines in some tank designs, with their extremely hot exhaust, makes tank desant generally a dangerous and undesirable alternative.

=== Modern usage ===
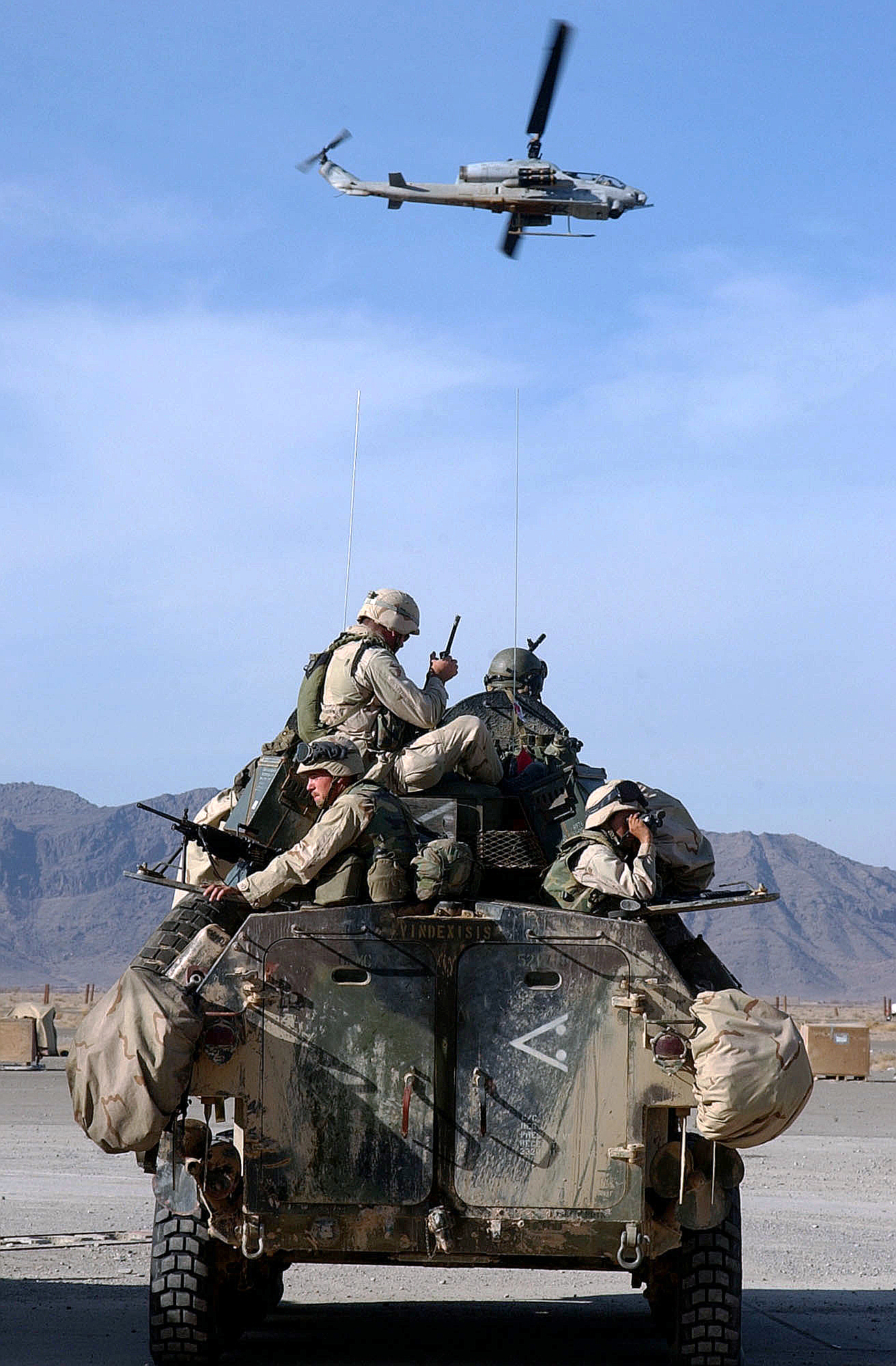
US Marines riding desant on top of an LAV-25 IFV in December 2001, during the War in Afghanistan

Other military forces, including the United States Army in the Vietnam War, Sino Vietnamese War, the Soviet Army in the Soviet–Afghan War, and the Russian Ground Forces in the First Chechen War, have chosen to ride atop their carriers while on patrol or routine movement, rather than inside them.

In contrast to the offensive Soviet tank desant tactics of World War II, these were soldiers who wanted to be able to move from their vehicles quickly in case of ambush (which often turned their transports into death traps). Fearing land mines and rocket-propelled grenades widely used by guerrillas, these soldiers refused to stay inside the personnel carriers—contravening normal standing orders for several reasons:

- The infantrymen on the outside represented more eyes and rifles at the ready to locate and fire upon a small force or single ambusher.
- Explosive concussion inside the personnel compartment, caused by a rocket-propelled grenade or land mine hitting the armour, was said to be more dangerous than enemy fire on the personnel mounted outside. Many of these soldiers wore body armor, which reduced their fear of small-arms fire. Spall liners have only recently become common.
- Wounded soldiers trapped inside were very unlikely to be extracted safely until after the battle, especially if the vehicle was on fire.

Soviet soldiers also adopted the tactic of riding the roofs of their BTRs (armoured personnel carriers), BMP-1s, BMD-1s, and, more rarely, tanks. During the Second Chechen War and other local conflicts of the post-Soviet era, the units of the Russian military and law enforcement acquired the tactic, making it a routine. However, riding outside the vehicles is still prohibited by Russian military doctrine, so it is not used during training and maneuvers.

Tank desant was employed in combat during hostilities between the Ukrainian Army and Russian and Russian-backed forces in the 2015 Battle of Debaltseve. It was used in the Ukrainian withdrawal from Debaltseve and the surrounding region, so as to avoid being encircled.

== Gallery ==
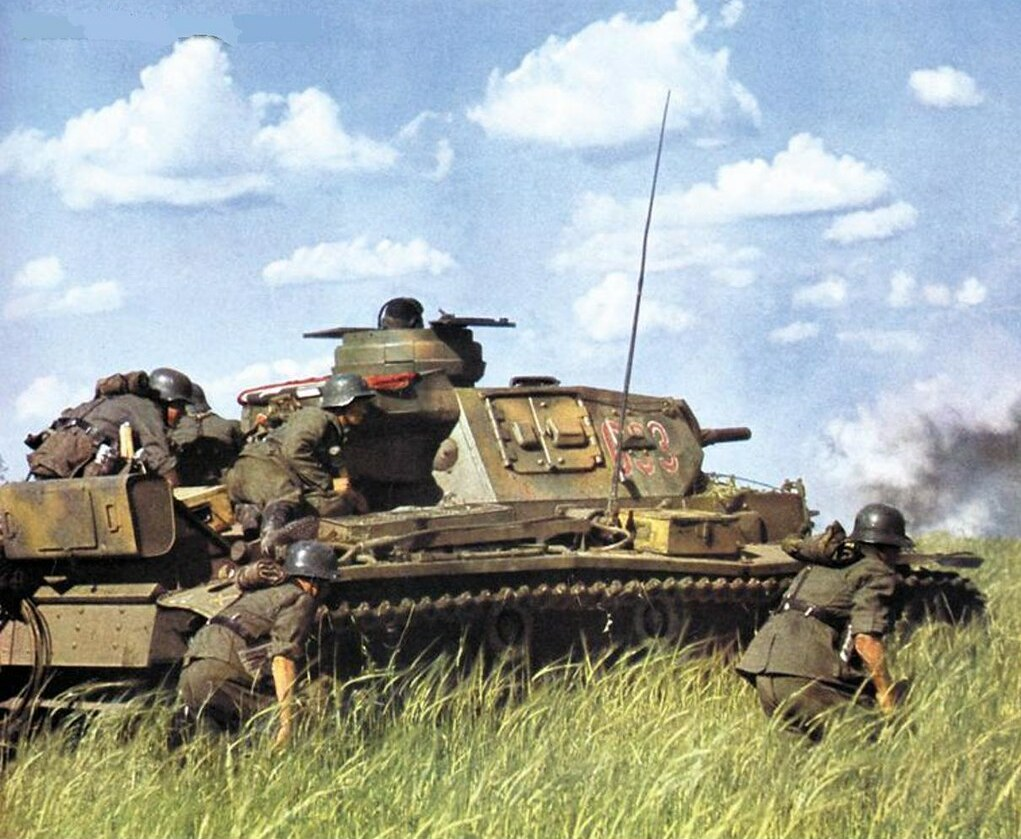
German infantry desant, during an advance, 1941

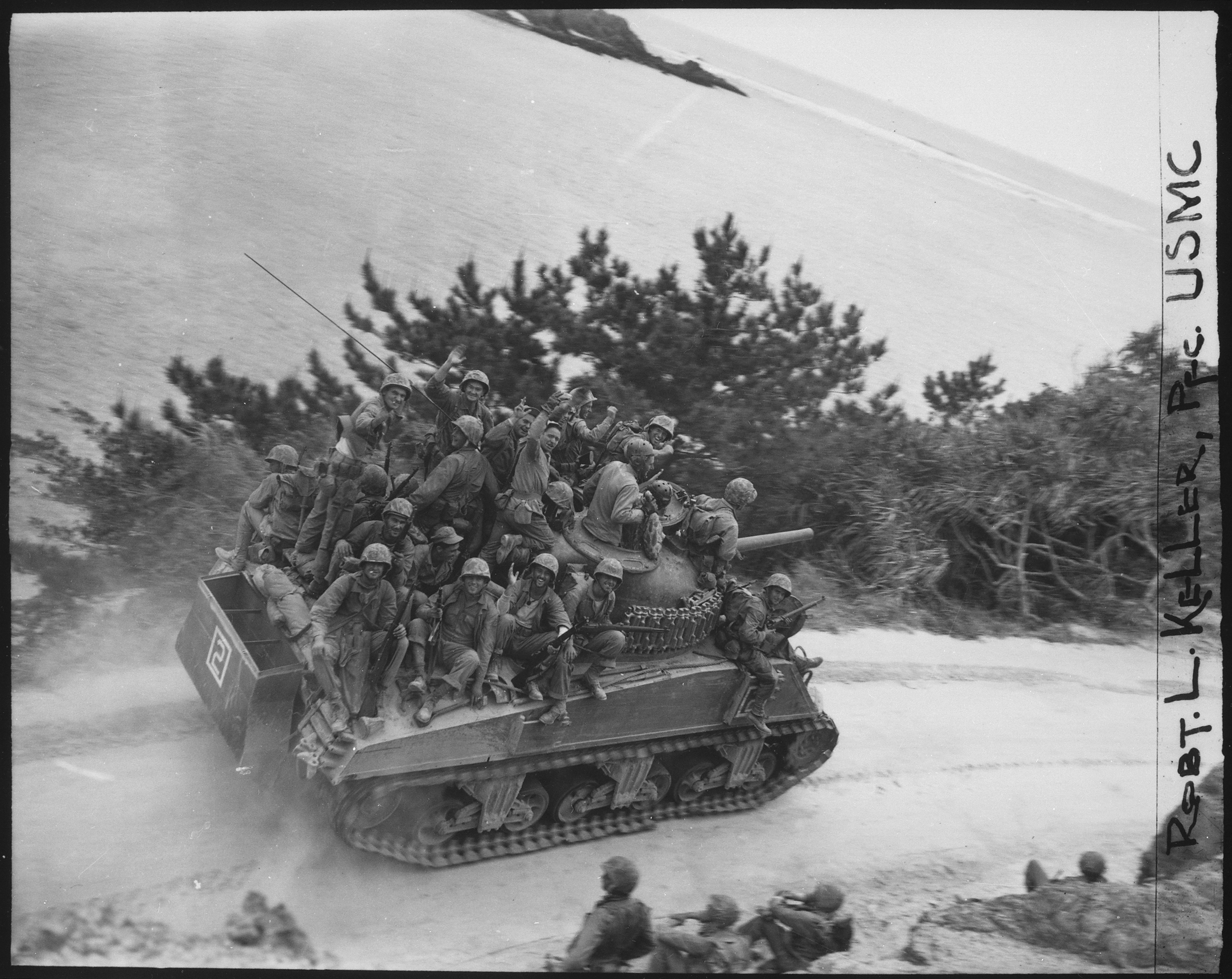
Tank-borne infantry desant on M4 Sherman, of the 29th Marines, Okinawa, 1945

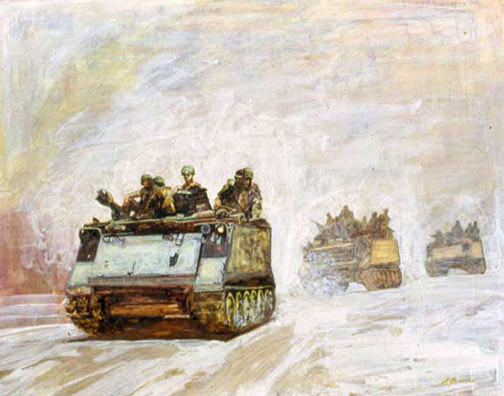
APC by David E. Graves, Vietnam Combat Artists Program, CAT IX, 1969–70. Courtesy of National Museum of the U.S. Army

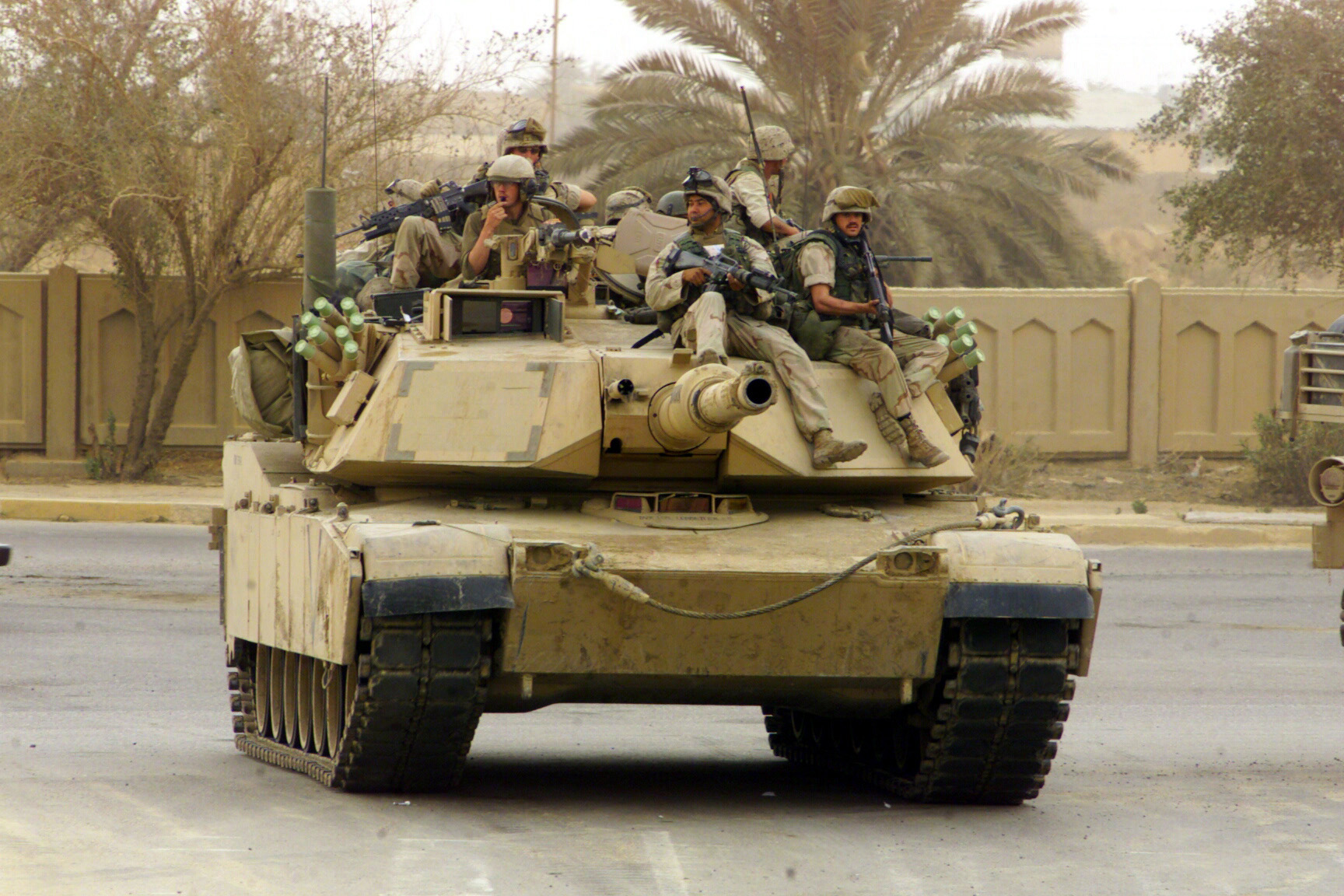
U.S. Marines ride desant aboard an M1A1 Abrams tank in Baghdad, Iraq in April 2003

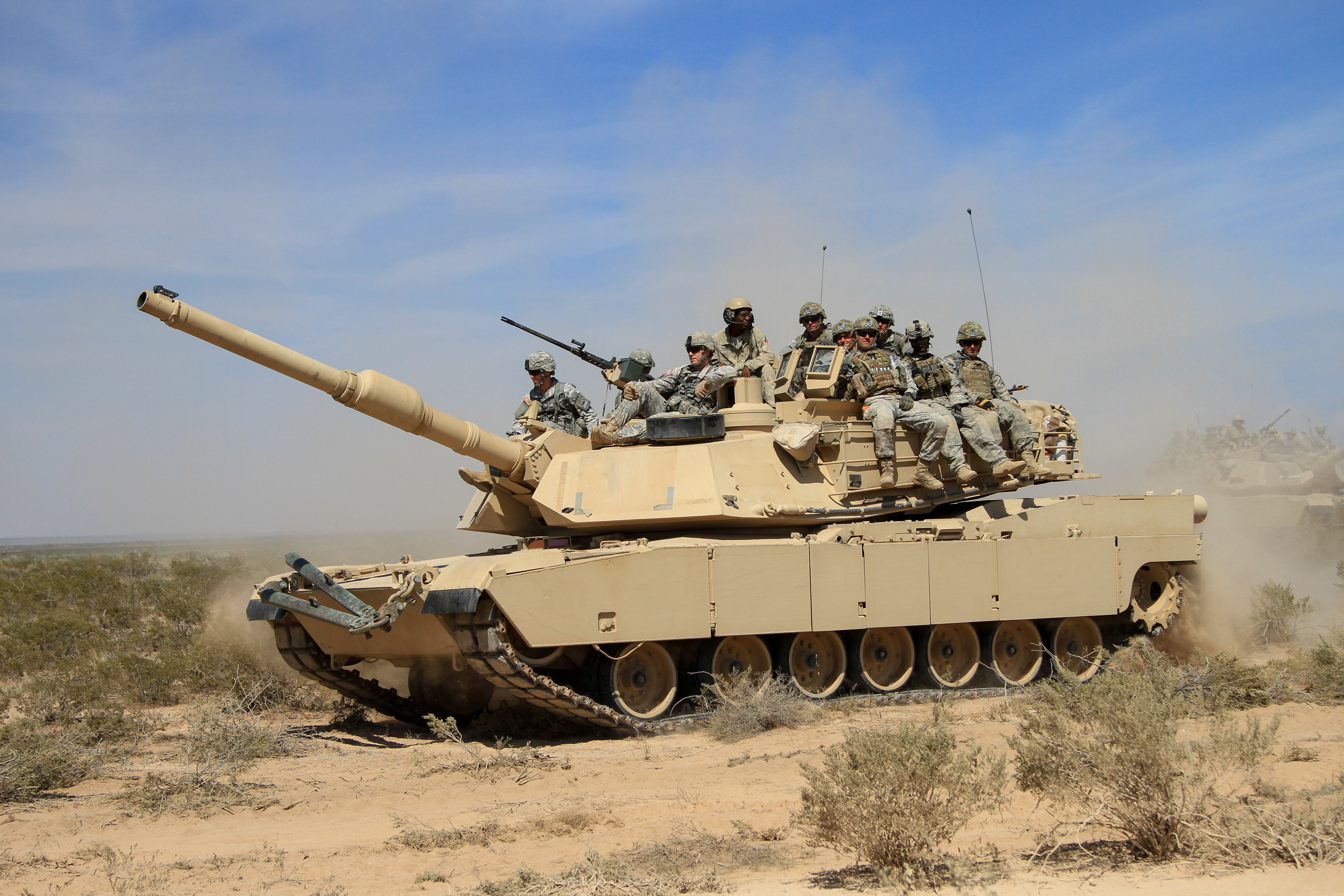
82nd Airborne paratroopers ride on an M1A2 Abrams tank

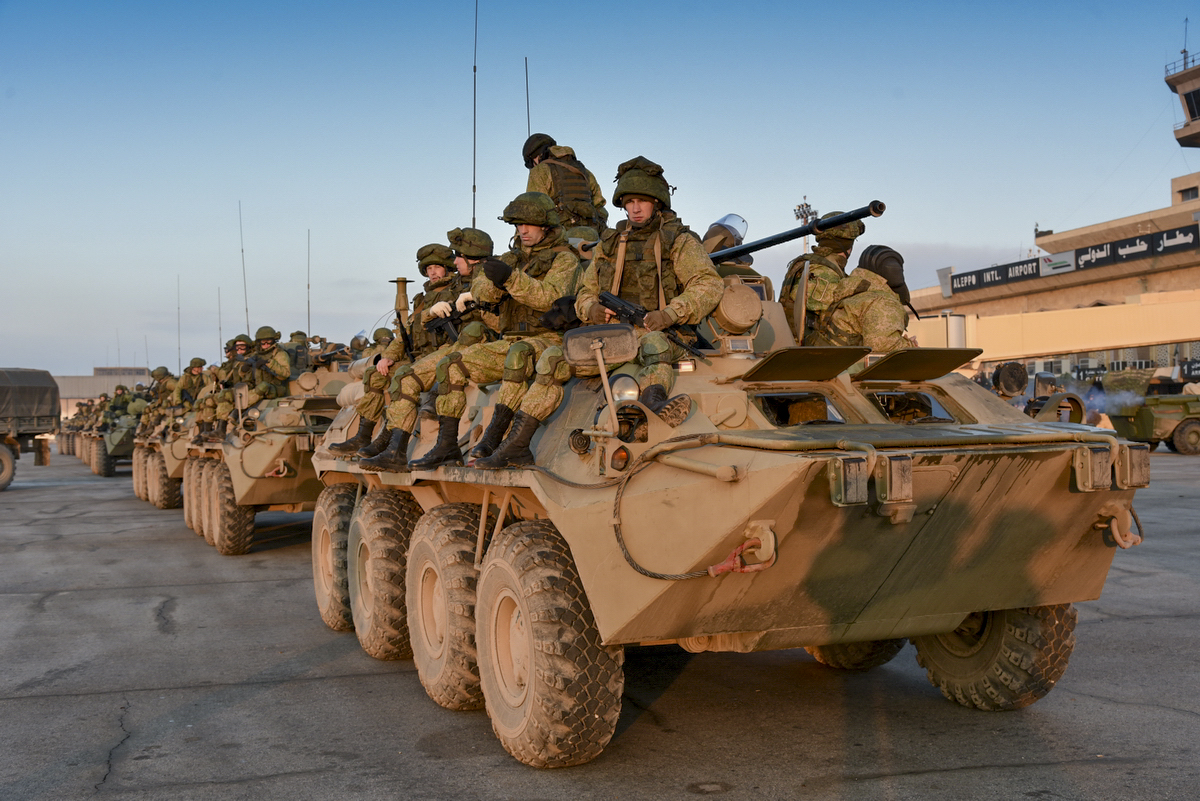
Russian Engineer Troops ride desant aboard BTR-82As in Aleppo, Syria, in December 2016

== See also ==
- BMP development
- M113 APC in the Vietnam War
- Mechanized infantry and motorized infantry
- Panzergrenadier

== General and cited references ==
- No.2, 1944 (Military Herald) (in Russian)
- Simpkin, Richard; Erickson, John. Deep Battle: The Brainchild of Marshal Tukhachevskii, Brassey's, London, 1987
- Zaloga, Steven J. (1999). "Soviet Tank Operations in the Spanish Civil War", in Journal of Slavic Military Studies vol. 12, no. 3, September 1999.
