= Saint-Martin-Don =

- Part of Souleuvre-en-Bocage
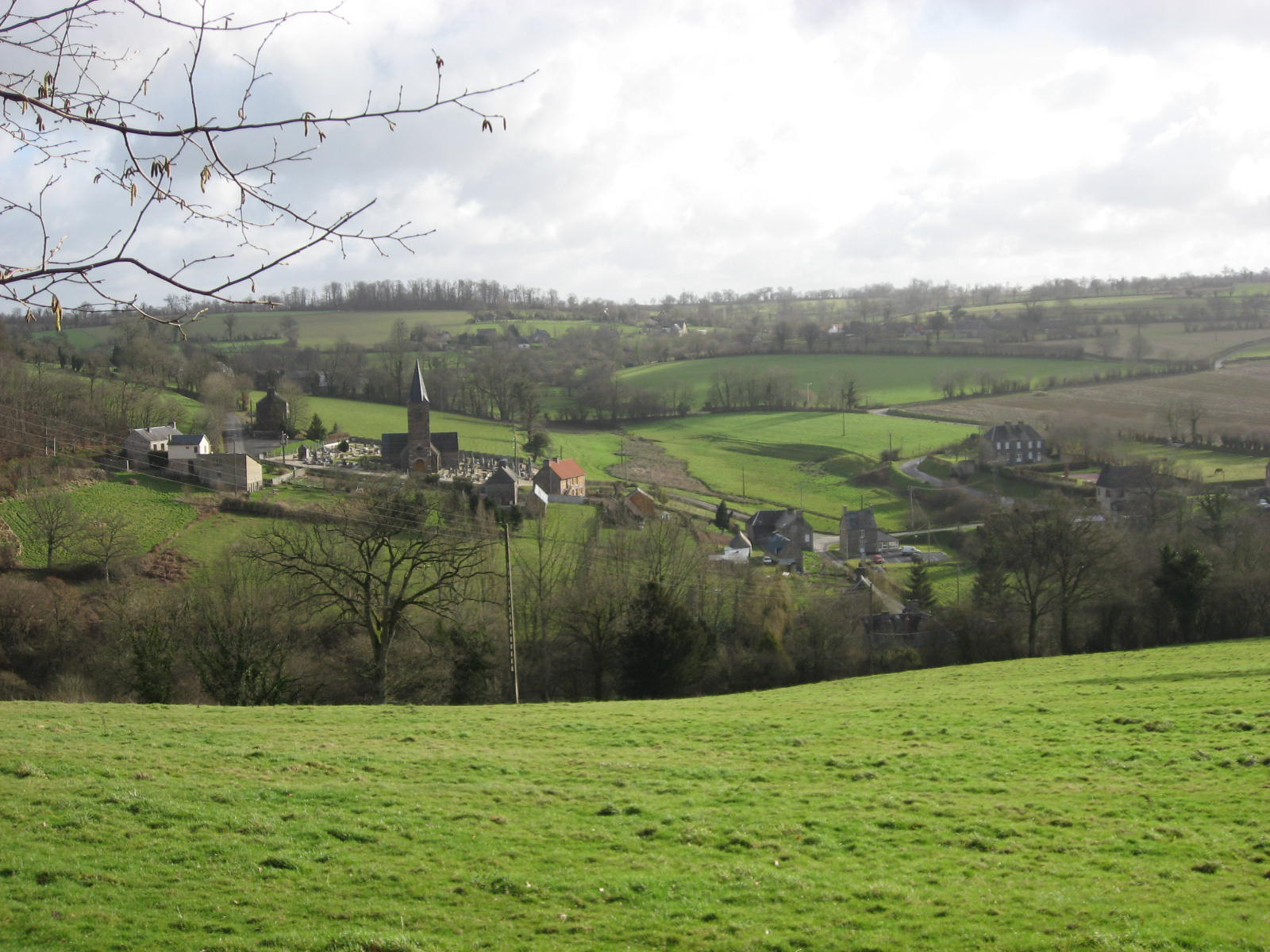

- Coat of arms
- Location of Saint-Martin-Don
- Location within France Location within Normandy
- Coordinates: 48°55′44″N 0°56′39″W
- Country: France
- Region: Normandy
- Department: Calvados
- Arrondissement: Vire
- Canton: Condé-en-Normandie
- Commune: Souleuvre-en-Bocage
- Area^{1}: 7.6 km^{2} (2.9 sq mi)
- Elevation: 99 m (325 ft)
- Highest elevation: 204 m (669 ft)
- Lowest elevation: 64 m (210 ft)
- Population (2023): 223
  - Density: 29/km^{2} (76/sq mi)
- Time zone: UTC+01:00 (CET)
  - Summer (DST): UTC+02:00 (CEST)
- Postal code: 14350
- ^{1} French Land Register data, which excludes lakes, ponds, glaciers > 1 km^{2} (0.386 sq mi or 247 acres) and river estuaries.

Saint-Martin-Don (French pronunciation: [sɛ̃ maʁtɛ̃ dɔ̃]) is a former commune in the Calvados department in the Normandy region in northwestern France. On 1 January 2016, it was merged into the new commune of Souleuvre-en-Bocage.

== See also ==
- Communes of the Calvados department
