= Mont-Bertrand =

- Part of Souleuvre-en-Bocage
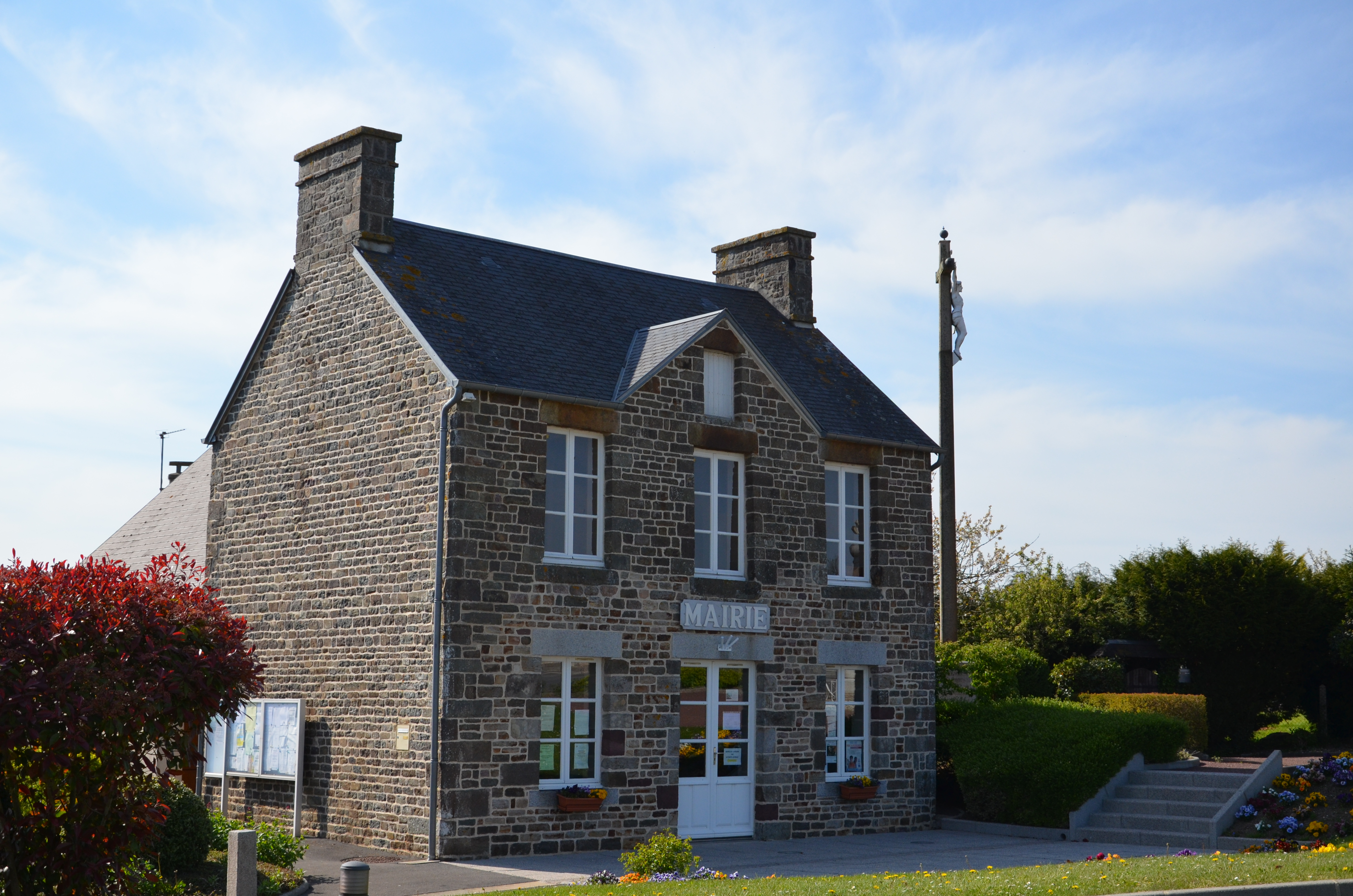
- Location of Mont-Bertrand
- Location within France Location within Normandy
- Coordinates: 48°58′02″N 0°54′55″W
- Country: France
- Region: Normandy
- Department: Calvados
- Arrondissement: Vire
- Canton: Condé-en-Normandie
- Commune: Souleuvre-en-Bocage
- Area^{1}: 6.33 km^{2} (2.44 sq mi)
- Elevation: 200 m (660 ft)
- Highest elevation: 247 m (810 ft)
- Lowest elevation: 102 m (335 ft)
- Population (2023): 223
  - Density: 35.2/km^{2} (91.2/sq mi)
- Time zone: UTC+01:00 (CET)
  - Summer (DST): UTC+02:00 (CEST)
- Postal code: 14350
- ^{1} French Land Register data, which excludes lakes, ponds, glaciers > 1 km^{2} (0.386 sq mi or 247 acres) and river estuaries.

Mont-Bertrand (French pronunciation: [mɔ̃ bɛʁtʁɑ̃]) is a former commune in the Calvados department in the Normandy region in northwestern France. On 1 January 2016, it was merged into the new commune of Souleuvre-en-Bocage.

== See also ==
- Communes of the Calvados department
