= Étouvy =

- Part of Souleuvre-en-Bocage
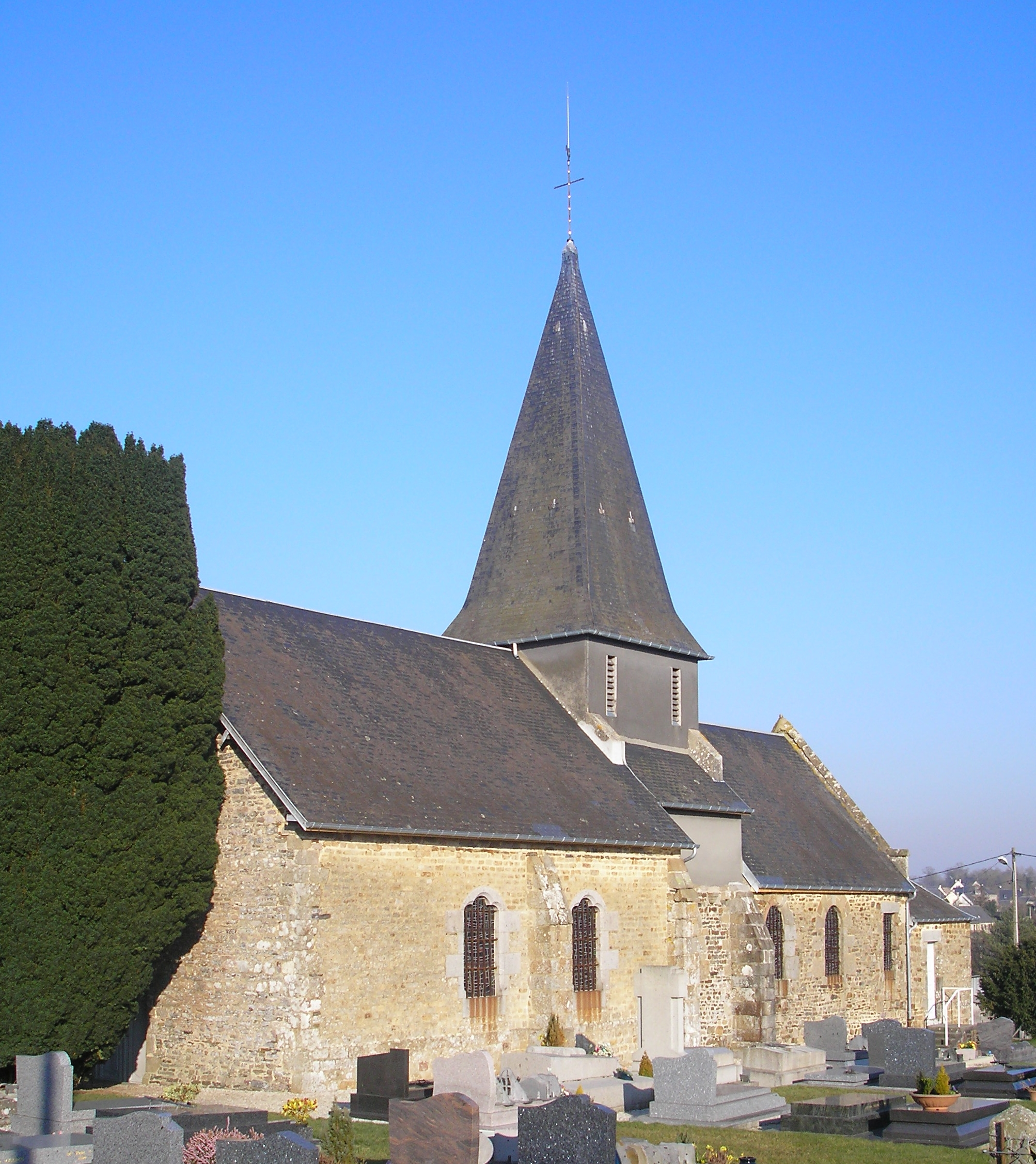
- St. Martin
- Location of Étouvy
- Location within France Location within Normandy
- Coordinates: 48°53′39″N 0°53′19″W
- Country: France
- Region: Normandy
- Department: Calvados
- Arrondissement: Vire
- Canton: Condé-en-Normandie
- Commune: Souleuvre-en-Bocage
- Area^{1}: 2.29 km^{2} (0.88 sq mi)
- Elevation: 120 m (390 ft)
- Highest elevation: 134 m (440 ft)
- Lowest elevation: 82 m (269 ft)
- Population (2023): 256
  - Density: 112/km^{2} (290/sq mi)
- Time zone: UTC+01:00 (CET)
  - Summer (DST): UTC+02:00 (CEST)
- Postal code: 14350
- ^{1} French Land Register data, which excludes lakes, ponds, glaciers > 1 km^{2} (0.386 sq mi or 247 acres) and river estuaries.

Étouvy (French pronunciation: [etuvi]) is a former commune in the Calvados department in the Normandy region in northwestern France. On 1 January 2016, it was merged into the new commune of Souleuvre-en-Bocage.

== See also ==
- Communes of the Calvados department
