= Souleuvre en Bocage =

- Commune
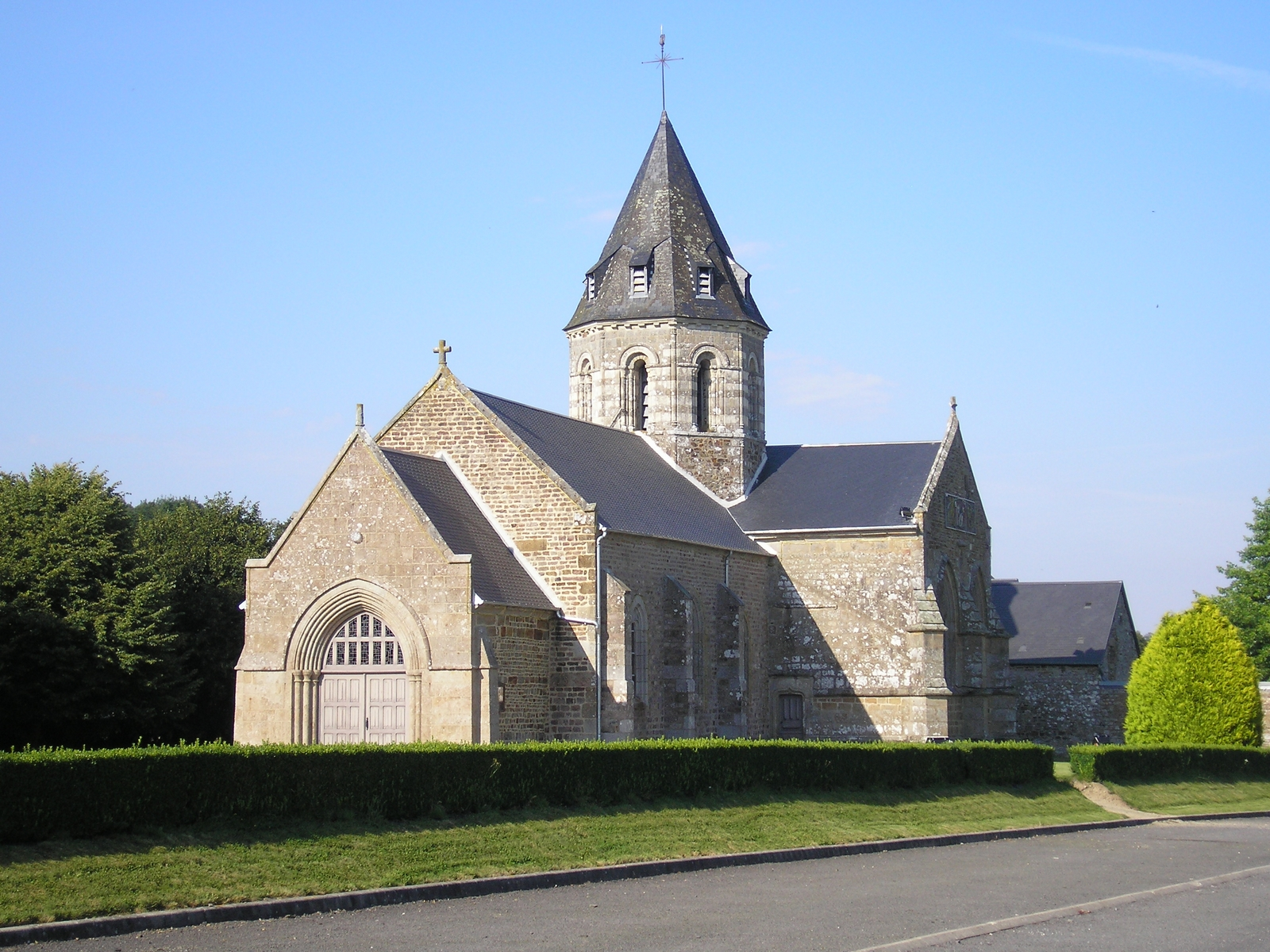
- The church in Sainte-Marie-Laumont
- Location of Souleuvre en Bocage
- Location within France Location within Normandy
- Coordinates: 48°56′17″N 0°50′31″W
- Country: France
- Region: Normandy
- Department: Calvados
- Arrondissement: Vire
- Canton: Condé-en-Normandie
- Intercommunality: Intercom de la Vire au Noireau
- Area^{1}: 187.28 km^{2} (72.31 sq mi)
- Population (2023): 8,629
  - Density: 46.08/km^{2} (119.3/sq mi)
- Time zone: UTC+01:00 (CET)
  - Summer (DST): UTC+02:00 (CEST)
- INSEE/Postal code: 14061 /14350
- ^{1} French Land Register data, which excludes lakes, ponds, glaciers > 1 km^{2} (0.386 sq mi or 247 acres) and river estuaries.

Souleuvre en Bocage (French pronunciation: [sulœvʁ ɑ̃ bɔkaʒ], literally Souleuvre in Bocage) is a commune in the department of Calvados, northwestern France.

The municipality was established on 1 January 2016 by merger of the twenty former communes of Beaulieu, Le Bény-Bocage (the seat), Bures-les-Monts, Campeaux, Carville, Étouvy, La Ferrière-Harang, La Graverie, Malloué, Montamy, Mont-Bertrand, Montchauvet, Le Reculey, Saint-Denis-Maisoncelles, Sainte-Marie-Laumont, Saint-Martin-des-Besaces, Saint-Martin-Don, Saint-Ouen-des-Besaces, Saint-Pierre-Tarentaine and Le Tourneur.

== Geography ==
The commune is made up of the following collection of villages and hamlets, Saint-Ouen-des-Besaces, Saint-Martin-des-Besaces, La Mancellière, La Ferrière-Harang, Le Tourneur, Montamy, Mont-Bertrand, Vory, Arclais, Campeaux, Bures-les-Monts, Malloué, Montchauvet, Le Hamel Auvray, Souleuvre en Bocage, Le Hamel Pin, La Ferronnière, Carville, Sourdeval, Saint-Martin-Don, Sainte-Marie-Laumont, Beaulieu, Le Reculey, Le Brun and La Graverie.

The Vire River and one of its tributaries the Souleuvre flow through the commune.

The Commune along with another nine communes shares part of a 5,729 hectare, Natura 2000 conservation area, called the Bassin de la Druance. The commune also has another Natura 2000 conservation area, Bassin de la Souleuvre, a 2,232 hectare area which is shared with three other communes, Valdallière, Dialan sur Chaîne and Brémoy.

The commune is on the border of the area known as Suisse Normande.

== Points of Interest ==
- Souleuvre Viaduct - Originally built by Gustave Eiffel in 1893. The site is now an amusement park, featuring Bungee jumps, a botanical garden and other attractions.

=== Museums ===
- Musée de la Percée du Bocage - Also known as the Bocage Breakthrough Museum is a museum dedicated to Operation Bluecoat, part of Operation Overlord. It first opened in 1983 and moved to its current location in 1994 as part of the 50th Anniversary celebrations of the area being liberated.

=== National heritage sites ===
The Commune has 6 buildings and areas listed as a Monument historique.

- Église Notre-Dame de La Graverie a thirteenth century church listed as a monument in 1928.
- Alignment of nine menhirs from La Plumaudière a Neolithic monument of nine menhirs that was listed as a monument in 1976.
- Wayside cross a seventeenth century Cross located between Pleines-Oeuvres and Campeaux, which was listed as a monument in 1970.
- Cemetery cross an eighteenth century cross located in Malloué, and listed as a monument in 1970.
- Église Notre-Dame de Sainte-Marie-Laumont a twelfth century church listed as a monument in 1928.
- Église Notre-Dame de Malloué an eighteenth century church listed as a monument in 1970.

== Population ==
Population data refer to the commune in its geography as of January 2025.

Historical population
Year	Pop.	±% p.a.
1968	7,396	—
1975	6,763	−1.27%
1982	6,763	+0.00%
1990	7,030	+0.49%
1999	7,488	+0.70%
2007	8,069	+0.94%
2012	8,593	+1.27%
2017	8,839	+0.57%
2023	8,629	−0.40%
Source: INSEE

== Notable people ==
- William Malbank, 1st Baron of Wich Malbank - (c.1050 – before 1109) was lord of Le Bény-Bocage.
- William Malbank, 3rd Baron of Wich Malbank - (c. 1125 – 1176) was lord of Le Bény-Bocage.
- Gilbert de Lacy - (Died after 1163) was lord of Lassy & Campeaux.
- Gaston Jean Baptiste de Renty - (1611 - 1649) was an aristocrat and philanthropist who was born here.
- Didier-François d'Arclais de Montamy - (1702 - 1765) was a civil servant, nature scholar and encyclopédiste who was born here.
- Brigitte Le Brethon (born 1953) is a politician, and a member of The Republicans was born here.

== Twin towns – sister cities ==
Souleuvre en Bocage is twinned with:

- Slaugham, England, United Kingdom since 1974
- Krzywiń, Poland since 1997

== See also ==
- Communes of the Calvados department
