= Bures-les-Monts =

- Part of Souleuvre-en-Bocage
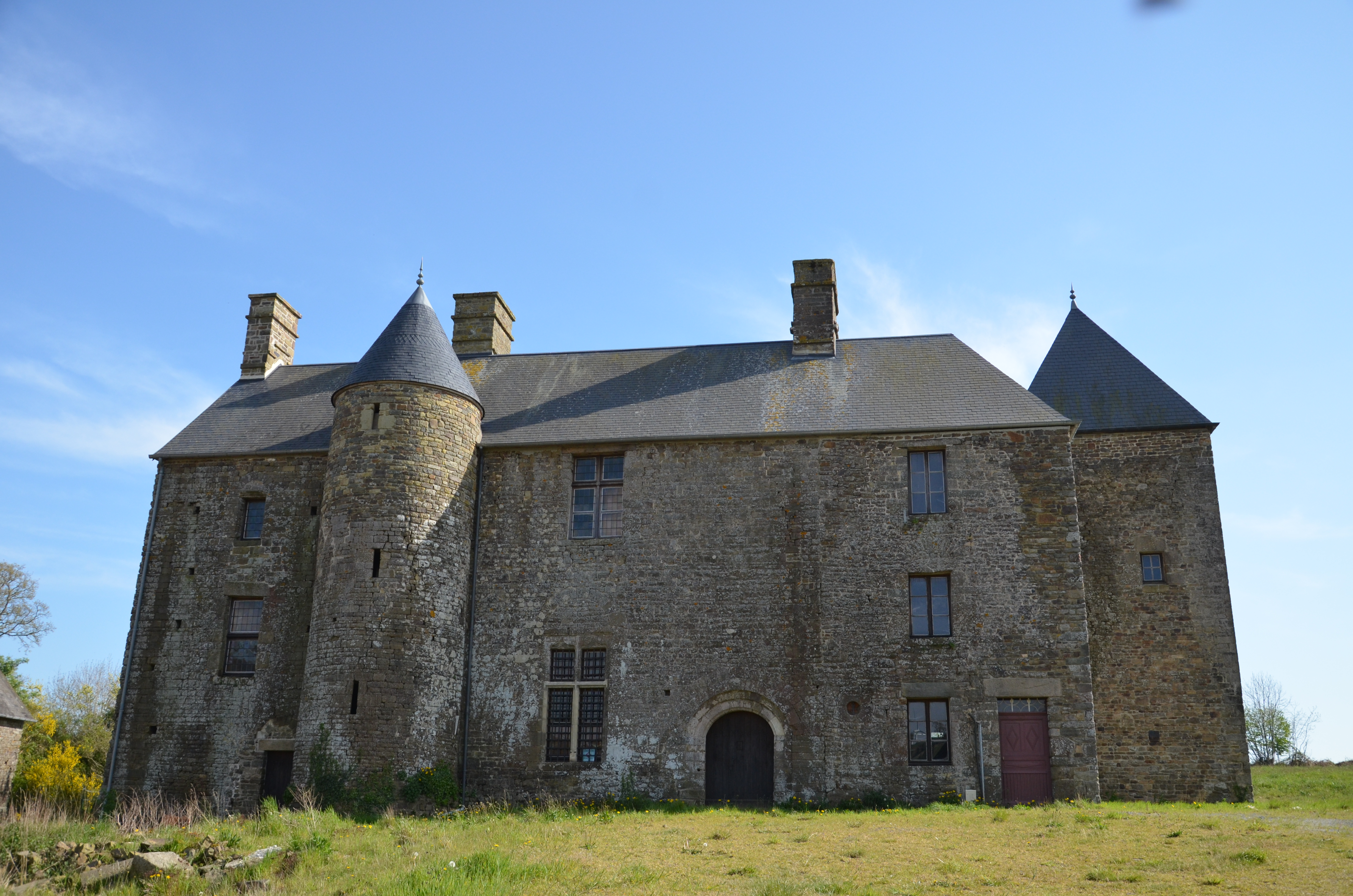
- Medieval castle
- Location of Bures-les-Monts
- Location within France Location within Normandy
- Coordinates: 48°56′50″N 0°57′50″W
- Country: France
- Region: Normandy
- Department: Calvados
- Arrondissement: Vire
- Canton: Condé-en-Normandie
- Commune: Souleuvre-en-Bocage
- Area^{1}: 5.21 km^{2} (2.01 sq mi)
- Elevation: 10 m (33 ft)
- Highest elevation: 257 m (843 ft)
- Lowest elevation: 54 m (177 ft)
- Population (2023): 137
  - Density: 26.3/km^{2} (68.1/sq mi)
- Time zone: UTC+01:00 (CET)
  - Summer (DST): UTC+02:00 (CEST)
- Postal code: 14350
- ^{1} French Land Register data, which excludes lakes, ponds, glaciers > 1 km^{2} (0.386 sq mi or 247 acres) and river estuaries.

Bures-les-Monts (French pronunciation: [byʁ le mɔ̃]) is a former commune in the Calvados department in the Normandy region in northwestern France. On 1 January 2016, it was merged into the new commune of Souleuvre-en-Bocage.

== See also ==
- Communes of the Calvados department
