= Montchauvet =

Montchauvet is the name of several communes in France:

- Montchauvet, Calvados
- Montchauvet, Yvelines
- Montchauvet (mountain)
