= Saint-Ouen-des-Besaces =

- Part of Souleuvre-en-Bocage
- Location of Saint-Ouen-des-Besaces
- Location within France Location within Normandy
- Coordinates: 49°01′24″N 0°50′48″W
- Country: France
- Region: Normandy
- Department: Calvados
- Arrondissement: Vire
- Canton: Condé-en-Normandie
- Commune: Souleuvre-en-Bocage
- Area^{1}: 8.48 km^{2} (3.27 sq mi)
- Elevation: 148 m (486 ft)
- Highest elevation: 301 m (988 ft)
- Lowest elevation: 120 m (390 ft)
- Population (2023): 430
  - Density: 51/km^{2} (130/sq mi)
- Time zone: UTC+01:00 (CET)
  - Summer (DST): UTC+02:00 (CEST)
- Postal code: 14350
- ^{1} French Land Register data, which excludes lakes, ponds, glaciers > 1 km^{2} (0.386 sq mi or 247 acres) and river estuaries.

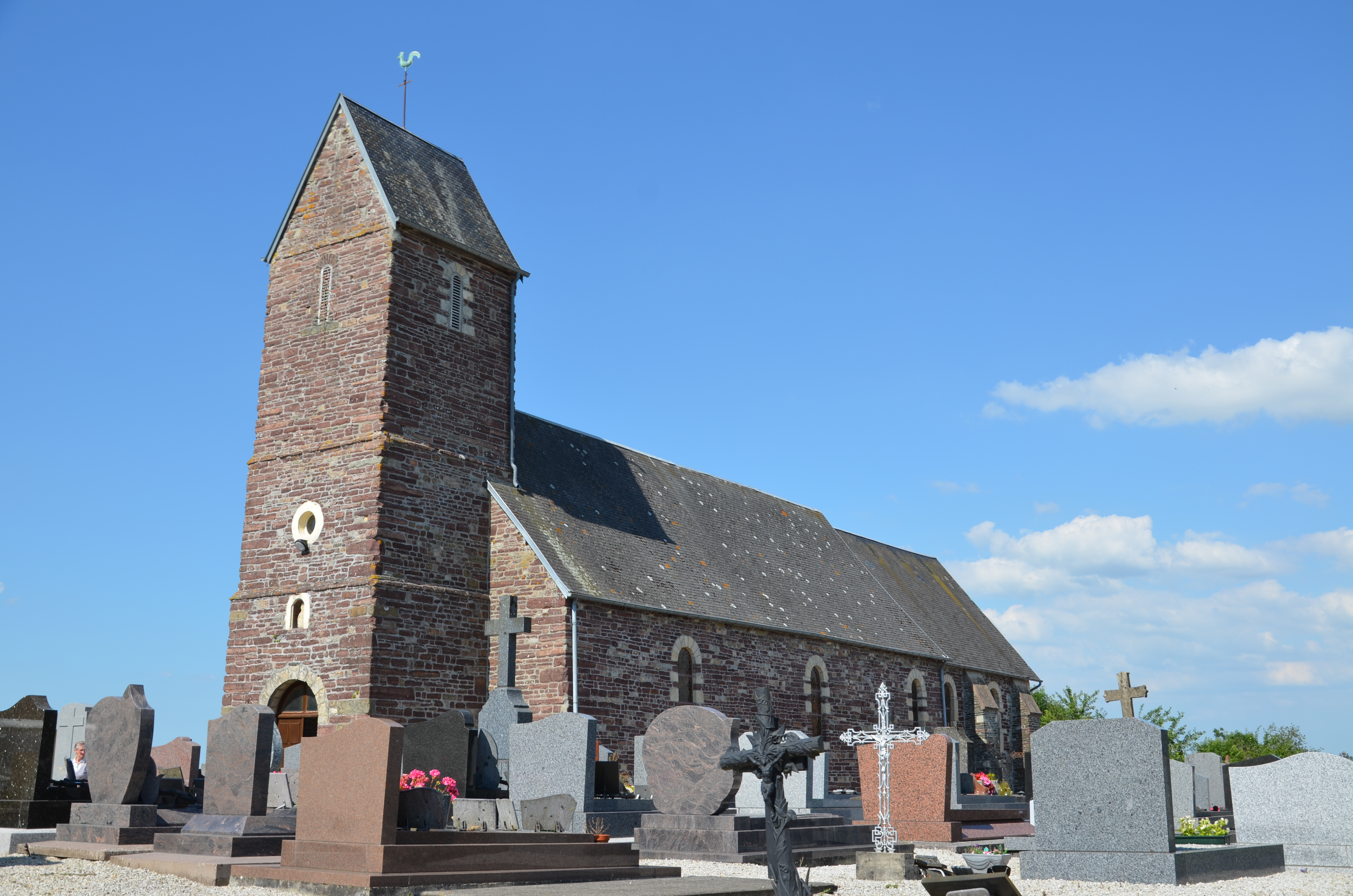
Saint-Ouen-des-Besaces

Saint-Ouen-des-Besaces (French pronunciation: [sɛ̃.t‿wɛ̃ de bəzas]) is a former commune in the Calvados department in the Normandy region in northwestern France. On 1 January 2016, it was merged into the new commune of Souleuvre-en-Bocage.

== See also ==
- Communes of the Calvados department
