= La Graverie =

- Part of Souleuvre-en-Bocage
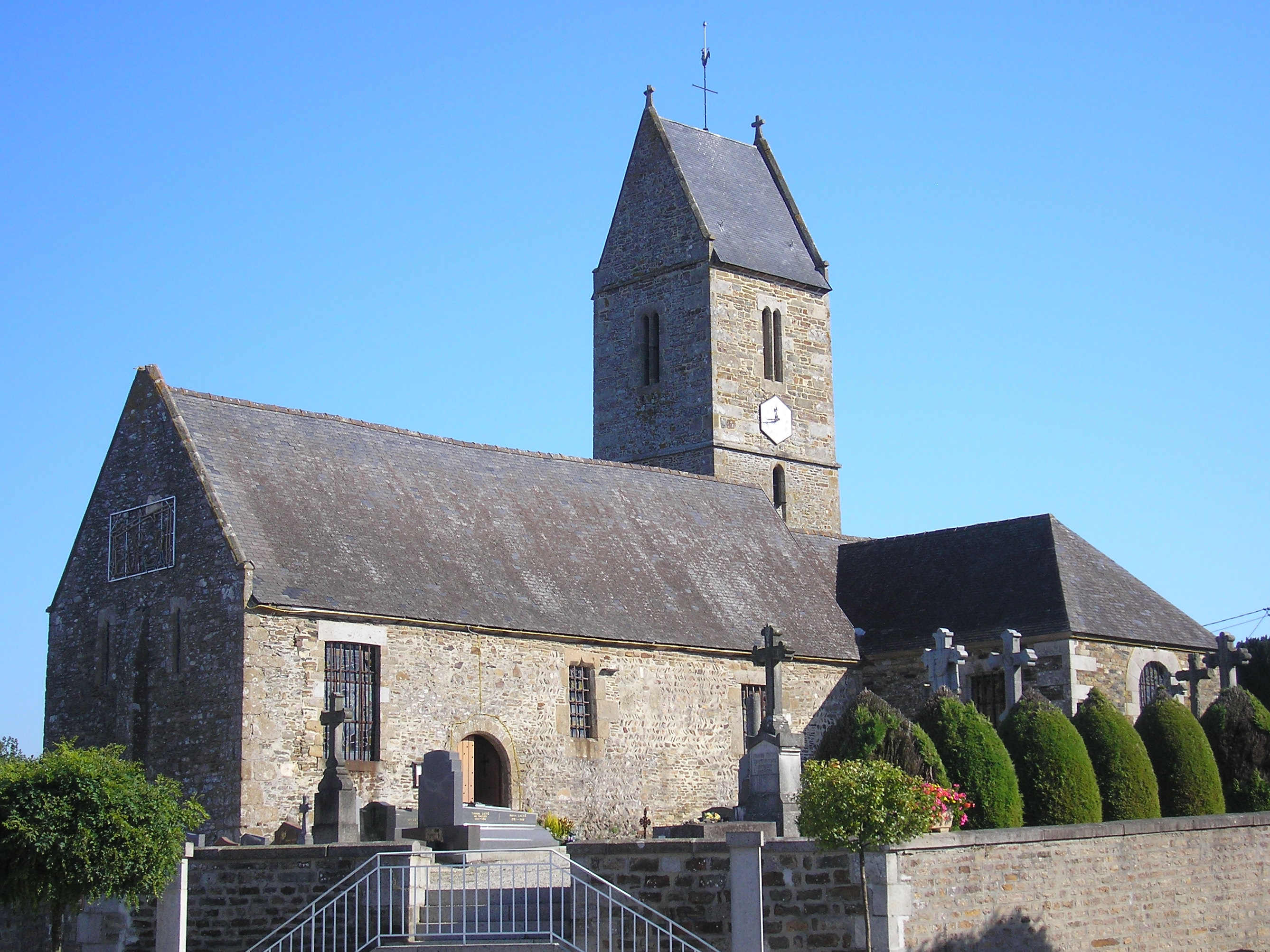
- Location of La Graverie
- Location within France Location within Normandy
- Coordinates: 48°53′42″N 0°52′46″W
- Country: France
- Region: Normandy
- Department: Calvados
- Arrondissement: Vire
- Canton: Condé-en-Normandie
- Commune: Souleuvre-en-Bocage
- Area^{1}: 11.89 km^{2} (4.59 sq mi)
- Elevation: 89 m (292 ft)
- Highest elevation: 165 m (541 ft)
- Lowest elevation: 79 m (259 ft)
- Population (2022): 1,179
  - Density: 99.16/km^{2} (256.8/sq mi)
- Time zone: UTC+01:00 (CET)
  - Summer (DST): UTC+02:00 (CEST)
- Postal code: 14350
- ^{1} French Land Register data, which excludes lakes, ponds, glaciers > 1 km^{2} (0.386 sq mi or 247 acres) and river estuaries.

La Graverie (French pronunciation: [la ɡʁavʁi]) is a former commune in the Calvados department in the Normandy region in northwestern France. On 1 January 2016, it was merged into the new commune of Souleuvre-en-Bocage.

== Population ==
Historical population

Year	Pop.	±% p.a.
1793	883	—
1821	965	+0.32%
1846	956	−0.04%
1872	793	−0.72%
1901	692	−0.47%
1926	644	−0.29%
1946	583	−0.50%
1962	617	+0.35%

Year	Pop.	±% p.a.
1968	626	+0.24%
1975	674	+1.06%
1982	874	+3.78%
1990	1,038	+2.17%
1999	1,122	+0.87%
2006	1,122	+0.00%
2022	1,179	+0.31%

Source: EHESS and INSEE

== See also ==
- Communes of the Calvados department
