= Sainte-Marie-Laumont =

- Part of Souleuvre-en-Bocage
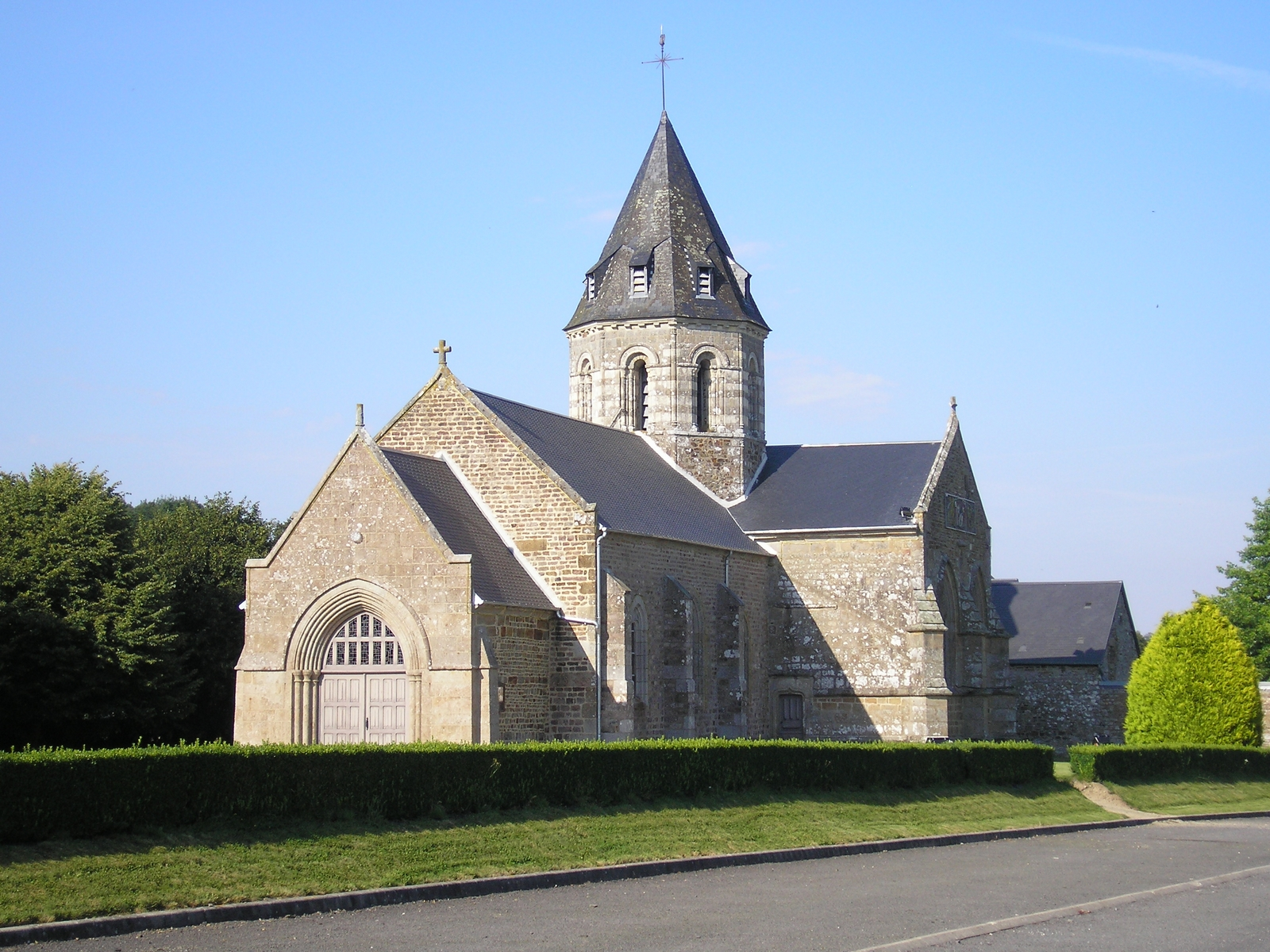
- Location of Sainte-Marie-Laumont
- Location within France Location within Normandy
- Coordinates: 48°55′20″N 0°53′58″W
- Country: France
- Region: Normandy
- Department: Calvados
- Arrondissement: Vire
- Canton: Condé-en-Normandie
- Commune: Souleuvre-en-Bocage
- Area^{1}: 15.61 km^{2} (6.03 sq mi)
- Elevation: 120 m (390 ft)
- Highest elevation: 201 m (659 ft)
- Lowest elevation: 67 m (220 ft)
- Population (2023): 662
  - Density: 42.4/km^{2} (110/sq mi)
- Time zone: UTC+01:00 (CET)
  - Summer (DST): UTC+02:00 (CEST)
- Postal code: 14350
- ^{1} French Land Register data, which excludes lakes, ponds, glaciers > 1 km^{2} (0.386 sq mi or 247 acres) and river estuaries.

Sainte-Marie-Laumont (French pronunciation: [sɛ̃t maʁi lomɔ̃]) is a former commune in the Calvados department in the Normandy region in northwestern France. On 1 January 2016, it was merged into the new commune of Souleuvre-en-Bocage.

== See also ==
- Communes of the Calvados department
