= La Ferrière-Harang =

- Part of Souleuvre-en-Bocage
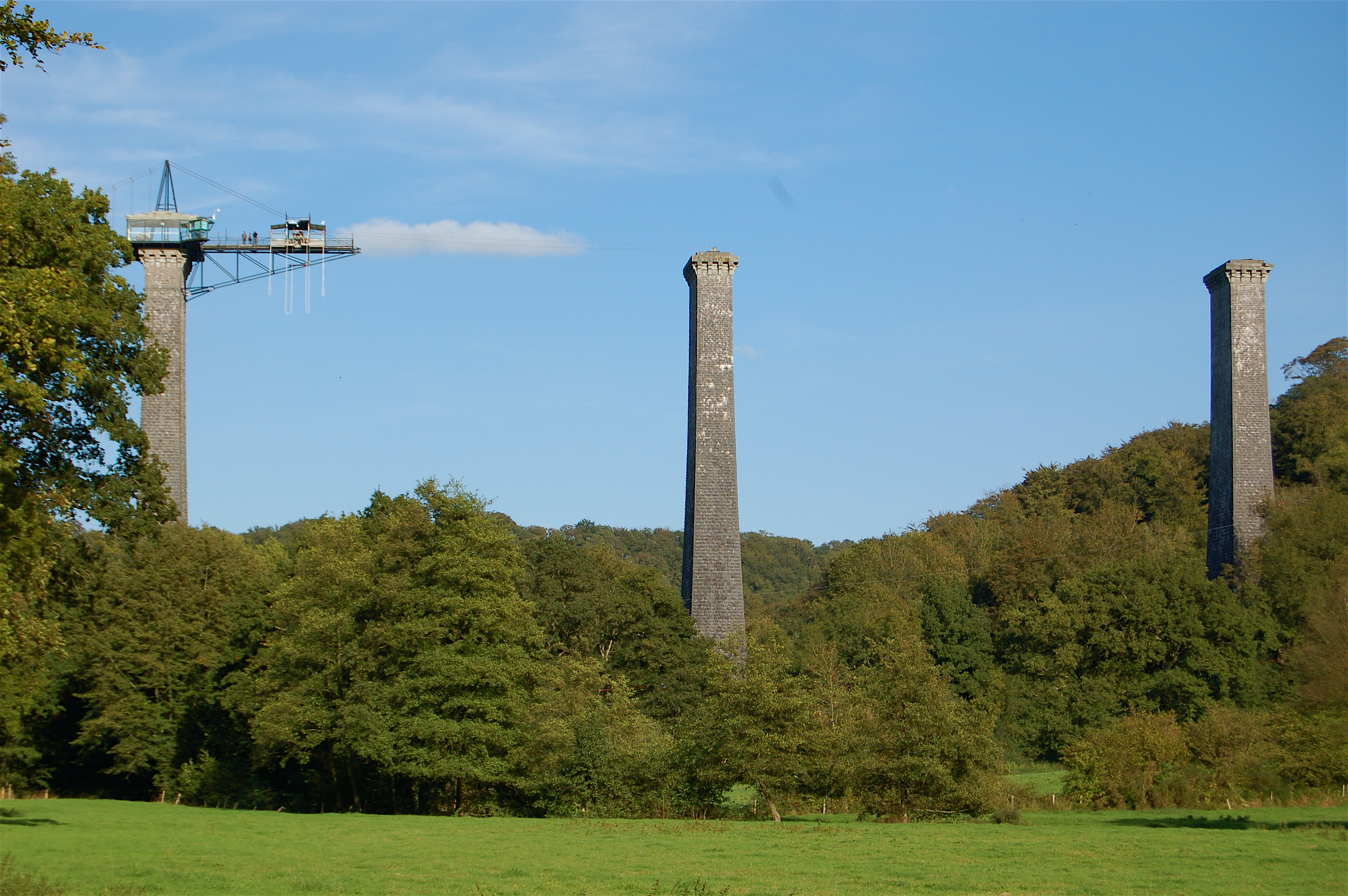
- Remains of the Souleuvre viaduct
- Location of La Ferrière-Harang
- Location within France Location within Normandy
- Coordinates: 48°58′33″N 0°53′23″W
- Country: France
- Region: Normandy
- Department: Calvados
- Arrondissement: Vire
- Canton: Condé-en-Normandie
- Commune: Souleuvre-en-Bocage
- Area^{1}: 11.43 km^{2} (4.41 sq mi)
- Elevation: 179 m (587 ft)
- Highest elevation: 243 m (797 ft)
- Lowest elevation: 75 m (246 ft)
- Population (2023): 313
  - Density: 27.4/km^{2} (70.9/sq mi)
- Time zone: UTC+01:00 (CET)
  - Summer (DST): UTC+02:00 (CEST)
- Postal code: 14350
- ^{1} French Land Register data, which excludes lakes, ponds, glaciers > 1 km^{2} (0.386 sq mi or 247 acres) and river estuaries.

La Ferrière-Harang (French pronunciation: [la fɛʁjɛʁ aʁɑ̃]) is a former commune in the Calvados department in the Normandy region in northwestern France. On 1 January 2016, it was merged into the new commune of Souleuvre-en-Bocage.

== Points of Interest ==
- Souleuvre Viaduct - Originally built by Gustave Eiffel in 1893, the vidauct was demolished in 1970, leaving only the pillars. The site is now an amusement park, featuring Bungee jumps, a botanical garden and other attractions.

== See also ==
- Communes of the Calvados department
