= Brémoy =

- Commune
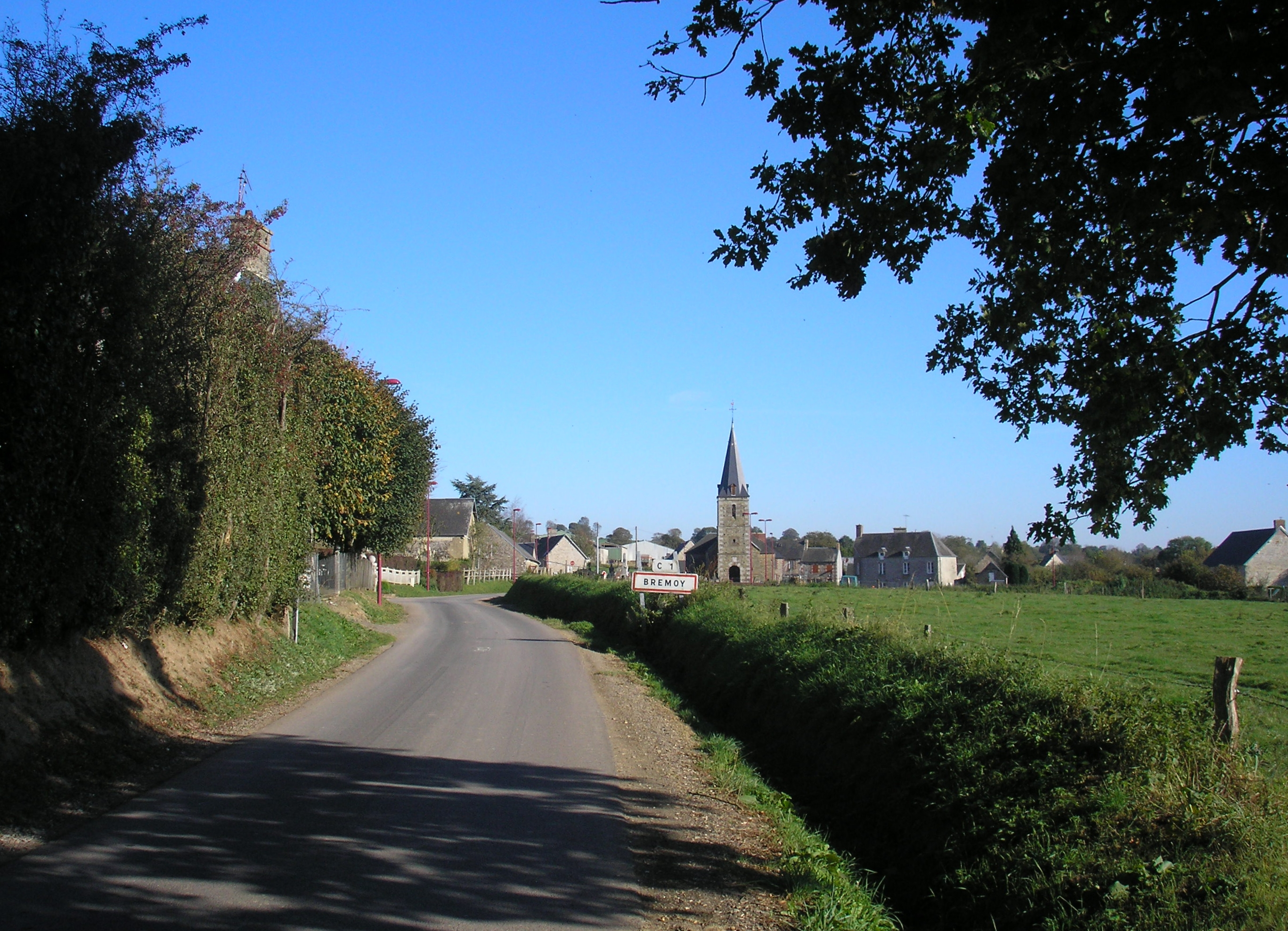
- The road into Brémoy
- Location of Brémoy
- Location within France Location within Normandy
- Coordinates: 48°59′27″N 0°46′44″W
- Country: France
- Region: Normandy
- Department: Calvados
- Arrondissement: Vire
- Canton: Les Monts d'Aunay
- Intercommunality: Pré-Bocage Intercom

Government
  - Mayor (2020–2026): Alain Legentil
- Area^{1}: 12.5 km^{2} (4.8 sq mi)
- Elevation: 362 m (1,188 ft)
- Highest elevation: 358 m (1,175 ft)
- Lowest elevation: 158 m (518 ft)
- Population (2023): 262
  - Density: 21.0/km^{2} (54.3/sq mi)
- Time zone: UTC+01:00 (CET)
  - Summer (DST): UTC+02:00 (CEST)
- INSEE/Postal code: 14096 /14260
- ^{1} French Land Register data, which excludes lakes, ponds, glaciers > 1 km^{2} (0.386 sq mi or 247 acres) and river estuaries.

Brémoy (French pronunciation: [bʁemwa]) is a commune in the Calvados department in the Normandy region in northwestern France.

== Geography ==
The commune is made up of the following collection of villages and hamlets, La Rebourserie, La Cabosse, La Tromperie, Le Feugré, Le Carrefour des Fossés, Les Maisons, Beaumont, La Varablière and La Vatelière.

The commune has a Natura 2000 conservation area, Bassin de la Souleuvre, a 2,232 hectare area which is shared with three other communes, Valdallière, Souleuvre en Bocage and Souleuvre en Bocage.

== Population ==
Historical population
Year	Pop.	±% p.a.
1968	209	—
1975	194	−1.06%
1982	183	−0.83%
1990	181	−0.14%
1999	226	+2.50%
2007	214	−0.68%
2012	215	+0.09%
2017	227	+1.09%
2023	262	+2.42%
Source: INSEE

== See also ==
- Communes of the Calvados department
