= Carville, Calvados =

Carville
- Part of Souleuvre-en-Bocage
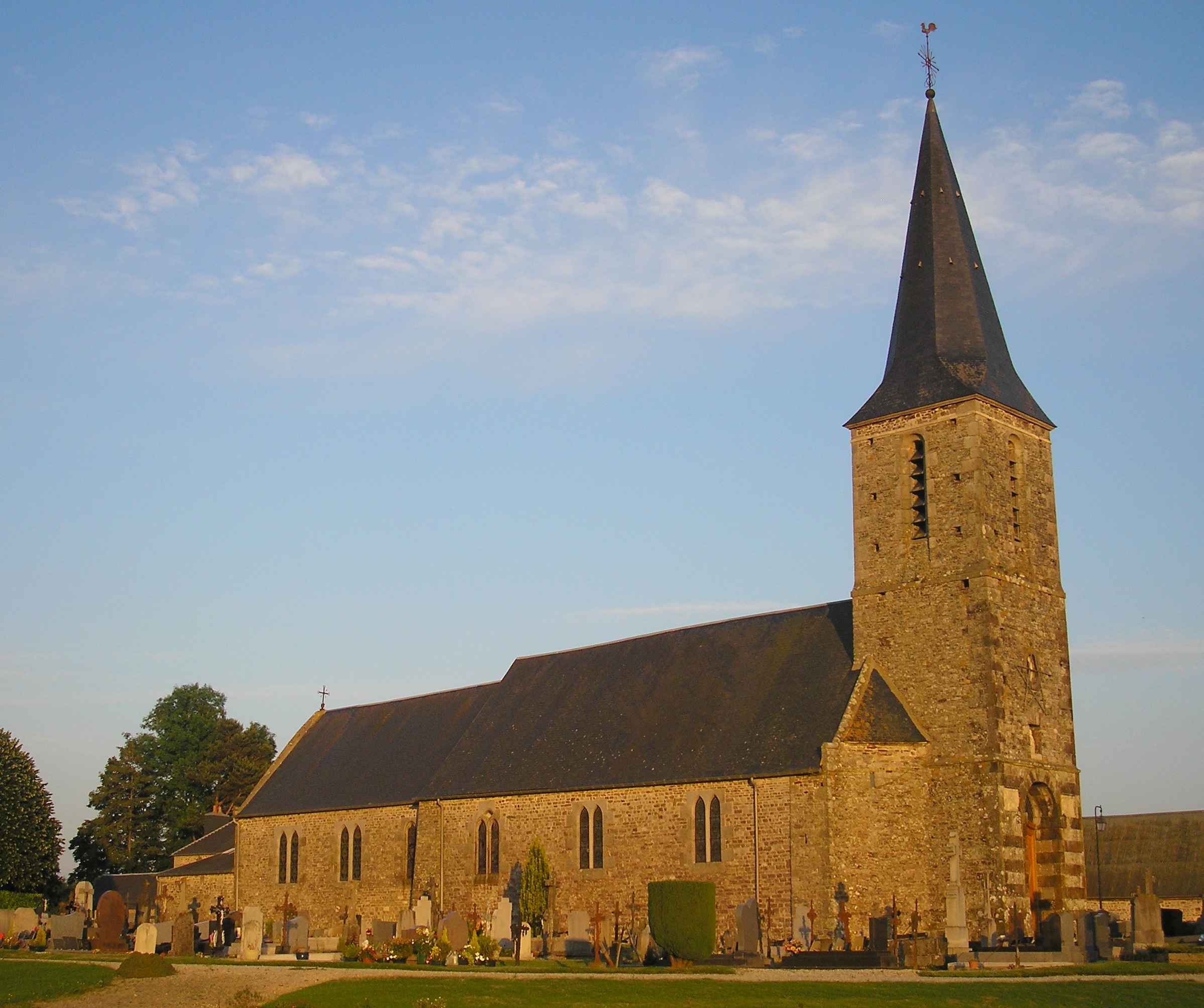
- Location of Carville
- Location within France Location within Normandy
- Coordinates: 48°55′50″N 0°51′28″W
- Country: France
- Region: Normandy
- Department: Calvados
- Arrondissement: Vire
- Canton: Condé-en-Normandie
- Commune: Souleuvre-en-Bocage
- Area^{1}: 10.43 km^{2} (4.03 sq mi)
- Elevation: 153 m (502 ft)
- Highest elevation: 206 m (676 ft)
- Lowest elevation: 73 m (240 ft)
- Population (2023): 331
  - Density: 31.7/km^{2} (82.2/sq mi)
- Time zone: UTC+01:00 (CET)
  - Summer (DST): UTC+02:00 (CEST)
- Postal code: 14350
- ^{1} French Land Register data, which excludes lakes, ponds, glaciers > 1 km^{2} (0.386 sq mi or 247 acres) and river estuaries.

Carville (French pronunciation: [kaʁvil]) is a former commune in the Calvados department in the Normandy region in northwestern France. On 1 January 2016, it was merged into the new commune of Souleuvre-en-Bocage.

== See also ==
- Communes of the Calvados department
