= Saint-Pierre-Tarentaine =

- Part of Souleuvre-en-Bocage
- Location of Saint-Pierre-Tarentaine
- Location within France Location within Normandy
- Coordinates: 48°57′54″N 0°47′33″W
- Country: France
- Region: Normandy
- Department: Calvados
- Arrondissement: Vire
- Canton: Condé-en-Normandie
- Commune: Souleuvre-en-Bocage
- Area^{1}: 12.23 km^{2} (4.72 sq mi)
- Elevation: 216 m (709 ft)
- Highest elevation: 260 m (850 ft)
- Lowest elevation: 125 m (410 ft)
- Population (2023): 354
  - Density: 28.9/km^{2} (75.0/sq mi)
- Time zone: UTC+01:00 (CET)
  - Summer (DST): UTC+02:00 (CEST)
- Postal code: 14350
- ^{1} French Land Register data, which excludes lakes, ponds, glaciers > 1 km^{2} (0.386 sq mi or 247 acres) and river estuaries.

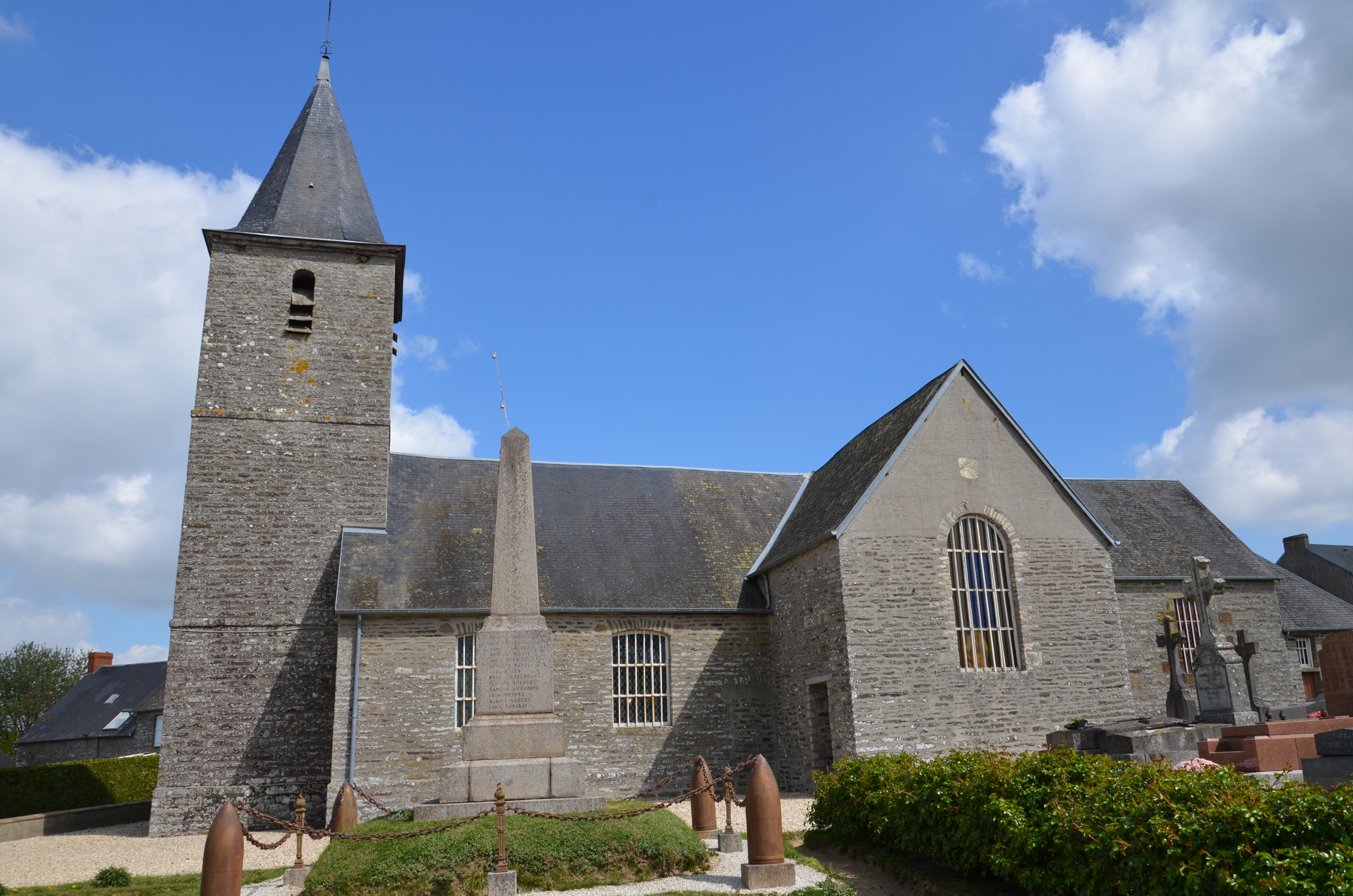
Saint-Pierre-Tarentaine

Saint-Pierre-Tarentaine (French pronunciation: [sɛ̃ pjɛʁ taʁɑ̃tɛn]) is a former commune in the Calvados department in the Normandy region in northwestern France. On 1 January 2016, it was merged into the new commune of Souleuvre-en-Bocage.

== See also ==
- Communes of the Calvados department
