= Campeaux, Calvados =

Campeaux
- Part of Souleuvre-en-Bocage
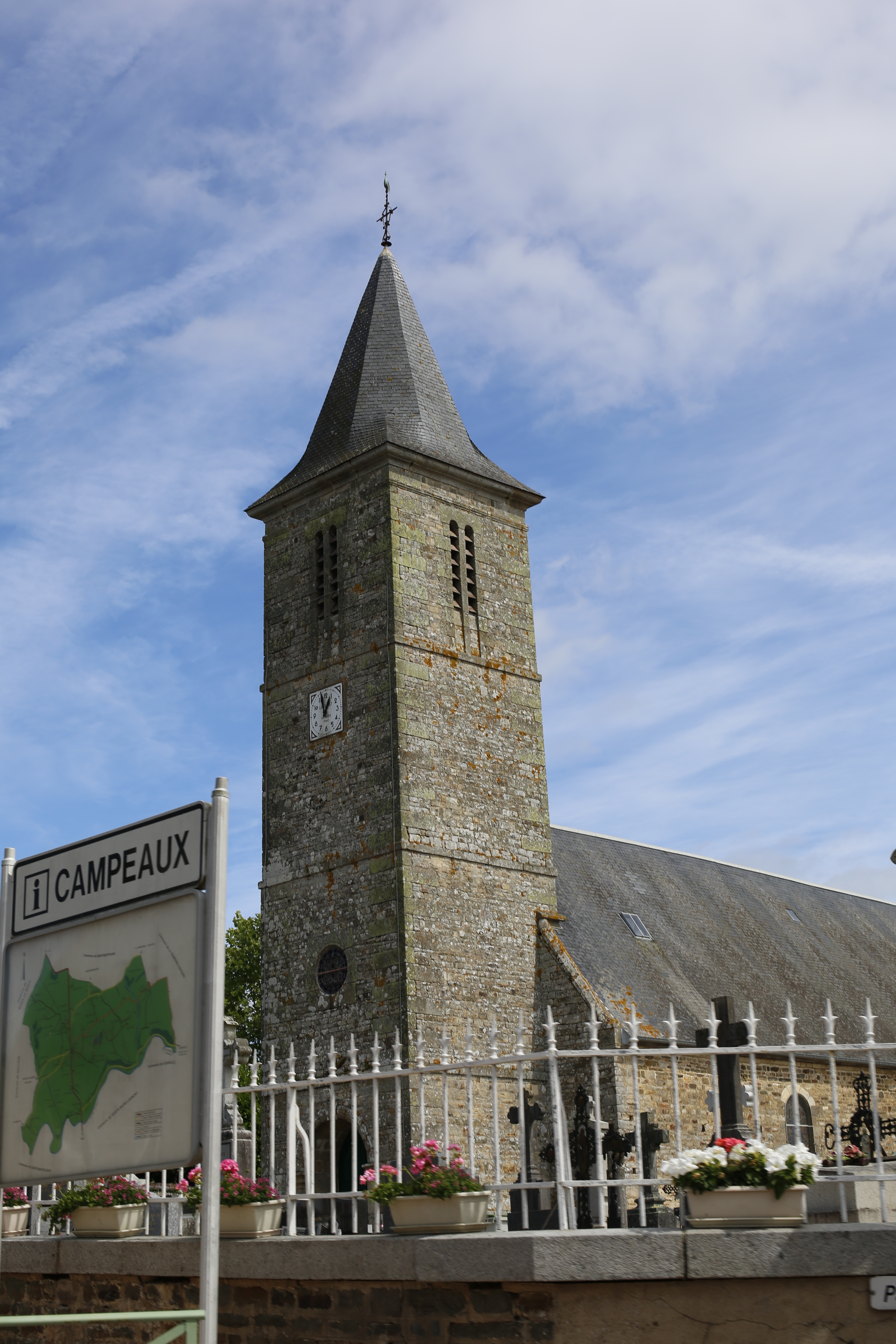
- Saint-Martin Church in Campeaux
- Location of Campeaux
- Location within France Location within Normandy
- Coordinates: 48°57′05″N 0°55′48″W
- Country: France
- Region: Normandy
- Department: Calvados
- Arrondissement: Vire
- Canton: Condé-en-Normandie
- Commune: Souleuvre-en-Bocage
- Area^{1}: 8.43 km^{2} (3.25 sq mi)
- Elevation: 178 m (584 ft)
- Highest elevation: 252 m (827 ft)
- Lowest elevation: 64 m (210 ft)
- Population (2023): 632
  - Density: 75.0/km^{2} (194/sq mi)
- Time zone: UTC+01:00 (CET)
  - Summer (DST): UTC+02:00 (CEST)
- Postal code: 14350
- ^{1} French Land Register data, which excludes lakes, ponds, glaciers > 1 km^{2} (0.386 sq mi or 247 acres) and river estuaries.

Campeaux (French pronunciation: [kɑ̃po]) is a former commune in the Calvados department in the Normandy region, northwestern France. On 1 January 2016, it was merged into the new commune of Souleuvre-en-Bocage.

== See also ==
- Communes of the Calvados department
- Campau family
