= Montchauvet, Calvados =

Montchauvet
- Part of Souleuvre-en-Bocage
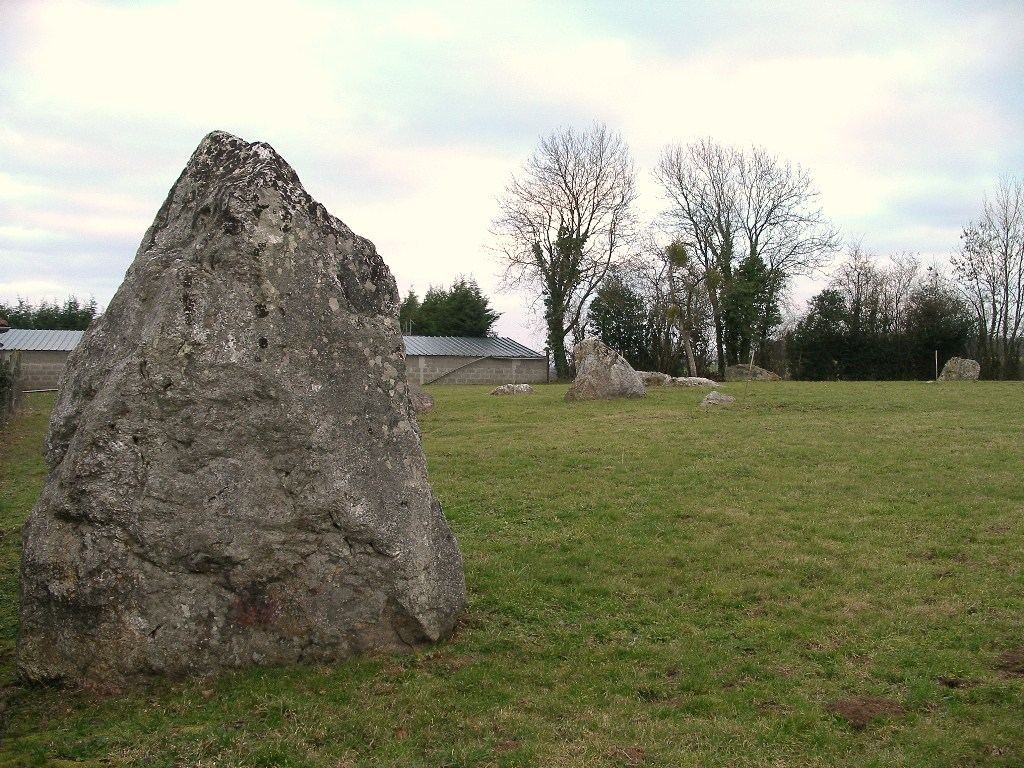
- Menhirs of Plumaudière
- Location of Montchauvet
- Location within France Location within Normandy
- Coordinates: 48°56′38″N 0°44′15″W
- Country: France
- Region: Normandy
- Department: Calvados
- Arrondissement: Vire
- Canton: Condé-en-Normandie
- Commune: Souleuvre-en-Bocage
- Area^{1}: 18.21 km^{2} (7.03 sq mi)
- Highest elevation: 293 m (961 ft)
- Lowest elevation: 145 m (476 ft)
- Population (2023): 368
  - Density: 20.2/km^{2} (52.3/sq mi)
- Time zone: UTC+01:00 (CET)
  - Summer (DST): UTC+02:00 (CEST)
- Postal code: 14350
- ^{1} French Land Register data, which excludes lakes, ponds, glaciers > 1 km^{2} (0.386 sq mi or 247 acres) and river estuaries.

Montchauvet (French pronunciation: [mɔ̃ʃovɛ]) is a former commune in the Calvados department in the Normandy region in northwestern France. On 1 January 2016, it was merged into the new commune of Souleuvre-en-Bocage.

== See also ==
- Communes of the Calvados department
