= Gaston Jean Baptiste de Renty =

French aristocrat and philanthropist

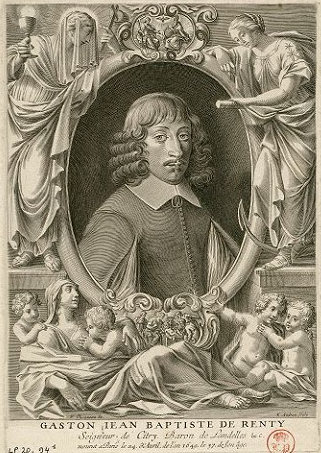
- Gaston Jean Baptiste de Renty
- Born: 1611; Le Bény-Bocage
- Died: Before 24 April 1649 (aged 37–38)
- Education: Collège de Navarre
- Known for: aristocrat and philanthropist

Gaston Jean Baptiste de Renty (born 1611 at the castle of Beni, Diocese of Bayeux in Normandy; died 24 April 1649) was a French aristocrat and philanthropist. He ruled the Company of the Blessed Sacrament between 1639 and 1649, and was under the influence of the French Oratorians, through his confessor Paul de Condren.

== Life ==
The only son of Charles, Baron de Renty, and Elisabeth de Pastoureau, Gaston studied at the Collège de Navarre in Paris, with the Jesuits at Caen, and finished at the age of seventeen at the College of the Nobles in Paris. He wrote several treatises on mathematics, in which he excelled.

The reading of the Imitation of Christ aroused the desire to become a Carthusian, but obeying the wish of his parents, he married. In 1638 he abandoned public life and devoted himself to the service of the needy and suffering. Struck by the ignorance, in religious matters, of travellers at the Hospital of St. Gervaise in Paris, he gave them catechetical instructions and induced others to do likewise. In the course of his charitable works he made the acquaintance of Henry Michael Buch (b. 1590 in the Duchy of Luxembourg; d. 9 June 1666 at Paris; also known as "Good Henry") and induced him to found a congregation of shoemakers and tailors, Frères Cordonniers. They worked at their trade, divided their earnings with the poor and performed special acts of devotion prescribed by the pastor of St. Paul's.

The statutes were approved by the Archbishop of Paris, Jean Francis de Gondi. After his death, Renty's body was brought to Citri in the Diocese of Soissons. When the coffin was opened nine years later his body was found intact. The bishop ordered it placed in a marble tomb behind the high altar. Throughout his career at court, in the army, and in politics he merited the esteem of all, and took an active part in public good works.
