= Canton of Condé-en-Normandie =

Coordinates: 48.85°N 0.55°W

- Canton
- Situation of the canton of Condé-en-Normandie in the department of Calvados
- Country: France
- Region: Normandy
- Department: Calvados
- No. of communes: {{{nbcomm}}}
- Population (2023): 22,638
- INSEE code: 1410

The canton of Condé-en-Normandie (before 2021: Condé-sur-Noireau) is an administrative division of the Calvados department, northwestern France. Its borders were modified during the French canton reorganisation which came into effect in March 2015. Its seat is in Condé-en-Normandie.

It consists of the following communes:

1. Condé-en-Normandie
2. Les Monts d'Aunay (partly)
3. Périgny
4. Pontécoulant
5. Saint-Denis-de-Méré
6. Souleuvre en Bocage
7. Terres de Druance
8. Valdallière
9. La Villette
