= Johann Juncker =

German physician and chemist (1679–1759)

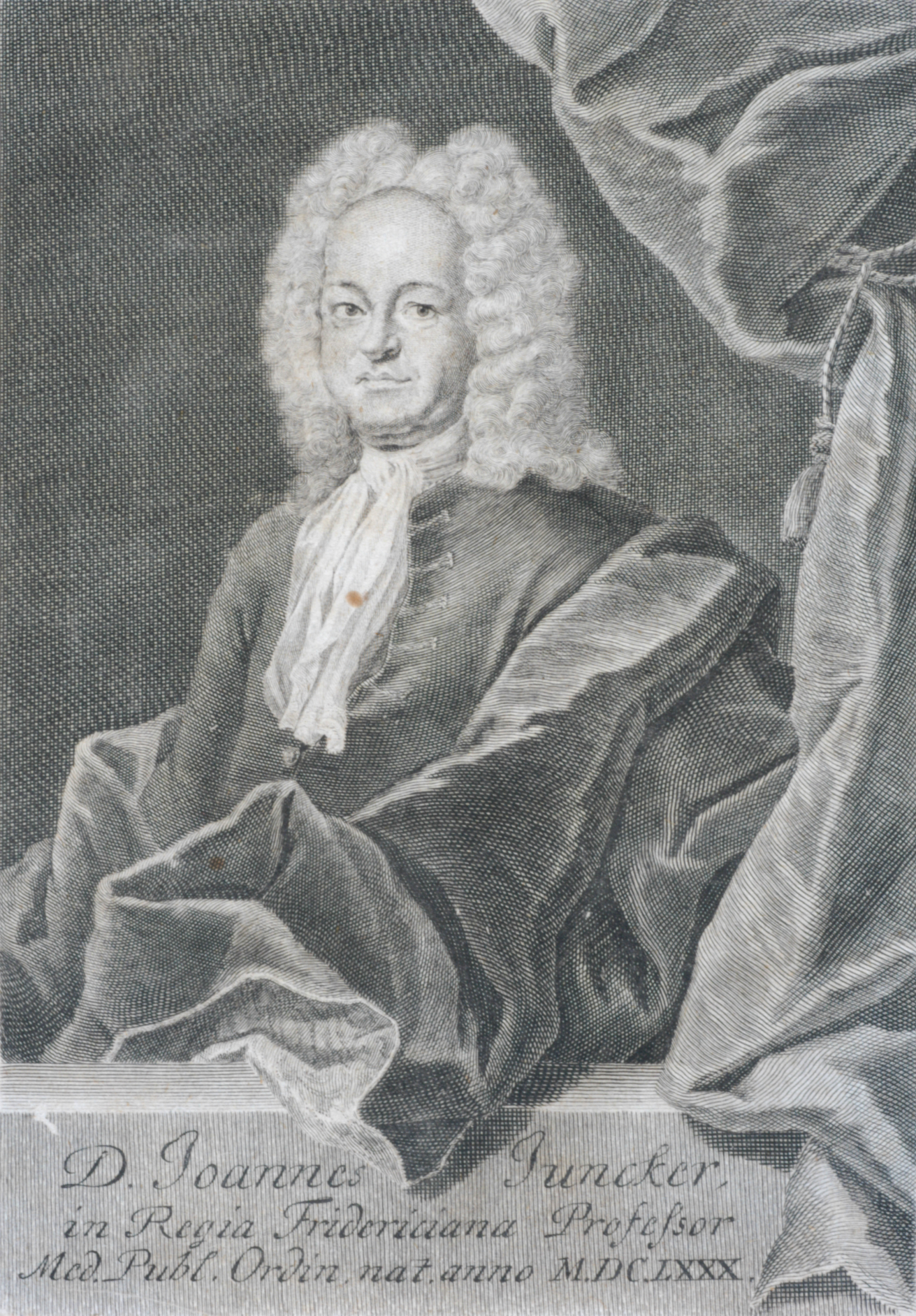
- D. Joannes Juncker
- Born: 23 December 1679; Londorf, Hesse
- Died: 25 October 1759 (aged 79); Halle (Saale)
- Education: University of Marburg, University of Halle
- Scientific career
- Fields: Chemistry
- Workplaces: University of Halle

Johann Juncker (23 December 1679 in Londorf, Hesse – 25 October 1759 in Halle, Kingdom of Prussia) was a German physician and chemist. Juncker was a leader in the Pietist reform movement as it applied to medicine. He directed the Francke Foundations and initiated approaches to medical practice, charitable treatment, and education at the University of Halle that influenced others internationally. He was a staunch proponent of Georg Ernst Stahl and helped to more clearly present Stahl's phlogiston theory of combustion.

== Early life and education ==
Johann Juncker was born on 23 December 1679 to Johann Ludwig Juncker, a well-to-do tenant farmer in Londorf, near Giessen. Juncker went to school in Allendorf and Obernhof, before attending the Pädagogium in Giessen for four years. The head of the institution at that time, J. H. May, was a Pietist. A dissident evangelical reform movement, Pietism emphasized the practical application of theology and active charitable work.

Juncker attended the University of Marburg, matriculating on 30 October 1696 with a degree in philosophy. His studies were briefly interrupted when he helped his parents relocate to Franconia in 1696, due to hostilities of the Nine Years' War.

As of 2 November 1697, Juncker moved to the newly founded University of Halle (or Fridericiana), a center of Pietist theological reform where he began studying theology. Philosophical lectures were given by Christoph Cellarius and theological lectures by August Hermann Francke. Juncker also took classes in medicine with Friedrich Hoffmann and Georg Ernst Stahl while at Halle. Juncker received free meals and lodging as part of an initiative, backed by a royal order, that collected funds for the support of students. Like many of the poorer students, Juncker taught in the Pädagogium at Halle.

== Career ==
From 1701 to 1707 Juncker held a sequence of teaching positions, in Halle, Lemgo, Schaaken and Pyrmont. In 1707 he married Charlotte Sophie the Countess of Waldeck and Pyrmont (1667-1723). They lived in Schwarzenau, where he continued to study medicine.

In 1716 Juncker returned to Halle at the request of Francke, to become medical supervisor of the school, orphanage and clinic that Francke had founded. The institutions were collectively known as the Franckesche Stiftungen or Francke Foundations. Juncker completed his medical studies under Michael Alberti and graduated on 27 January 1717 with a doctor of medicine.

The Francke Foundations were shaped by the Pietist movement. As a pedagogical center, the institutions at Halle influenced educational systems both in Germany and internationally. Juncker was a leader of Pietist medicine, influential in establishing approaches to medical practice, charitable treatment, and education at Halle. Poor patients received both medical treatment and medicines for free. Charity patients and those able to pay received medicines of equal quality. Juncker supervised the laboratories where medicines were produced. They were exported to countries as far away as India and South Africa, and provided the institution with an important source of income.

As director of the orphanage and its associated medical clinic, Juncker made the practice of volunteering at the clinic (previously an option for medical students) required as part of the medical curriculum. The addition of this Collegium clinicum or practical training to the curriculum led to the expansion of both the medical program and the clinic. Under Juncker's direction, the clinic provided free medical care to thousands of poor patients each year. As a result of Juncker's approach, Halle became an "internationally renowned centre of practical training". Juncker's clinic at Halle has been described as "a second influential source of clinical teaching". It was preceded only by Herman Boerhaave's clinic, which was established in 1714, three years earlier. Although other institutions were slow to model themselves on it, Juncker's work at Halle inspired the establishment of clinics at Berlin, Göttingen, Jena, and Erfurt.

Juncker wrote and published extensively. In 1721 he published Conspectus chirurgiae, an alphabetical listing describing surgical and obstetrical instruments, bandages, and other medical equipment such as a vaginal cannula for treatment of uterine prolapse. Between 1721 and 1757, 33 editions of Conspectus chirurgiae were published. It is considered one of his most important works, as is Conspectus formularum medicarum.

Juncker was an energetic defender of the Halle physician Georg Ernst Stahl, who founded the phlogiston theory of combustion. Juncker published dissertations and books that developed Stahl's vitalist approach. His treatment of Stahl's work on chemical composition and reaction was "critical and coherent", making it easier to understand and reaching a greater audience. He also agreed with Stahl that the disciplines of chemistry and medicine should be treated as distinct. Juncker's Conspectus chemiae theoretico-practicae (1730) systematically explored the work of Stahl and Johann Joachim Becher, and influenced the reception of Stahl's work by eighteenth-century European thinkers including Guillaume-François Rouelle and Immanuel Kant.

On 29 June 1729 Juncker was made a full professor with an appointment to the chair of medicine at the University of Halle.

== Family ==
Juncker was married three times. His first marriage was in 1707 to Charlotte Sophie the Countess of Waldeck and Pyrmont (28 January 1667 – 6 September 1723 in Halle), the daughter of Count Christian Ludwig. His second marriage was in 1725 to Johanna Elisabeth Lichtenberg (1703-1726), the daughter of the Johann Philipp Lichtenberg (1660–1739), administrator of Jägersburg. Of this marriage, one daughter, Philippine Louise, survived, marrying the physician Peter Nicolai Neugart in April 1743. Juncker's third marriage was on 17 April 1727 to Christiane Eleonore von Bomsdorf (d. 1765), the daughter of the Saxon Oberst Phillip Wilhelm von Bamsdorff. The son of this marriage was the physician Friedrich Christian Juncker (13 May 1730, Copenhagen - 27 July 1770, Halle) who also became a Halle professor of medicine.

Juncker held the position of professor of medicine at Halle from 29 June 1729 until his death on 25 October 1759. His grave is located in the Halle Stadtgottesacker cemetery complex. He was succeeded in his position as professor of medicine at Halle by his son, Friedrich Christian Juncker.

== Publications ==
Juncker's published works include the following:

- Conspectus medicinae theoretico-practicae : tabulis CXXXVIII omnes primarios morbos methodo Stahliana tractandos, exhibens (39 editions 1718-1744)
- Conspectus chirurgiae : tam medicae, methodo Stahliana conscriptae, quam instrumentalis, recentissimorum auctorum ductu collectae : quae singula tabulis CIII exhibentur : adjecto indice sufficiente (33 editions 1721-1757)
- Conspectus therapiae generalis : cum notis in materiam medicam tabulis XX methodo Stahliana conscriptus (33 editions 1725-1744)
- Conspectus formularum medicarum : exhibens tabulis XVI tam methodum rationalem, quam remediorum specimina, ex praxi Stahliana potissimum desumta, et therapiae generali accomodata (24 editions 1727-2012)
- Conspectvs chemiae theoretico-practicae : in forma tabvalrvm repraesentatvs, in qvibvs physica, praesertim svbterranea, et corporvm natvralivm principia habitvs inter se, proprietates, vires et vsvs itemqve praecipva chemiae pharmacevticae et mechanicae fvndamenta e dogmatibvs Becheri et Stahlii potissimvm explicantvr, eorvndemqve et aliorvm celebrivm chemicorvm experimentis stabilivntvr (1730)
