= François-Antoine-Henri Descroizilles =

French chemist (1751–1825)

- Born: 11 June 1751; Dieppe
- Died: 1825 (aged 73–74)

François-Antoine-Henri Descroizilles was a French chemist and pharmacist and the inventor of titration (volumetric analysis), having invented the burette in 1791. He also invented the French drip coffee pot.

== Early life ==
On 11 June 1751, François was born in the family house on No.17, Palace Royale, Dieppe; the town then one of the largest ports in the French kingdom. He belonged to a family of apothecaries, spicers, and chandlers. His father, François Descroizilles had studied in Paris under Geoffroy de Jussieu and Bernard de Jussieu. He had invented a polychrest salt (a mixture of magnesium sulphate, sodium chloride, and sodium sulphate) designed to function as a laxative, dissolvent, and sedative. François-Antoine-Henri's mother was Reyne Niel.

François-Antoine-Henri received his schooling in humanities at the College of Dieppe. He learned botany also with his father at a young age. After doing a course in pharmacy, his father sent him to Paris. François studied under Guillaume-François Rouelle and his brother Hilaire Rouelle in the city.

== Career ==
The region of Normandy gave rise to many eminent chemists such as Louis Nicolas Vauquelin, Guillaume-François Rouelle, Edward Adam, Pierre Louis Dulong, Victor Grignard, and Marcel Delépine.

In 1777, at the age of 26, he came to Rouen with the certificate demonstrateur royal de chymie. He obtained a license of apprenticeship from Louis XVI issued at Versailles on 14 January 1778 permitting him to establish his practice after he passed the apothecary examination.

=== The affair of the ciders ===
He was soon appointed as an expert by the French parliament in trails against cider adulteration. During these, he incurred the enmity of apothecary Pierre-François Mésaize who was the king's representative in the matter. By challenging Mésaize, Descroizilles was judged guilty of affronting the sovereign himself.

On 27 April 1775, the French Parliament passed a decree penalising 500 Francs and corporal punishment to those involved in cider adulteration with lead. Descroizilles found liver of sulfur useful in detecting lead, and later published this finding in the Archives de Normandie, and was later incorporated in a commission report compiled by Antoine-Alexis Cadet de Vaux, Antoine Baumé, Jean Darcet, Claude Louis Berthollet, and Descroizilles. Descroizilles was fined 3 Francs "and forbidden to repeat the offence under threat of greater punishment," but he appealed against it. Some experiments undertaken later in Paris at the home of Baumé found Descroizilles' claims correct. The latter was cleared of charges and thanked for his work as public welfare.

He remained interested in cider throughout his life. This led him to construct a still and tube to determine alcohol. He also studied the desiccation of apples towards the end of his career.

== Personal life ==
Descroizilles had 15 siblings; 11 sisters and 4 brothers. Nine of his siblings died at an early age. Two of his sisters married apothecaries, while another married a curate. His brother Jean Hyacinthe Alexandre was a botanist who successfully cultivated camomile on the coast of Janval near Dieppe and popularised potato cultivation around. His brother Jacques Frederic emigrated to Réunion where he became a planter.

== Legacy ==
On 30 January 1847, the mayor of Dieppe installed a marble tablet in front of his house commemorating his achievements.
