= Johann Theodor Eller =

German physician, mineralogist and chemist

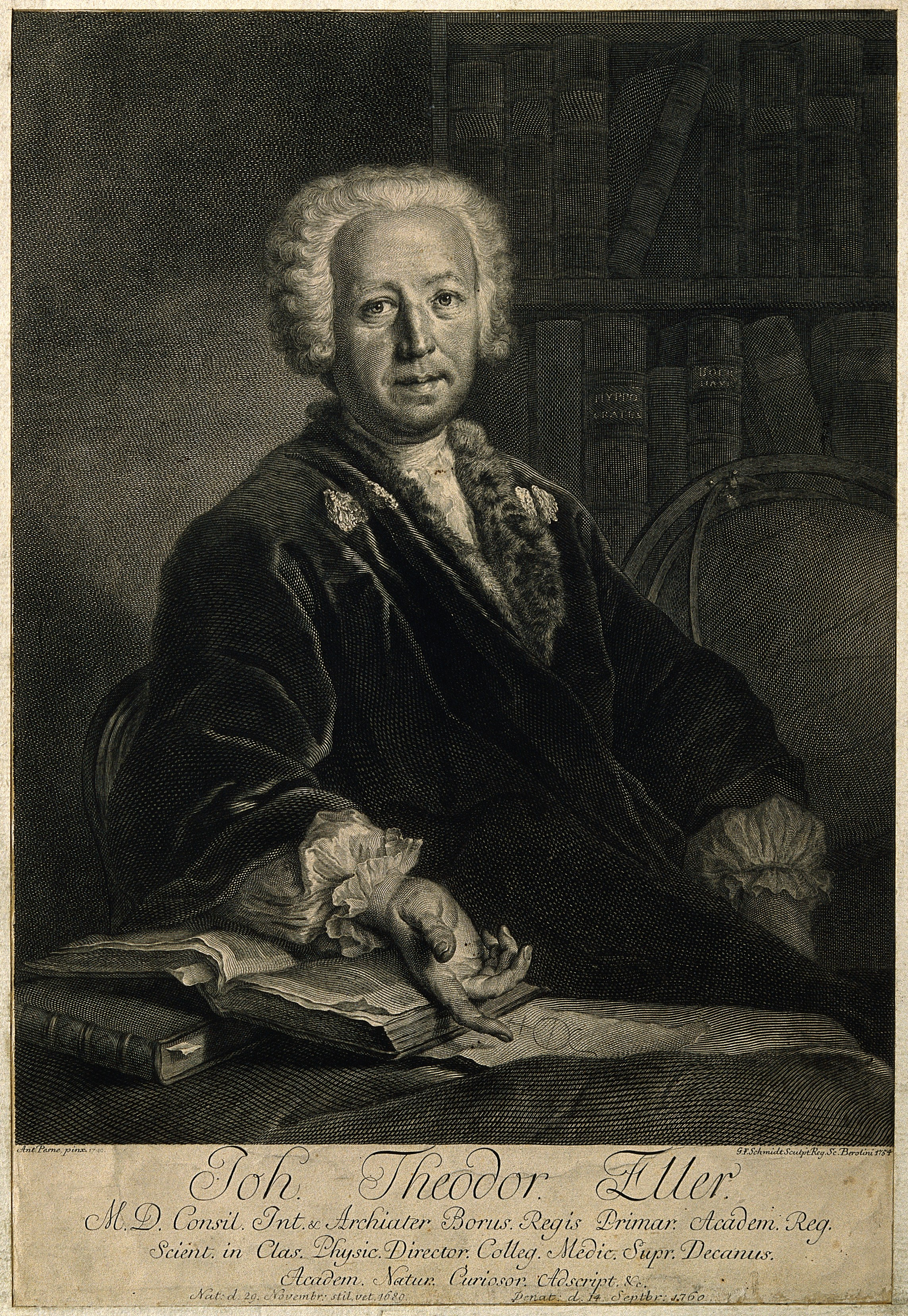
Engraving by G. F. Schmidt, 1754

Johann Theodor Eller (von Brockhausen) (29 November 1689 – 13 September 1760) was a German physician, mineralogist and chemist who served in the Prussian court. Eller followed the beliefs of the day that heat was an element. Lavoisier read his works on air and fire. In his medical research he claimed that copper in cooking utensils was harmful.

== Early life ==
Eller was born in Plötzkau, in the Principality of Anhalt-Zerbst, son of Jobst Hermann Eller, a military officer who had served under the Prince of Anhalt before becoming a justice of peace and an innkeeper. His mother was from a noble family of Livonia.

== Career ==
Tutored initially at home, he was then educated in law at the Quedlinburg gymnasium he went on to study at Jena University in 1709 where he shifted to medicine under G. W. Wedel and H. F. Teichmeyer. He then went to study anatomy in Halle, Leiden (1711) and Amsterdam, studying under the anatomists Frederik Ruysch and Johannes Jacobus Rau. He received his MD from Leiden in 1716. He followed Rau to Leiden and served as a dissector until 1716. He began then to study mineralogy and chemistry in Paris under Grosse, Boulduc, and Lemery. In 1720 he visited London and met the scientists of the day including Isaac Newton. He worked in A. G. Hanckewitz's laboratory before returning to Germany.

In 1721 he became a court physician at Anhalt-Bernberg possibly due to the influence of Georg Ernst Stahl (1724-1734). Two years later he became a professor of anatomy in Berlin. From 1727 to 1735 he was also director of the Berlin's Charité Hospital. In 1740 he became personal physician to Frederick the Great. In 1753 he argued with his colleague Johann Heinrich Pott who wished for a position to be filled by his son-in-law. The position was taken by Brandes, a student of Eller. A public confrontation between Pott and Eller followed.

== Personal life ==
Eller married Catherine Elizabeth Burckhard (d. 1751) in 1721 and after in 1753 he married Henrietta Catherine Rosen.

== Published works ==
Eller published two books:

- Catalogus rerum mineralium et metallicarum (1723)
- Nützliche und auserlesene medicinische und chirurgische Anmerkungen so wohl von innerlichen als auch äußerlichen Krankheiten, und bey selbigen zum Theil verrichteten Operationen, Welche bishero in dem von Sr. Königl. Majestät in Preußen gestifteten großen Lazareth der Charité zu Berlin, vorgefallen; Nebst einer vorangegebnen kurtzen Beschreibung der Stiftung, Anwachs und jetzigen Beschaffenheit dieses Hauses (1730)
