= Ambrose Godfrey =

German-English chemist (1660–1741)

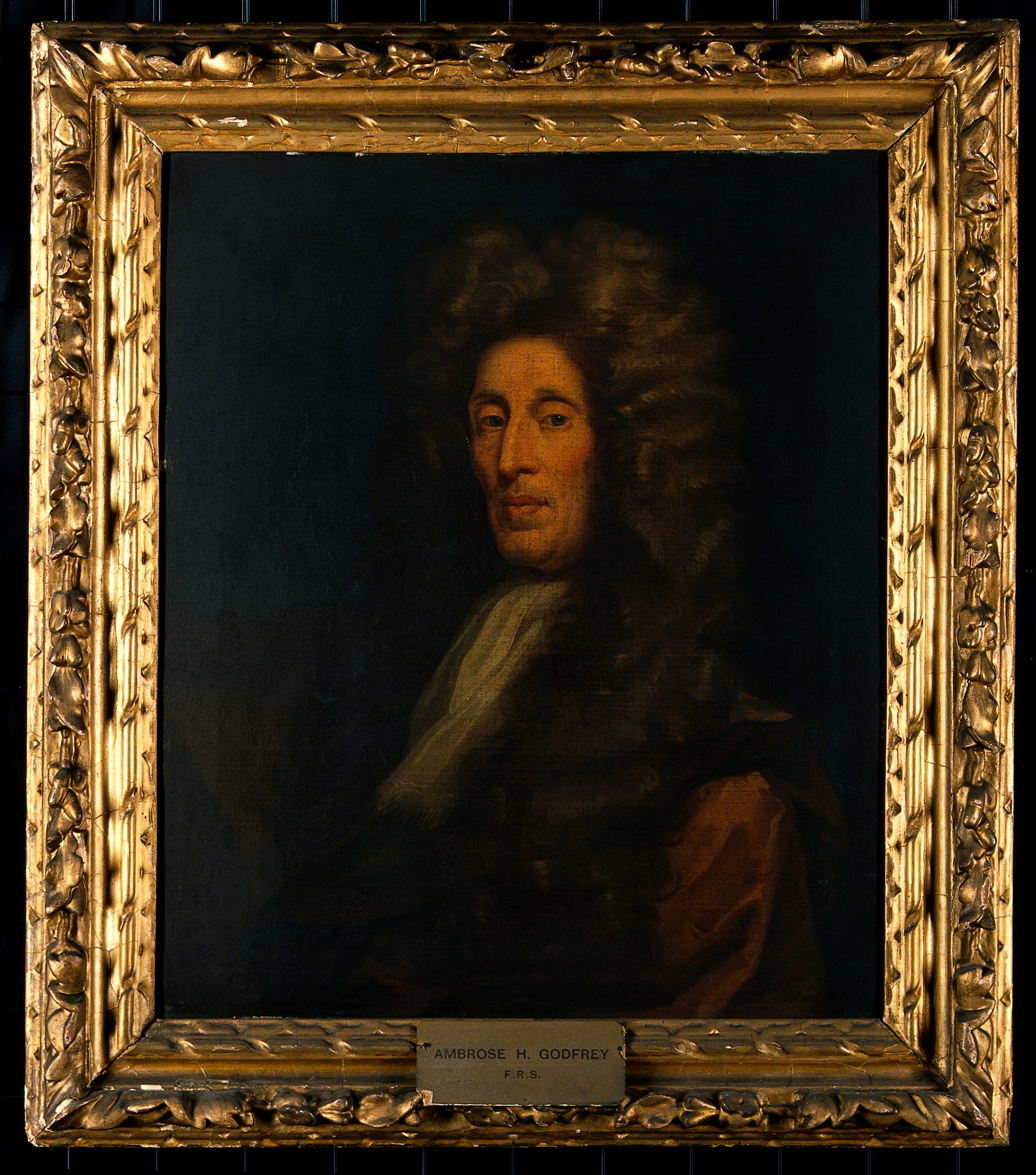
Oil painting of Ambrose Godfrey

Ambrose Godfrey-Hanckwitz FRS (1660 – 15 January 1741), also known as Gottfried Hankwitz, also written Hanckewitz, or Ambrose Godfrey as he preferred to be known, was a German-born British phosphorus manufacturer and apothecary. He was one of the first phosphorus manufacturers and was one of the best and most successful in his time. He invented and patented a machine that acted as a fire extinguisher.

== Life and work ==
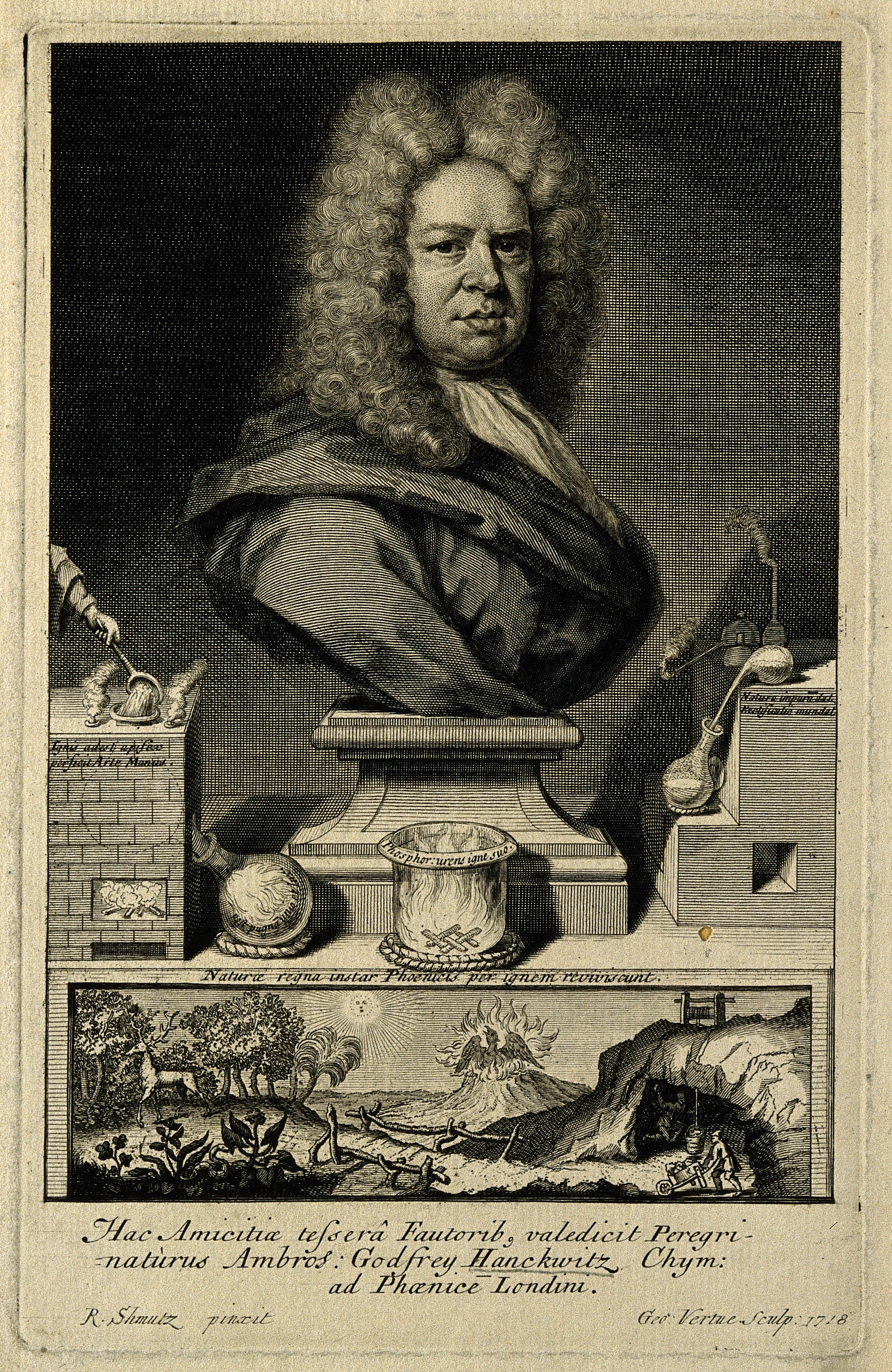
Engraving of Ambrose Godfrey by George Vertue

Godfrey was born in Köthen (Anhalt), Germany. In 1679, aged 19, he and his wife travelled to London where he was to work as an assistant to Robert Boyle, trying to produce phosphorus. Boyle is remembered as the first chemist, but his earliest interests were in alchemy, and he wanted to learn about the then new phosphorus. Boyle had employed German alchemist Johann Becher who was in London looking for work. Becher recommended Ambrose Godfrey as an assistant.

Boyle knew from hints given by Daniel Kraft (when he had demonstrated phosphorus) that it was made from human urine or maybe faeces, but neither Boyle's first employee Bilger nor then Becher and Godfrey were able to make it. But Becher knew that its first discoverer Hennig Brandt had the secret. Godfrey was sent to Hamburg to see Brandt and came back with the missing key: that very high temperatures were needed.

On his return Godfrey tried a new batch of urine. He used so much heat that it cracked the retort, but Boyle saw the residue in the broken container glowed faintly, so they were on the right track. Godfrey's job became making phosphorus for Boyle, and he acquired skill at it. His procedure was the same as Brandt's, namely to boil human urine down to a residue, then heat that strongly to give off phosphorus gas which would condense. Godfrey produced two forms: solid phosphorus (the white phosphorus allotrope) and a mix with oil of urine where it remains liquid at room temperature.

Initially Becher and Godfrey had got along well and they shared lodgings in Covent Garden. When Becher's wife arrived in London it seems she took a dislike to Godfrey and there were various disagreements. Godfrey helped the Bechers move to new lodgings, yet Mrs Becher would return to shout abuse and accusations. The worst was when Boyle reduced Becher's salary over lack of success in Becher's alchemical experiments. Becher blamed Godfrey, and Mrs Becher took to following Mrs Godfrey through the streets shouting abuse.

By 1682 two years of research had satisfied Boyle's curiosity and Boyle and Godfrey parted. Godfrey was still interested in phosphorus and Boyle helped finance Godfrey's manufacture of it. In 1683 Godfrey named his first son Boyle Godfrey, in Boyle's honour. (He had two more sons, Ambrose and John.)

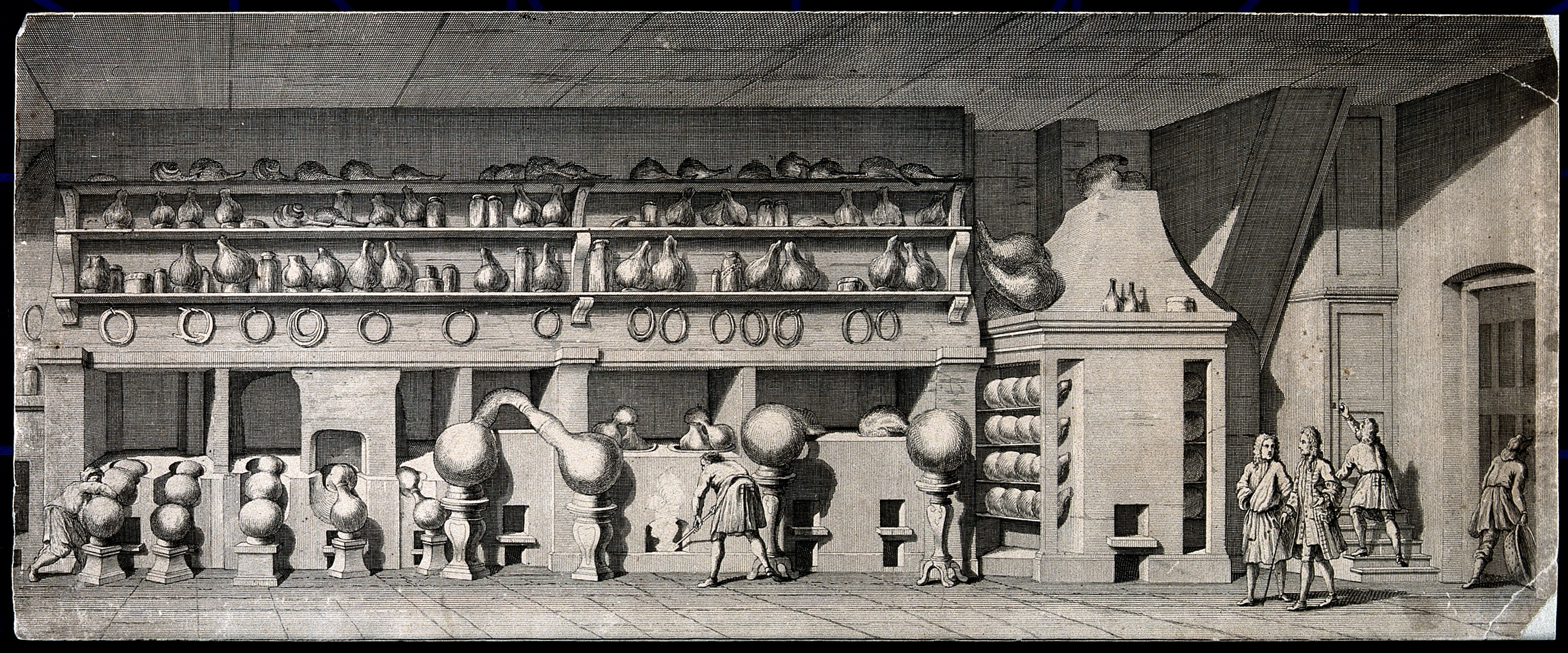
Etching of Ambrose Godrey's chemical laboratory

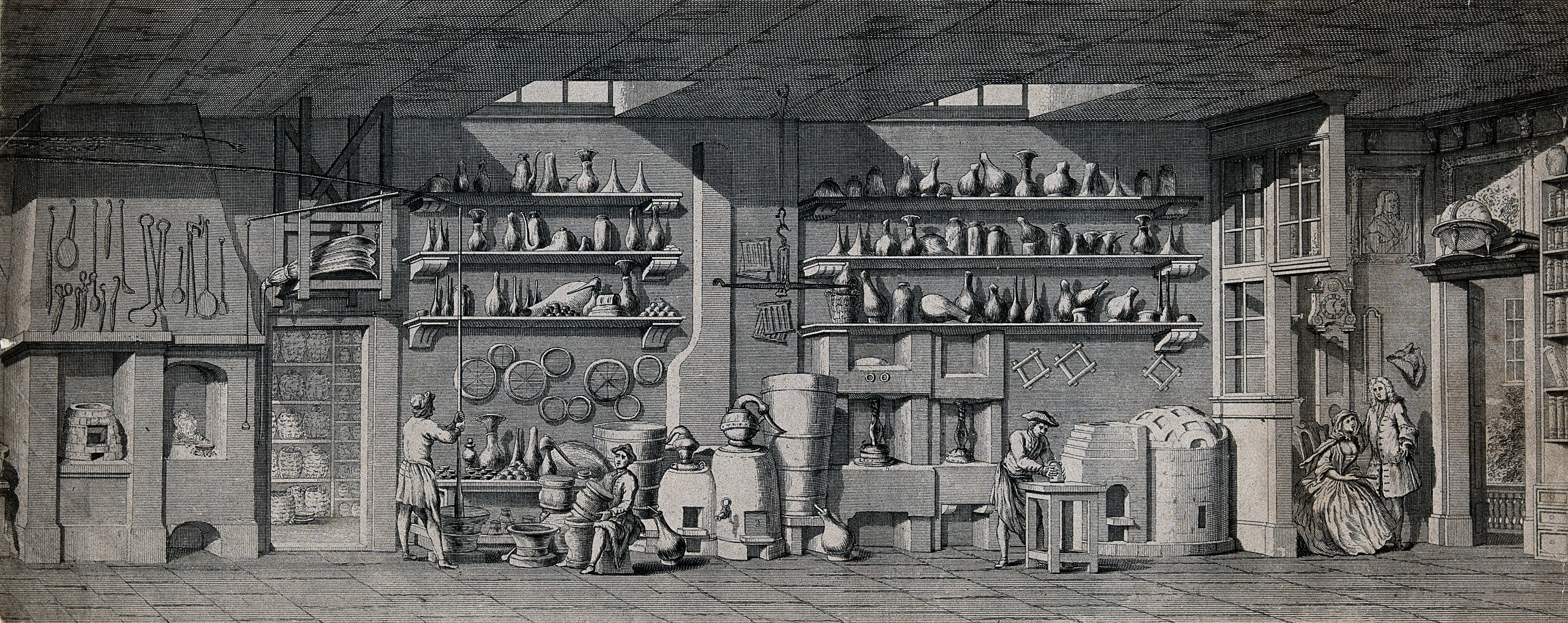
Ambrose Godfrey's chemical factory

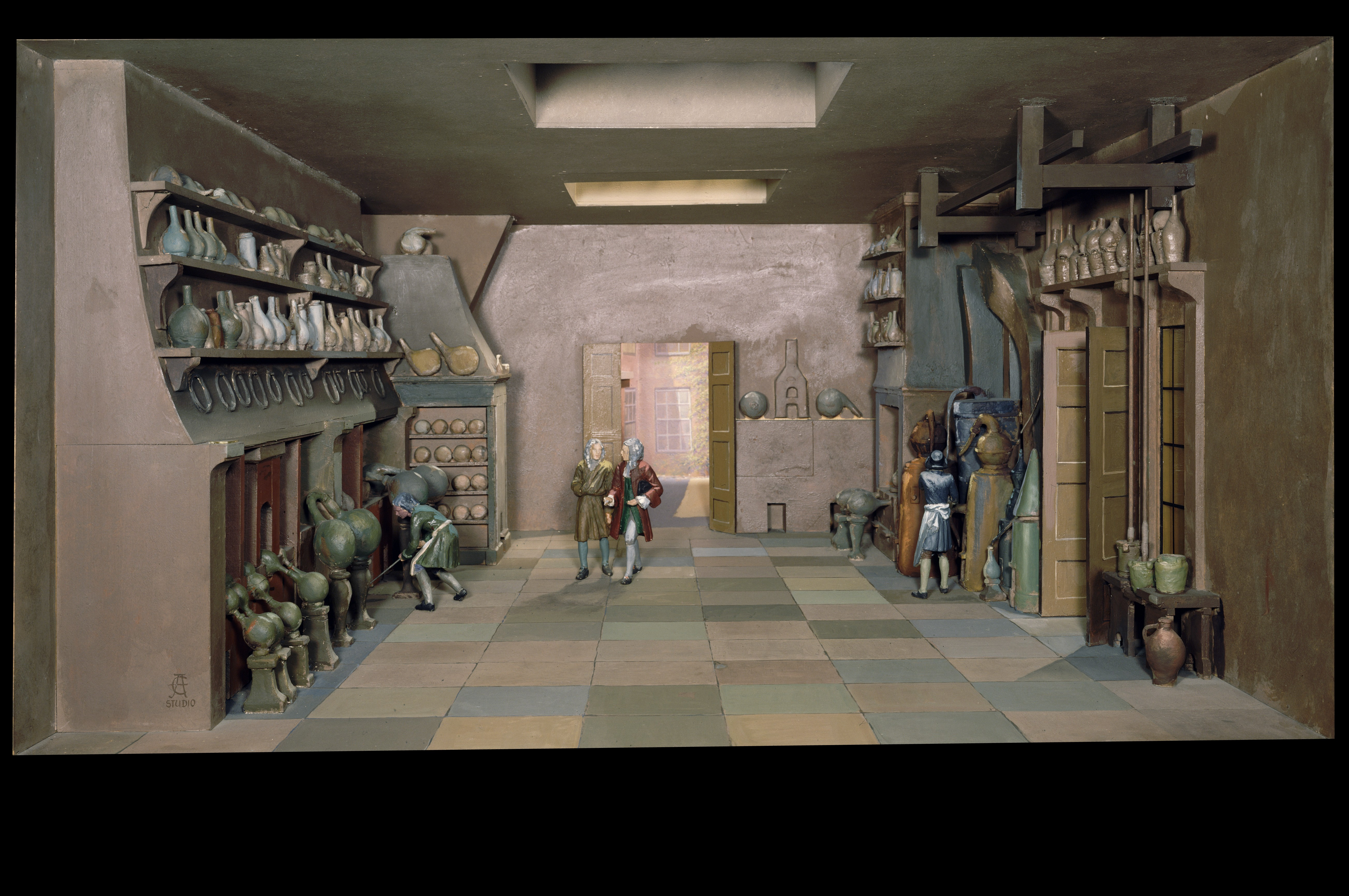
Diorama of Ambrose Godfrey's chemical laboratory

By 1685, Godfrey had a going business. He had a furnace behind his lodgings and made use of the human wastes from the adjoining Bedford House estate. He advertised phosphorus at 50 shillings wholesale or 60 shillings(around 5 or 6 pence now) retail an ounce, and was selling all he could make. He improved production by melting the final phosphorus and forcing it through a chamois leather to purify. But his main employment was at Apothecaries Hall, where in time he became master of the laboratory.

Others tried to make phosphorus too, without success. It was supposed there was a step missing from what Boyle had published in 1682, a step only Godfrey knew. Godfrey had every reason to keep his methods secret, but the essentials were exactly as Boyle had set out. The only extra thing Godfrey knew was that faeces could be used as well as urine.

Godfrey's business grew along with his reputation, and he took on employees, becoming known for producing the best phosphorus available. He sold within Britain and exported to Europe. By the early 18th century, Godfrey was thought to be selling as much as 50 lb a year, worth about £2,000, or about £600,000 in today's money. This was not his only business, but presumably the profit from such a turnover was significant.

In 1707, Godfrey was wealthy enough to buy the lease to a new shop in Southampton Street where the Bedford House estate had stood. He opened a pharmacy, and he and his family lived above it. Under the lease he could not carry on "obnoxious" trade there, but the narrow strip of land behind was unrestricted, so he built a workshop there, where he and his staff made phosphorus, and where he gave demonstrations of it.

Godfrey died on 15 January 1741 and his oldest son, Boyle Godfrey, took over the business. But Boyle dabbled in alchemy, wasted his inheritance, and had to live on a pension provided by his brothers Ambrose and John, who took over the business in 1742. Ambrose and John were also unsuccessful and in 1746 were declared bankrupt. The business passed to their nephew, Boyle's son, named Ambrose Godfrey after his grandfather. The younger Ambrose was successful, carrying on the business until his death in 1797, when it passed in turn to his son Ambrose Towers Godfrey, who formed a partnership with Charles Cooke. The firm Godfrey and Cooke continued until 1915.

The Godfrey business' dominance in phosphorus did not last. It was overtaken by new methods such as that of Bertrand Pelletier using bones in the 1770s.

== Bibliography ==
- John Emsley, The Shocking History of Phosphorus, 2000, ISBN 0-330-39005-8.
- L. M. Principe, The Aspiring Adept, Robert Boyle and his Alchemical Quest, Princeton N.J.: Princeton University Press, 1998, pp. 134–136.
