= Didier-François d'Arclais de Montamy =

- Born: 1702; Souleuvre en Bocage
- Died: 8 February 1765 (aged 62–63); Paris
- Education: University of Caen Normandy
- Occupations: Civil servant, nature scholar and encyclopédiste

Didier-François d’Arclais de Montamy (1702, Montamy – 8 February 1765) was an 18th-century French civil servant, nature scholar and encyclopédiste.

De Montamy was the son of Jean Joseph, sieur de Montamy d'Arclais, seigneur de Montamy, and Marie Françoise Guillard de La Madeleine. Grand Master of France for the duke of Orléans, D'Arclais de Montamy had a high scientific education, but he was also interested in the fine arts. He translated from the German by Johann Heinrich Pott (1692–1777), la Lithogéognosie ou Examen des pierres et des terres (Paris, 1753, 2 vol. in-12°).

In 1762, he was made Chevalier de Saint Lazare de Jérusalem.

He wrote the article "Porcelaine de la Chine" for the Encyclopédie by Diderot and d'Alembert (vol. VII, 117-22).

== Works (selection) ==
- 1753: La Lithogéognosie ou Examen des pierres et des terres, Paris,
- 1765: Traité des couleurs pour la peinture en émail et sur la porcelaine, Chez G. Cavelier, Paris., preceded by Art de peindre sur l’émail (Paris, 1765), posthumous work published by Diderot.

== Sources ==
- Pierre Larousse, Grand Dictionnaire universel du XIX, vol. 11, Paris, Administration du grand Dictionnaire universel, (p. 486).
