= Fire air =

Historic theorized fluid making up air

In the history of chemistry, fire air was postulated to be one of two fluids of common air. This theory was positioned in 1775 by Swedish chemist Carl Wilhelm Scheele. In Scheele's Chemical Treatise on Air and Fire he states: "air is composed of two fluids, differing from each other, the one of which does not manifest in the least the property of attracting phlogiston, whilst the other, which composes between the third and fourth part of the whole mass of the air, is peculiarly disposed to such attraction." These two constituents of common air Scheele called Foul Air ("verdorbene Luft") and Fire Air ("Feuerluft"); afterwards these components came to be known as nitrogen and oxygen, respectively.

== See also ==
- Heat
