= Bertrand Pelletier =

French pharmacist and chemist (1761-1797)

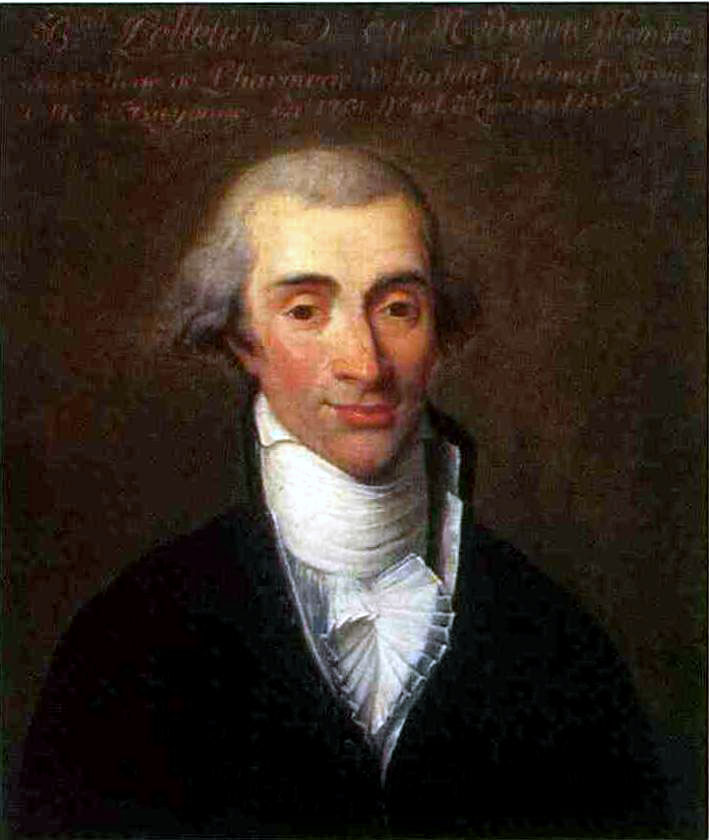
- Born: 31 July 1761; Bayonne
- Died: 21 July 1797 (aged 35); Paris
- Occupations: Pharmacist; Chemist
- Spouse: Marguerite Sedillot

Bertrand Pelletier (31 July 1761 – 21 July 1797) was an 18th-century French pharmacist and chemist.

== Biography ==
Bertrand Pelletier was the son of the pharmacist Bertrand Pelletier, and his wife Marie Sabatier. After training with his father, which lasted until 1778, he continued his apprenticeship with Bernard Coubet in Paris. There, Pelletier became friend with Jean Darcet (1725–1801) and Pierre Bayen (1725–1798). In 1782, he became Darcet's assistant and demonstrator at the Collège de France. The same year, his first publication on the preparation and properties of arsenic acid was published in François Rozier's Journal d’observations sur la Physique, l’Histoire naturelle et sur les Arts et Métiers

On the recommendation of Darcet, Hilaire Rouelle's widow appointed him managing director of the pharmacy rue Jacob in 1783. The following year, Pelletier was master apothecary, married Marguerite Sedillot and bought Rouelle's pharmacy. From 1783, Pelletier was a student at the Paris Faculty of Medicine, where he made but no degree.

In 1784, on a suggestion from crystallographer Jean-Baptiste Romé de L’Isle, Pelletier produced strongly soluble salt crystals through slow evaporation and inoculation. A year later, he confirmed Carl Wilhelm Scheele's discovery that chlorine can be produced from hydrochloric acid and manganese. Like Claude Louis Berthollet, Pelletier arrived to the false conclusion that the resulting gas was a combination of hydrochloric acid and oxygen. An adherent to Carl Wilhelm Scheele's phlogiston theory, Pelletier followed Lavoisier's more modern approaches only after 1787. From 1785 to 1792, he studied phosphorus in depth. He succeeded for the first time the presentation of phosphides of many metals.

During the French Revolution, Pelletier was a member of the Bureau de Consultation des Arts et Metiers and the Commission Temporaire des Arts. In 1790 he undertook two trips to Reims where he passed the exams to be a doctor. In 1792, Pelletier was selected to be a member of the French Academy of Sciences. In 1794, he was appointed assistant-professor to the newly created École polytechnique and in 1795 was chosen to be a member of the Institut de France where he followed the course on mineral chemistry by Louis-Bernard Guyton de Morveau.

== Publications ==
Information taken mostly from Johann Christian Poggendorff: Biographisch–literarisches Handwörterbuch zur Geschichte der exacten Wissenschaften. Zweiter Band M–Z, Verlag von Johann Ambrosius Barth, Leipzig 1863, (p. 391–392) (online).

=== Articles ===
- 1782: Observations sur l’acide arsenical. In Observations sur la Physique, sur l’Histoire Naturelle et sur les Arts. Volume 19, (p. 127–136) (online).
- 1782: Observations sur la Crystallisation artificielle du Soufre & du cinabre. In Observations sur la Physique, sur l’Histoire Naturelle et sur les Arts. Volume 19, (p. 311–314) (online).
- 1782: Sur des Phénomènes observés dans la Chaux vive, dans la préparation de l’Acide phosphorique, & sur la décomposition du Phosphore par l'acide arsenical. In Observations sur la Physique, sur l’Histoire Naturelle et sur les Arts. Volume 19, (p. 463–465) (online).
- 1782: Examen chymique. D’une Substance pierreuse, venant des mines de Fribourg en Brisgaw, désignée par les Naturalistes sous le nom de Zéolite; précédé de l’analyse de la Zéolite de Feroé. In Observations sur la Physique, sur l’Histoire Naturelle et sur les Arts. Volume 20, (p. 402) – (online).
- 1784: Mémoire sur la cristallisation des Sels déliquescens, avec des observations sur les Sels en général. In Observations sur la Physique, sur l’Histoire Naturelle et sur les Arts. Volume 25, (p. 205–219) (online).
- 1785: Lettre [de Pelletier] à M. Mongez le jeune, sur les schorls violets des Pyrénées. In Observations sur la Physique, sur l’Histoire Naturelle et sur les Arts. Volume 26,(p. 66–67) (online).
- 1785: Observations diverses. Sur l’acide marin dephlogistiqué, relatives à l’absorption de l’air dephlogistiqué par l’acide marin. In Observations sur la Physique, sur l’Histoire Naturelle et sur les Arts. Volume 26, (p. 389–397)(online).
- 1785: Suite des Observations. Sur l’acide marin dephlogistiqué . In Observations sur la Physique, sur l’Histoire Naturelle et sur les Arts. Volume 26, (p. 452–455) (online).
- 1785: Nouvelles observations sur la formation des Éthers. In Observations sur la Physique, sur l’Histoire Naturelle et sur les Arts. Volume 26, (p. 455–460) (online).
- 1785: Observations résultantes de l’opération du phosphore faite en grand. In Observations sur la Physique, sur l’Histoire Naturelle et sur les Arts. Volume 27, (p. 26–32) (online).
- 1785: Extrait d’un Mémoire. Sur l’analyse de la plombagine et de la molybdène. In Observations sur la Physique, sur l’Histoire Naturelle et sur les Arts. Volume 27, (p. 343–362) (online).
- 1785: Suite du Mémoire. Sur l’analyse de la plombagine et de la molybdène. Senconde Partie. De la molybdène. In Observations sur la Physique, sur l’Histoire Naturelle et sur les Arts. Volume 27, (p. 434–447) (online)
- 1786: Extrait d’un Mémoire. Sur l’Ether acéteux, & sur un Sel particulier d’une nature analogue aux acides végétaux, ou Sels essentiels acides. In Observations sur la Physique, sur l’Histoire Naturelle et sur les Arts. Volume 28, (p. 138–143)(online)
- 1787: Lettre [de Pelletier] à M. de La Metherie sur la rectification de l’Éther vitriolique, particulièrement de celui que l’on emploie pour les Arts. In Observations sur la Physique, sur l’Histoire Naturelle et sur les Arts. Volume 31, (p. 178–179)(online).
- 1789: Lettre [de Pelletier] à MM. les rédacteurs du Journal de Physique, sur la molybdène d’Altemberg en Saxe. In Observations sur la Physique, sur l’Histoire Naturelle et sur les Arts. Volume 34, (p. 127–129) (online).
- 1789: Extrait d’un seconde Mémoire sur le phosphore, Dans lequel il est traité de sa combinaison directe avec les Substances métalliques. In Observations sur la Physique, sur l’Histoire Naturelle et sur les Arts. Band 34, 1789, S. 193–201 (online).
- 1790: Extrait d’un Travail. Sur le Phosphore, dans lequel il est traité de sa combinaison avec le Soufre, &c. In Observations sur la Physique, sur l’Histoire Naturelle et sur les Arts. Volume 35, (p. 378–384) (online).
- 1792: Observations sur plusieurs propriétés du muriate d'étain. In Observations sur la Physique, sur l’Histoire Naturelle et sur les Arts. Volume 40, (p. 307–313) (online).
- 1792: Extrait d’un Mémoire. Sur les cendres bleues. In Observations sur la Physique, sur l’Histoire Naturelle et sur les Arts. Volume 40, (p. 320) (online).
- 1790: Expériences sur le phosphate calcaire d’Estremadure. In Annales de Chimie. Volume 7, (p. 79–96) – with Louis Donadei
- 1791: Moyen. Dont on peut faire usage, pour distinguer plusieurs mines de plomb spathiques, ou à l’état terreux, des sulfates de baryte, ou spaths pesans, avec lesquels on les confond quelquefois, proposé. In Annales de Chimie. Volume 9, (p. 56–58)(online).
- 1791: Analyse de la terre phosphorique de Kobolo–Bojana, Près de Sigeth, dans le Comitat de Marmarosch, en Hongrie. In: Annales de Chimie. Volume 9, (p. 225–234) (online).
- 1791: Observations sur l’affinage du métal des cloches. In Annales de Chimie. Volume 10, (p. 155–161) (online).
- 1791: Analyse du Carbonate de Barite natif des mines de Zmeof, dans les monts Altaï, entre l’Ob et l’Irtiche, en Sibérie. In Annales de Chimie. Volume 10, (p. 186–189) (online).
- 1792: Examen chimique des cendres bleues, et Procédé pour les préparer. In Annales de Chimie. Volume 13, (p. 47–66)(online).
- 1792: Quatrième Mémoire sur le phosphore, faisant suite aux expériences sur la combinaison du phosphore avec les substances métalliques. In Annales de Chimie. Volume 13, (p. 113–121) (online).
- 1792: Cinquième Mémoire sur le phosphore, faisant suite aux combinaisons du phosphore avec les substances métalliques. In Annales de Chimie. Volume 13, (p. 121–143) (online).
- 1792: Rapport. Fait au Bureau de Consultation, sur la Colle–forte des os proposée par M. Grenet. In Annales de Chimie. Volume 13, (p. 192–212) (online). – with Parmentier
- 1792: Sur la combinaison de l’étain avec le soufre. In Annales de Chimie. Volume 13, (p. 280–311) (online)
- 1792: Rapport. Faitau Bureau de Consultation, sur les moyens proposés par M. Jeanety pour travailler le Platine. In Annales de Chimie. Volume 14, (p. 20–33) 20–33 (online). – with Berthollet
- 1792: Mémoire Sur les préparations des acides phosphorique et phosphoreux. Observations sur le phosphate de soude. In Annales de Chimie. Volume 14, (p. 113–122) (online).
- 1792: Analyse du Carbonate de Potasse, & Observations sur ce Sel. In Annales de Chimie. Volume 15, (p. 23–137) (online)
- 1797: Extrait d’un Rapport sur les essais faits à Romilli, pour opéret en grandi l’affinage du metal des cloches, afin d'en séparer le cuivre. In Annales de Chimie. Volume 20, (p. 1–14) (online). d'Arcet
- 1797: Analyse de la terre de Houssage provenant de la decomposition de la pierre calcaire forte, des grottes du Pulo de Molfetta, en Pouille, envoyée au Cabinet minéralogique de l’hôtel de la Monnaie, en 1781, par le ministre de Naples. In Annales de Chimie. Volume 23, (p. 33–35) (online).
- 1797: Observations sur diverses préparations barytiques. In Recueil périodique de la Société de Médecine. Volume 2, (p. 48–52) (online).
- 1797: Note sur la présence de la strontiane dans le sulfate de baryte. In Bulletin des Sciences, par la Société Ühilomatique. Volume 1, (p. 37) (online).
- 1798: Procédé pour dissoudre la gomme élastique dans l'éther sulfurique. In Mémoires de l'Institut National des Sciences et Arts. Volume 1, (p. 56–57) (online).
- 1798: Observation sur la strontiane. In Mémoires de l'Institut National des Sciences et Arts. Volume 1, (p. 58–74) (online).
- 179? Extrait d’un Rapport Sur un alliage métallique envoyé par la commission des finances du Corps législatifs pour en faire l'examen. In Mémoires de l’Institut National des Sciences et Arts. Volume 3, (p. 43–44) (online).

=== Books ===
- Description de divers procédés pour extraire la soude du sel marin. Paris 1794? (online).
- Instruction sur l’art de séparer le cuivre du métal des cloches. Paris 1794? (online). – mit d'Arcet
- Charles Pelletier (Hrsg.): Memoires et observations de chimie de Bertrand Pelletier. 2 Bände, Croullebois, Paris 1798 (Band 1, Band 2).

== Studies ==
- Paul Dorveaux: Apothicaires membres de l’Académie des Sciences: XIII. Bertrand Pelletier. In: Revue d’histoire de la pharmacie. Band 25, No. 97, 1937, S. 5–24 (online).
- W. A. Smeaton: Pelletier, Bertrand. In: Complete Dictionary of Scientific Biography. Band 10, Charles Scribner's Sons, Detroit 2008, S. 496–497 (online).
