= Montamy =

- Part of Souleuvre-en-Bocage
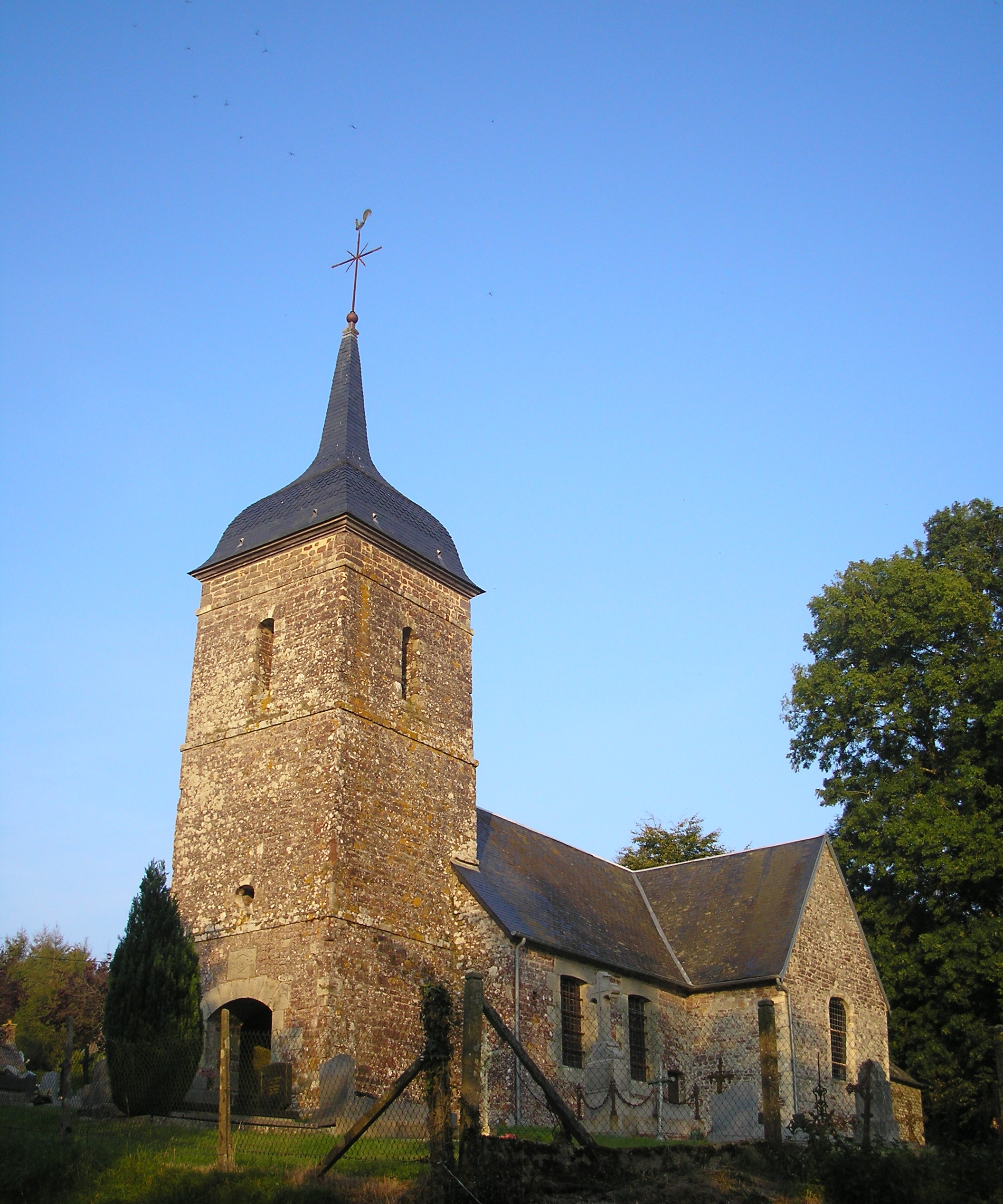
- Location of Montamy
- Location within France Location within Normandy
- Coordinates: 48°58′24″N 0°45′51″W
- Country: France
- Region: Normandy
- Department: Calvados
- Arrondissement: Vire
- Canton: Condé-en-Normandie
- Commune: Souleuvre-en-Bocage
- Area^{1}: 3.67 km^{2} (1.42 sq mi)
- Elevation: 247 m (810 ft)
- Highest elevation: 294 m (965 ft)
- Lowest elevation: 183 m (600 ft)
- Population (2023): 90
  - Density: 25/km^{2} (64/sq mi)
- Time zone: UTC+01:00 (CET)
  - Summer (DST): UTC+02:00 (CEST)
- Postal code: 14260
- ^{1} French Land Register data, which excludes lakes, ponds, glaciers > 1 km^{2} (0.386 sq mi or 247 acres) and river estuaries.

Montamy (French pronunciation: [mɔ̃tami]) is a former commune in the Calvados department in the Normandy region in northwestern France. On 1 January 2016, it was merged into the new commune of Souleuvre-en-Bocage. The 18th-century French civil servant and encyclopédiste Didier-François d'Arclais de Montamy was born in Montany.

== See also ==
- Communes of the Calvados department
