= City physician =

Historical role of city-appointed physician

City physician (German: Stadtphysicus, Stadtphysikus, Stadtarzt; Swedish: stadsfysikus, stadsläkare, Finnish: kaupunginfysikus, kaupunginlääkäri, from Latin physicus) was a historical title in the Late Middle Ages for a physician appointed by the city council. The city physician was responsible for the health of the population, particularly the poor, and the sanitary conditions in the city. His duties also included the supervision of pharmacies and the supervision of those engaged in medical tasks, such as midwives and barber surgeons. In addition, he had forensic duties such as assessing the injuries of living persons, external postmortem examinations, and conducting autopsies in cases of non-natural and unexplained deaths. In times of epidemic, many city physicians published small, printed books of guidelines. His functions combined aspects of the modern health minister, chief medical officer, coroner, and medical/pharmaceutical licensing authority.

The role existed in what are today a number of European countries, including Germany, Estonia, Finland, Norway, Poland, Sweden, and Switzerland.

== Holy Roman Empire and German Confederation ==
A Stadtphysicus or Stadtphysikus (learned "body" physician in contrast to the practice-oriented chirurgicus) or Stadtarzt (also, in about the 15th century in Augsburg, referred to as Stadt-Leibarzt) was appointed by the city council and, in addition to his private practice, performed roughly the tasks of a modern-day health department. The designation physicus was the title for the civil servant physician in Prussia until 1901.

Well-known early city physicians include Hugh of Lucca, who was appointed surgeon in Bologna, Italy, in 1214, and William of Saliceto, who was appointed city physician in Verona, Italy in 1275. Other cities in the Empire established physician positions in the 13th and 14th centuries. Later, per the 1426 decree of Emperor Sigismund, all cities in the Holy Roman Empire were required to hire a city physician.

In the late 16th and early 17th centuries, the preparation of calendars with astrological weather forecasts was also often performed by city physicians.

Some city physicians also acted as personal physicians (Leibärzte) to noble or ecclesiastical dignitaries.

In less densely populated regions, the office was combined as city and district physician (Stadt- und Kreisphysicus), who had to care for or supervise a specific medical district in addition to the city.

The deputy of the city physician was called Subphysicus, e.g. in Hamburg.

== Sweden ==
In Sweden, city physicians (Swedish: stadsläkare, formerly stadsfysikus) were responsible for the duties in cities which in rural areas belonged to provincial physicians (provinsialläkare).

As early as the beginning of the 17th century, some of Sweden's cities (Stockholm, Gothenburg, Falun, Gävle, Malmö and Kalmar) hired a stadsfysikus in their service. In 1669, a city surgeon (city barber) was hired to work alongside the city physician in Stockholm, to assist in the treatment of external diseases and accidents. By royal decree in 1827, both posts were transformed into those of city physician (first and second city physician). In 1757, the first city district doctors in Stockholm (three in number) were employed to provide medical care for the city's ailing poor.

In Stockholm, Gothenburg and Malmö, the chief city physician or city physician was equal to the chief provincial physician in the counties, with almost the same duties as the latter. City doctors were appointed by the city council (stadsfullmäktige), after the Medical Board had given an opinion on the competence of the respective applicants and the city's health board had been given the opportunity to give its opinion on the matter.

City district physicians (stadsdistriktsläkare), that is to say, persons who exercised the function of city physicians only within a certain district of the city, were appointed in the same order by the city council, unless the administration of the public health service was entrusted to the board of health, in which case the appointment of these physicians could also be entrusted to the same board.

In Stockholm, the role of city physician was established in 1827 and lasted until 1971.

== Finland ==
The position of city physician (Finnish: kaupunginfysikus, later kaupunginlääkäri) existed in Finland during the Swedish era and for a time after the country declared independence. Turku was the first city to hire a city physician, in 1755, and Helsinki was the second in 1774.

== Norway ==
In Norway, Bergen was the first city to have a city physician (stadsfysikus or bylege, lit. 'city doctor'), appointed in 1603. Oslo's city physician role existed from 1626 until it was abolished in 1988; its city physician also held the role of head of the city's health council. In Trondheim, the post was created in 1661, with Jens Nicolaisen as its first doctor.

== City physicians ==
- William of Saliceto (after 1210 – c. 1286), Lombard surgeon, professor in Bologna and city physician in Verona from 1275
- Hugh of Lucca (c. 1270–1259), city surgeon and court physician in Bologna
- Konrad Müntzmeister (14th–15th century), city physician in Straßburg
- Heinrich Steinhöwel (1410–1411 – 1479), city physician in Ulm
- Hans Seyff (c. 1440 – after 1518), German wound surgeon and leading surgeon of the Late Middle Ages
- Johann Stocker (1453–1513), city physician in Ulm
- Theophrastus Bombastus von Hohenheim, called Paracelsus (1493–1541), city physician in Basel
- Georgius Agricola (1494–1555), city physician in Chemnitz
- Christoph Stathmion (c. 1508–1509 – 1585), city physician in Coburg
- Paulus Kyr (c. 1510 – 1588), Transylvanian city physician in Brașov
- Wilhelm Schefferlein (died 1594), city physician in Bad Neustadt an der Saale, director of the Würzburg Juliusspital
- Conrad Gessner (1516–1565), chief city physician in Zurich
- Thomas Schöpf (1520–1577), city physician in Colmar and Bern
- Johannes Ewich (1525–1588), city physician in Bremen
- Peter de Spina I. (1526–1569), city physician in Aachen
- Joachim Strupp (1530–1606), city physician in Frankfurt am Main
- Peter Memmius (1531–1587), city physician in Lübeck
- Caspar Ratzenberger (1533–1603), city physician in Naumburg/Saale
- Zacharias Stopius (c. 1535 – late 16th or early 17th century), city physician in Riga
- Felix Platter (1536–1614), city physician in Basel
- Johannes Wittich (1537–1596), city physician in Arnstadt and personal physician to the Counts of Schwarzburg
- Johann Thal (1542–1583), city physician in Nordhausen
- Wilhelm Fabry (1560–1634), wound surgeon, city physician in Bern and founder of scientific surgery
- Raymund Minderer (c. 1565–1570 – 1621), city physician in Augsburg
- Martin Ruland the Younger (1569–1611), city physician in Regensburg
- Johann Remmelin (1583–1632), city physician in Ulm, Schorndorf and Augsburg
- Johann Agricola (1590–1668), city physician in Frankenhausen, Altenburg and Wrocław
- Johannes May (1592–1671), city physician in Römhild and Coburg
- Johannes Scultetus (1595–1645), city physician in Ulm
- Cornelius Pleier (1595 – c. 1646–1649), city physician in Coburg and Kitzingen
- Johann Lorenz Bausch (1605–1665), city physician in Altorf
- Balthasar Uloth (1608–1642), city physician in Darmstadt and Babenhausen
- Philipp Jakob Sachs (1627–1672), city physician in Wrocław
- Johann Peter Albrecht (1647–1724), city physician in Hildesheim
- Benjamin Scharff (1651–1702), city physician in Sondershausen, Weißensee and personal physician to the prince of Schwarzburg-Sondershausen
- Georg Henning Behrens (1662–1712), city physician in Nordhausen
- Christoph von Hellwig (1663–1721), city physician at Erfurt, editor of the Hundertjähriger Kalender (Centennial Calendar)
- Siegmund Hahn (1664–1742) and his son Johann Siegmund Hahn (1696–1773), city physicians in Świdnica
- Eberhard Barnstorff (1672–1712), city physician in Anklam and Greifswald
- Johann Philipp Burggrav (1673–1746), city physician in Darmstadt
- Johann Storch (1681–1751), city physician in Eisenach
- Johannes Burchart V (1683–1738) and son Johannes Burchart VI (1718–1756), city physicians in Tallinn
- Nathanael Sendel (1686–1757), city physician in Elbląg
- Georg Christian Maternus de Cilano (1696–1773), city physician in Altona, Hamburg
- Peter Carpser (1699–1759), city physician in Hamburg
- Bernhard Feldmann (1704–1776), city physician in Neuruppin
- Johannes Christoph Ludwig Beringer (1709–1746), city and district physician in Heidelberg, personal physician to the prince-bishop of Speyer
- Johann Jakob Kollmann (1714–1778), city physician in Deggendorf
- Joachim Friedrich Bolten (1718–1796), city physician in Hamburg
- Friedrich Ludwig Christian Cropp (1718–1796), deputy city physician in Hamburg
- Johann Friedrich Struensee (1737–1772), city physician in Altona, later minister in Copenhagen
- Friedrich von Wendt (1738–1818), city physician in Pszczyna
- Ernst Ludwig Heim (1747–1834), city physician in Spandau
- Arnold Wienholt (1749–1804), city physician in Bremen
- Johann Wilhelm Ludwig von Luce (1756–1842), city physician and pharmacist in Kuressaare
- Friedrich August Röber (1765–1827), city physician in Dresden
- Wilhelm Daniel Joseph Koch (1771–1849), city physician in Trarbach
- Johann Christian August Clarus (1774–1854), city physician in Leipzig
- Dietrich Georg von Kieser (1779–1862), city and county physician in Northeim
- Karl Ernst Büchner (1786–1861), city physician in Darmstadt
- Wilhelm Johann Theodor Mauch (1788–1863), physician of the city and county (Amt) Rendsburg
- Frederik Holst (1791–1871), city physician in Christiania (Oslo)
- Georg Carl Riesenkampff (1793–1835), city physician in Tallinn
- Friedrich Reinhold Kreutzwald (1803–1882), city physician in Võru
- Isak Schlockow (1837–1890), city physician in Wrocław
- Carl Türk (1838–1890), city physician in Lübeck
- Juhan Luiga (1873–1927), city physician in Tallinn

== See also ==
- Archiater
- Barber surgeon
- Plague doctor
