= Nathanael Sendel =

Nathanael Sendel (August 1686 – 1757) was a physician and naturalist who was born and lived most his life in the Polish–Lithuanian Commonwealth. He was among the first to examine the paleontological aspects of Baltic amber. His major work was Historia Succinorum (1742), which described a large collection of Baltic amber and its inclusions (animal or plant material trapped in the amber).

Sendel was born in Elbing (Elbląg), Polish–Lithuanian Commonwealth and after attending the local gymnasium (1691) where his father Samuel was a teacher, he went to Danzig and then to the University of Wittenberg (1709) which at the time was in the Electorate of Saxony. He completed medical studies at the University of Halle (1712). That university was then in the Duchy of Magdeburg which was part of the Kingdom of Prussia. Sendel published Thesium ex Synopsi cum anti-thesibus pugillus in 1708 and in 1709 Dissertatio medico-physica de sapore. His doctoral thesis under Georg Ernst Stahl (1659–1734) was titled De Causis Praecipuis, Effectuum Tragicorum in Medicina. He returned to practice privately in Elbing and became a city physician from 1716. He collected amber and began to interact with scientific societies. Sendel collaborated with Johann Philipp Breyne (1680–1764) who had a great network across Europe and England. Jacob Theodor Klein (1685–1759) from Danzig was another collaborator. Sendel's work on amber was titled Electrologiae per varia tentamina historica ac physica continuandae (1725–1728), which examines the origin of amber and its properties. He also examined the animal inclusions and began to examine collections, including those of others. From the 1720s Sendel was associated with the Dresden amber cabinet which included donations by the Prussian King Friedrich Wilhelm I and he was involved in sorting and cataloguing the collection. A part of his amber collection was sold to the royal collection of Augustus II the Strong in Dresden.

Sendel believed that amber was formed in cracks deep in the earth and rejected the theory that amber came from tree resin. He suggested that insects that crawled into the cracks and crevices of the earth got embedded in the liquid state of the amber. It was in 1757 that Mikhail Vasilyevich Lomonosov (1711–1765) determined that amber was fossil resin. Sendel was elected to the Leopoldina Academy in 1743.

Sendel's major work was the folio volume Historia Succinorum with 13 copperplate engravings by C. F. Boetius (1706–1782) describing 250 amber inclusions, mostly arthropods. He described many fossil "butterflies", which were mostly caddisflies.
