= Philipp Jakob Sachs =

German physician (1627–1672)

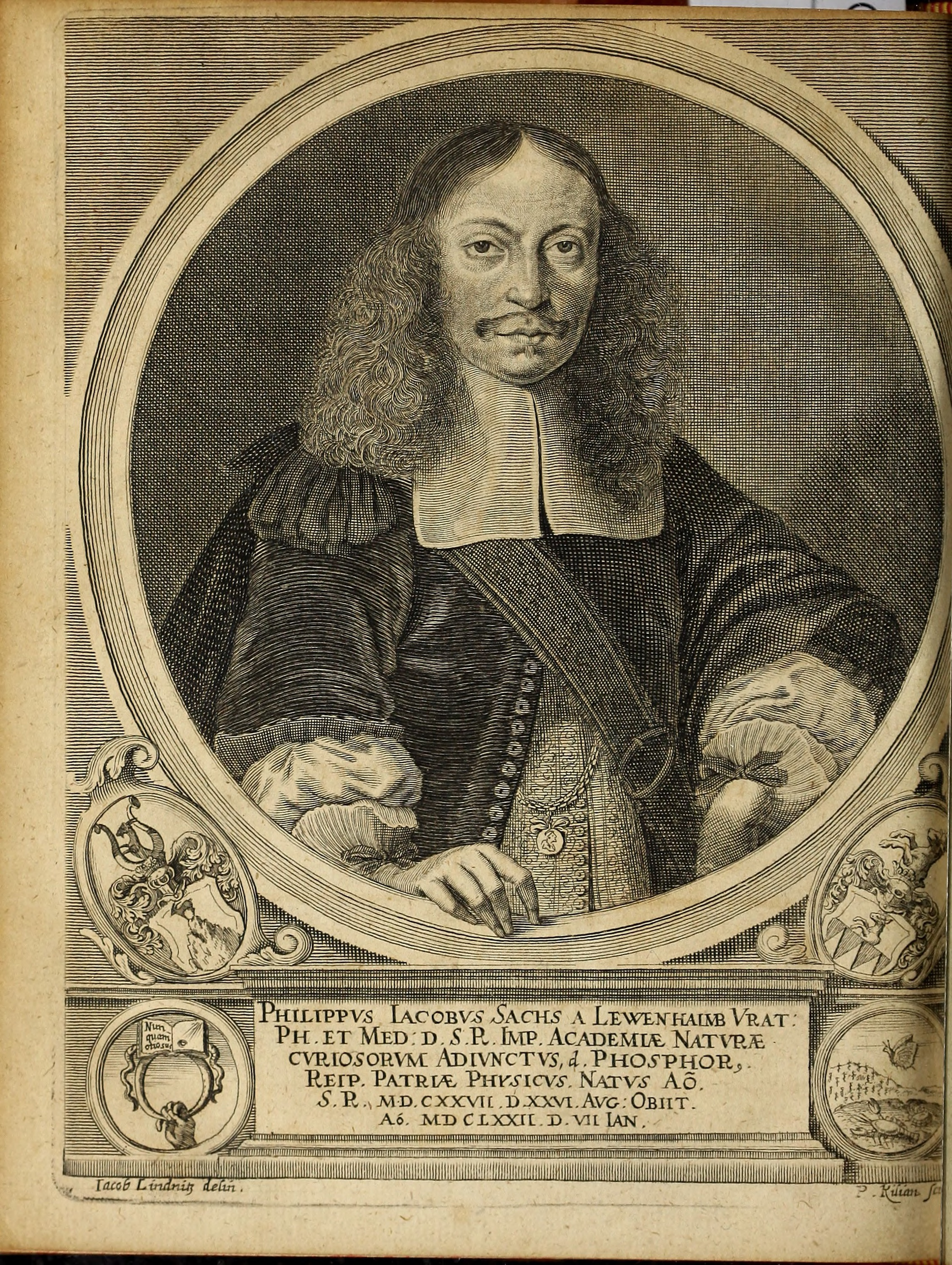
Philipp Jakob Sachs as depicted in Miscellanea Curiosa Medico-Physica Academiae Naturae Curiosorum (1676)

Philipp Jakob Sachs (26 August 1627 – 7 January 1672) was a German physician, naturalist, and editor of Ephemerides Academiae naturae curiosorum, the first ever learned journal in the field of medicine and natural history. Born in Wrocław, he later became a city physician (Stadtphysicus) there, and was one of the founders of the Academia Naturae Curiosorum, today the German National Academy of Sciences Leopoldina.

His works include the 1665 Gammarologia, on crabs.

== Works ==
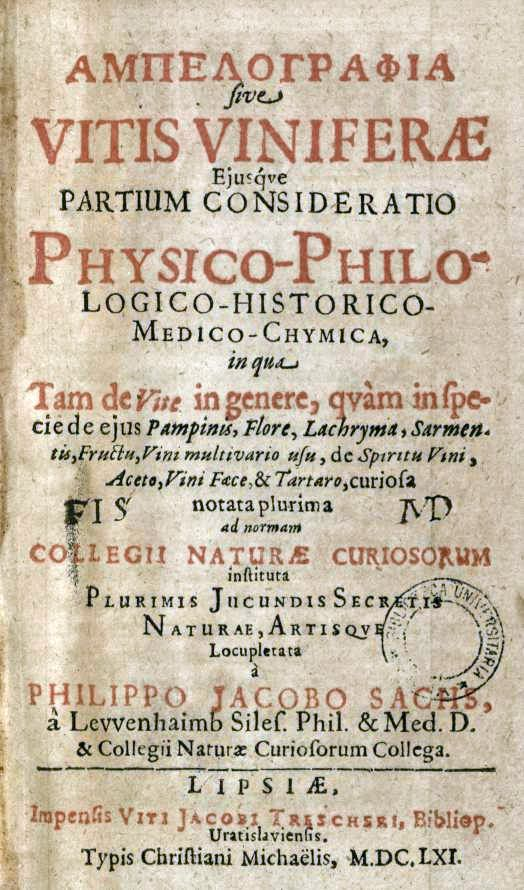
Ampelographia, 1661

- Ampelographia (in Latin). Leipzig: Jacob Trescher. 1661.
