= Calx =

Residual substance, sometimes in the form of a fine powder

Calx is a substance formed from an ore or mineral that has been heated. Calx, especially of a metal, is now understood to be an oxide. The term is also sometimes used in older texts on artists' techniques to mean calcium oxide.

According to the obsolete phlogiston theory, the calx was the true elemental substance that was left after phlogiston was driven out of it in the process of combustion.

== Etymology ==
Calx is Latin for chalk or limestone, from the Greek χάλιξ (khaliks, “pebble”). (It is not to be confused with the Latin homonym meaning heelbone (or calcaneus in modern medical Latin), which has an entirely separate derivation.)
