= Giovanni Antonio Giobert =

Italian chemist and mineralogist

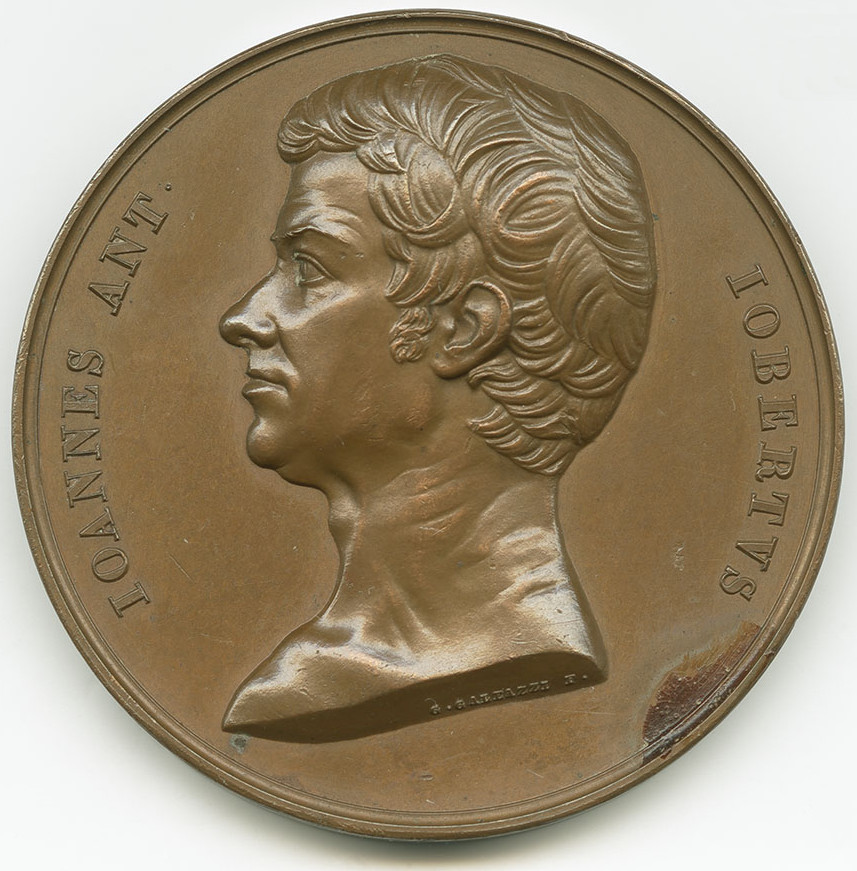
- IOANNES ANT. IOBERTVS, Medal by Gaspare Galeazzi
- Born: 27 October 1761; Mongardino, Italy
- Died: 14 September 1834 (aged 72); Millefiori, Italy
- Scientific career
- Fields: Chemistry
- Workplaces: University of Turin

Giovanni Antonio Giobert (27 October 1761 – 14 September 1834), also known as Jean-Antoine Giobert, was an Italian chemist and mineralogist who studied magnetism, galvanism, and agricultural chemistry. He introduced Antoine Lavoisier's theories to Italy, and built a phosphorus-based eudiometer sufficiently sensitive to measure atmospheric carbon dioxide and oxygen. He identified the correct composition of the mineral Gioberite, a form of magnesite (MgCO3) found in the Piedmont area. He was made a knight (Cavaliere) for his work on the chemistry of indigo dyes.

== Early life ==
Giovanni Antonio Giobert was born on 27 October 1761 in Mongardino near Asti, to Spirito and Anna Gugalin. He was educated by Abbot G. B. Lovizzolo, studying the physical sciences and chemistry, and was apprenticed in pharmacies in Asti and Turin.

== Science ==
In his early twenties, Giobert focused his studies on the application of chemistry in agriculture and industry. He became a member of the Royal Academy of Sciences of Turin in 1789, at age 28. He served as president of the academy, and contributed to a history of the academy. He edited and contributed to a Journal of Arts, Sciences, and Literature, by a Philosophical Society at Turn, writing about marl and other fossil substances.

In 1800 he became Professor of Agriculture and as of 1802 professor of chemistry and mineralogy at the University of Turin. He was involved in the Reale Società Agraria di Torino, the Società Italiana della Scienza in Verona (later in Modena) and other scientific academies. Beginning in 1808 he was a corresponding member of the Bavarian Academy of Sciences.

Giobert was part of a Turin-based Comitato Galvanico that supported the theories of Luigi Galvani against those of Alessandro Volta. Giobert carried out research into the conduction of electricity and the forming of precipitates along a wire in a galvanic apparatus.

Giobert was one of the first to spread Antoine Lavoisier's theories in Italy. He published experimental work in the debate over whether water was a simple element or chemical composition of hydrogen and oxygen. In 1792, his work on the refutation of phlogiston theory won a prize competition on the subject, put forward by the Academy of Letters and Sciences of Mantua in 1790 and 1791. His "Examen chimique de la doctrine du phlogistique et de la doctrine des pneumatistes par rapport à la nature de l 'eau", presented to the Académie royale des Sciences of Turin on 18 March 1792, is considered the most original defense of Lavoisier's theory of water composition to appear in Italy.

Giobert contributed significantly to eudiometry, the study of gas composition, by further developing Lavoisier's eudiometer. Giobert built a phosphorus-based instrument sufficiently sensitive to measure atmospheric carbon dioxide and oxygen. He used it to compare the air quality of Turin with higher altitude Vinadio. A number of other researchers developed variants on his eudiometer, including Spallanzani, Humphry Davy, John Dalton, and Joseph Louis Gay-Lussac. Nicolas-Théodore de Saussure commended it for its accuracy, describing its use in his studies of the roles of water and gases in the nutrition of plants as follows:

In this work, when I have given readings of the phosphorus eudiometer, they have always been cleared of the error that nitrogen gas can introduce through the expansion it undergoes in dissolving the phosphorus… In the first moments of the disappearance of the oxygen gas, the expansion of the nitrogen gas is undetectable… For these experiments I used rapid combustion and the bent tube indicated by Giobert (Analyse des Eaux de Vaudier). I tilt the eudiometer when the phosphorus is melting, so that the phosphorus flows and spreads over the full length of the tube. With this procedure, the analysis of air is completed in less than half an hour, and at this time needs no correction.

Among his many experiments Giobert examined a Piedmontese mineral that he correctly identified as a specific form of magnesium carbonate (MgCO_{3}). The Piedmontese variety of magnesite is sometimes referred to as Gioberite, distinguishing it from other forms. It was named after Giobert by François Sulpice Beudant. Identifying its composition was an important contribution to the industry of pottery-making. Giobert also investigated the influence of magnesia on plant growth and found that the presence of earths of silica, lime, alumina and magnesia in the soil was not sufficient for plant growth. This work was important to Saussure and others studying plant growth.

In 1790, the University of Turin established the Deputazione per la Tinture, an ambitious project whose goals included the study of dye plants, the review of dyeing processes, cataloguing of dyestuffs and establishing a library, improving artisan skills, working with foreign dyers and chemists, and using new chemicals and instruments to improve the state of the art in Piedmont. An imperial decree in 1810 encouraged the improvement of scientific and industrial techniques for using woad. Giobert was active as a chemical advisor and made important contributions to the dyeing industry, studying the chemistry of natural dyes including woad, indigo, and turkey red. For example, Giobert suggested that uneven bleaching of cotton with alkaline lye was a cause of variable color-fastness when the cloth was dyed. He helped to identify differences between animal- and plant-based dyes, and developed techniques for "animalizing" fibres with nitrogen gas to improve the solidity of the dye. Such techniques became widespread throughout the European dyeing industry. In 1811 Giobert worked with Raymond Latour on the development of blue dyes which became widely used. In 1813, Giobert was appointed director of the École impériale pour la fabrication de l'indigo in Turin, which was established to study industrial processing of indigo. Giobert identified a colorless form of indigo (sometimes called indigogen or 'white' indigo) in plants, convertible to indigo-blue through oxidation. For his work on the indigo color dyeing method, Giobert was made a knight (Cavaliere).

Giobert also developed the Gioberti tincture, which involved application of hydrochloric acid and potassium ferrocyanide. The Gioberti tincture was used in the 19th century and early 20th century to restore illegible writings or faded pictures, before less harsh chemical reagents were found. Gioberti tincture was used to show the original inscriptions of palimpsests by conservators at the Vatican.

== Politics ==
The period in which Giobert was active was one of considerable political upheaval. The University of Turin was closed in both 1797 and 1799 due to political events. Giobert was a francophile and a strong republican supporter of Napoleon. In 1798 he was appointed to the provisional government of Piedmont (Il Governo Provvisorio della Nazione Piemontese), only to be imprisoned in 1799 when the Austrians briefly took power. Following his release, he became a professor at the University of Turin. In 1814, after the restoration of King Victor Emmanuel I, Giobert was one of nine professors removed from their teaching positions in Turin due to their political involvement.

== Memorials ==
Giobert died on 14 September 1834 in Millefiori near Turin.

He is remembered by the town of Asti, which named a street in his honor in 1868, and established the Istituto Giobert di Asti in 1882. He was also honored by the town of Mongardino which named the Scuola Elementare Giobert di Mongardino in his honor. Scholars continue to study his life and work. A bust of Giobert was unveiled at the “Giobert: da Mongardino alla nuova chimica” conference in Mongardino on October 20, 2013.

== Selected works ==
- Dissertazione sopra il quesito: Verificare con più accertati mezzi chimici, se l'aqua sia un corpo composto di diversi arie ... oppure sia un vero elemento simplice, etc. (Dissertation on the question: Verify with more established chemical means, if the water is a body composed of different components ... or it is a real simple element, etc.). Mantova (Mantua). 1794.
- Raccolta di memorie spettanti all' agricoltura [microform] : economia di casa, commercio, arti, e manifatture (Collection of Memories Affecting Agriculture [microform]: Home Economics, Commerce, Arts, and Manufacturing). Torino (Turin): Presso Costanzo, e Fenoglio. 1791.
- "Ueber einige galvanische Versuche von Giobert. Aus einem Briefe desselben an van Mons. (On some galvanic experiments by Giobert. From a letter to van Mons.)". Neues Allgemeines Journal der Chemie. 3 (2). Frölich, Berlin: 219. 1804.
- Traité sur le pastel et l'extraction de son Indigo. Paris: Imprimerie impériale. 1813.
- Nachricht für die Einwohner des Ober-Ems-Departements über den Anbau und die Benutzung des Waid; ein Auszug aus dem in diesem Jahre in Paris erschienenen Werke: "Traité sur le Pastel et l'extraction de son Indigo" (News for the inhabitants of the Upper Ems Department on the cultivation and use of the woad; an extract from the work published this year in Paris: "Traité sur le Pastel et l'extraction de son Indigo".). Osnabrück: R. Koch. 1813.
- Del sovescio di segale di G.A. Giobert lettere dilucidative e comenti. Turin: Gaetano Balbino. 1819.
- Des Eaux thermales et acidules de l'Échaillon en Maurienne. Essai. Turin: Pomba et Fils. 1822.
- De l'écorce du robinier (Robinia pseudo-acacia L.), et de ses usages dans les arts et l'économie domestique (From the bark of the Robinia pseudo-acacia L.; its uses in the arts and domestic economy). Mme Huzard (Huzard née Vallat la Chapelle). 1833.
