= Phlogiston theory =

Superseded theory of combustion

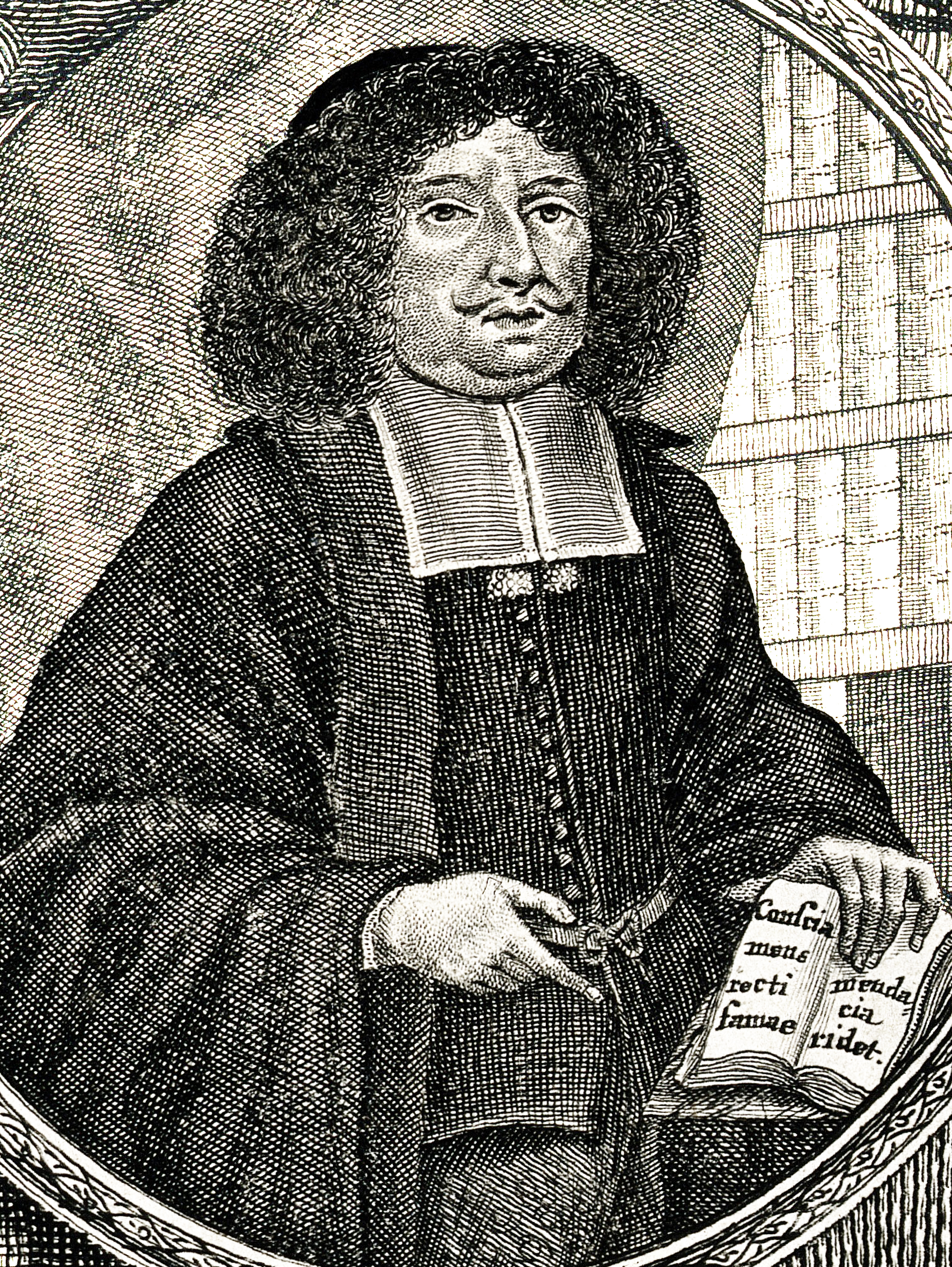
The alchemist and physician J. J. Becher proposed the phlogiston theory.

The phlogiston theory, a superseded scientific theory, postulated the existence of a fire-like element dubbed phlogiston (/flɒˈdʒɪstən, floʊ-, -ɒn/) contained within combustible bodies and released during combustion. The name comes from the Ancient Greek φλογιστόν phlogistón (burning up), from φλόξ phlóx (flame). The idea of a phlogistic substance was first proposed in 1669 by Johann Joachim Becher and later put together more formally in 1697 by Georg Ernst Stahl.

Phlogiston theory attempted to explain chemical processes such as combustion and rusting, now collectively known as oxidation. The theory was challenged by the concomitant mass increase and was abandoned before the end of the 18th century following experiments by Antoine Lavoisier in the 1770s and by other scientists. Phlogiston theory led to experiments that ultimately resulted in the identification (c. 1771), and naming (1777), of oxygen by Joseph Priestley and Antoine Lavoisier, respectively.

== Theory ==
Phlogiston theory states that phlogisticated substances contain phlogiston and that they dephlogisticate when burned, releasing stored phlogiston, which is absorbed by the air. Growing plants then absorb this phlogiston, which is why air does not spontaneously combust and also why plant matter burns. This method of accounting for combustion was inverse to the oxygen theory by Antoine Lavoisier.

In general, substances that burned in the air were said to be rich in phlogiston; the fact that combustion soon ceased in an enclosed space was taken as clear-cut evidence that air had the capacity to absorb only a finite amount of phlogiston. When the air had become completely phlogisticated it would no longer serve to support the combustion of any material, nor would a metal heated in it yield a calx; nor could phlogisticated air support life. Breathing was thought to take phlogiston out of the body.

Joseph Black's Scottish student Daniel Rutherford discovered nitrogen in 1772, and the pair used the theory to explain his results. The residue of air left after burning, a mixture of nitrogen and carbon dioxide, was sometimes referred to as phlogisticated air, having taken up all of the phlogiston. Conversely, when Joseph Priestley discovered oxygen, he believed it to be dephlogisticated air, capable of combining with more phlogiston and thus supporting combustion for longer than ordinary air.

== History ==
Empedocles had formulated the classical theory that there were four elements—water, earth, fire, and air—and Aristotle reinforced this idea by characterising them as moist, dry, hot, and cold. Fire was thus thought of as a substance, and burning was seen as a process of decomposition that applied only to compounds. Experience had shown that burning was not always accompanied by a loss of material, and a better theory was needed to account for this.

=== Terra pinguis ===
In 1667, Johann Joachim Becher published his book Physica subterranea, which contained the first instance of what would become the phlogiston theory. In his book, Becher eliminated fire and air from the classical element model and replaced them with three forms of the earth: terra lapidea, terra fluida, and terra pinguis. Terra pinguis was the element that imparted oily, sulfurous, or combustible properties. Becher believed that terra pinguis was a key feature of combustion and was released when combustible substances were burned. Becher did not have much to do with phlogiston theory as it is known now, but he had a large influence on his student Stahl. Becher's main contribution was the start of the theory itself, however much of it was changed after him. Becher's idea was that combustible substances contain an ignitable matter, the terra pinguis.

=== Georg Ernst Stahl ===
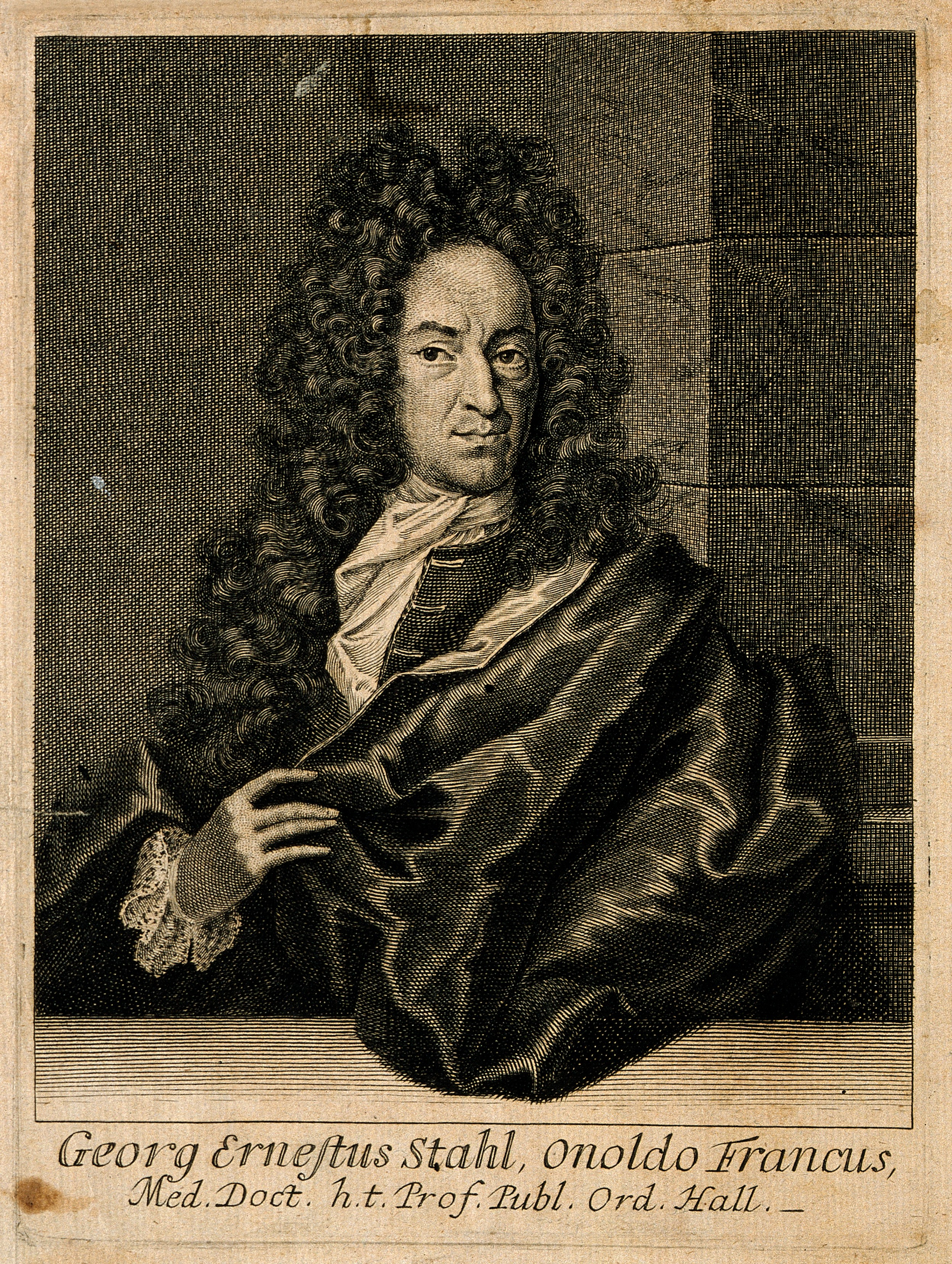
Georg Ernst Stahl

In 1703, Georg Ernst Stahl, a professor of medicine and chemistry at Halle, proposed a variant of the theory in which he renamed Becher's terra pinguis to phlogiston, and it was in this form that the theory probably had its greatest influence. The term 'phlogiston' itself was not something that Stahl invented. There is evidence that the word was used as early as 1606, and in a way that was very similar to what Stahl was using it for. The term was derived from a Greek word meaning inflame. The following paragraph describes Stahl's view of phlogiston:

To Stahl, metals were compounds containing phlogiston in combination with metallic oxides (calces); when ignited, the phlogiston was freed from the metal leaving the oxide behind. When the oxide was heated with a substance rich in phlogiston, such as charcoal, the calx again took up phlogiston and regenerated the metal. Phlogiston was a definite substance, the same in all its combinations.

Stahl's first definition of phlogiston first appeared in his Zymotechnia fundamentalis, published in 1697. His most quoted definition was found in the treatise on chemistry entitled Fundamenta chymiae in 1723. According to Stahl, phlogiston was a substance that was not able to be put into a bottle but could be transferred nonetheless. To him, wood was just a combination of ash and phlogiston, and making a metal was as simple as getting a metal calx and adding phlogiston. Soot was almost pure phlogiston, which is why heating it with a metallic calx transforms the calx into the metal and Stahl attempted to prove that the phlogiston in soot and sulfur were identical by converting sulfates to liver of sulfur using charcoal. He did not account for the increase in mass on combustion of tin and lead that were known at the time.

=== J. H. Pott ===
Johann Heinrich Pott, a student of Stahl, expanded the theory and attempted to make it much more understandable to a general audience. He compared phlogiston to light or fire, saying that all three were substances whose natures were widely understood but not easily defined. He thought that phlogiston should not be considered as a particle but as an essence that permeates substances, arguing that in a pound of any substance, one could not simply pick out the particles of phlogiston. Pott also observed the fact that when certain substances are burned they increase in mass instead of losing the mass of the phlogiston as it escapes; according to him, phlogiston was the basic fire principle and could not be obtained by itself. Flames were considered to be a mix of phlogiston and water, while a phlogiston-and-earthy mixture could not burn properly. Phlogiston permeates everything in the universe, it could be released as heat when combined with an acid. Pott proposed the following properties:

1. The form of phlogiston consists of a circular movement around its axis.
2. When homogeneous it cannot be consumed or dissipated in a fire.
3. The reason it causes expansion in most bodies is unknown, but not accidental. It is proportional to the compactness of the texture of the bodies or to the intimacy of their constitution.
4. The increase of mass during calcination is evident only after a long time, and is due either to the fact that the particles of the body become more compact, decrease the volume and hence increase the density as in the case of lead, or those little heavy particles of air become lodged in the substance as in the case of powdered zinc oxide.
5. Air attracts the phlogiston of bodies.
6. When set in motion, phlogiston is the chief active principle in nature of all inanimate bodies.
7. It is the basis of colours.
8. It is the principal agent in fermentation.

Pott's formulations proposed little new theory; he merely supplied further details and rendered existing theory more approachable to the common man.

=== Others ===
Torbern Bergman's alchemical symbol for phlogiston

Johann Juncker also created a very complete picture of phlogiston. When reading Stahl's work, he assumed that phlogiston was in fact very material. He, therefore, came to the conclusion that phlogiston has the property of levity, i.e., that it makes the compound that it is in much lighter than it would be without the phlogiston. He also showed that air was needed for combustion by putting substances in a sealed flask and trying to burn them.

Guillaume-François Rouelle brought the theory of phlogiston to France, where he was an influential scientist and teacher, popularizing the theory very quickly. Many of his students became influential scientists in their own right, Lavoisier included. The French viewed phlogiston as a very subtle principle that vanishes in all analysis, yet it is in all bodies. Essentially they followed straight from Stahl's theory.

Giovanni Antonio Giobert introduced Lavoisier's work in Italy. Giobert won a prize competition from the Academy of Letters and Sciences of Mantua in 1792 for his work refuting phlogiston theory. He presented a paper at the Académie royale des Sciences of Turin on 18 March 1792, entitled Examen chimique de la doctrine du phlogistique et de la doctrine des pneumatistes par rapport à la nature de l'eau ("Chemical examination of the doctrine of phlogiston and the doctrine of pneumatists in relation to the nature of water"), which is considered the most original defence of Lavoisier's theory of water composition to appear in Italy.

== Challenge and demise ==
Eventually, quantitative experiments revealed problems, including the fact that some metals gained mass after they burned, even though they were supposed to have lost phlogiston. Some phlogiston proponents, like Robert Boyle, explained this by concluding that phlogiston has negative mass; others, such as Louis-Bernard Guyton de Morveau, gave the more conventional argument that it is lighter than air. However, a more detailed analysis based on Archimedes' principle, the densities of magnesium and its combustion product showed that just being lighter than air could not account for the increase in mass. Stahl himself did not address the problem of the metals that burn gaining mass, but those who followed his school of thought worked on this problem.

During the eighteenth century, as it became clear that metals gained mass after they were oxidized, phlogiston was increasingly regarded as a principle rather than a material substance. By the end of the eighteenth century, for the few chemists who still used the term phlogiston, the concept was linked to hydrogen. Joseph Priestley, for example, in referring to the reaction of steam on iron, while fully acknowledging that the iron gains mass after it binds with oxygen to form a calx, iron oxide, iron also loses "the basis of inflammable air (hydrogen), and this is the substance or principle, to which we give the name phlogiston". Following Lavoisier's description of oxygen as the oxidizing principle (hence its name, from Ancient Greek: oksús, "sharp"; génos, "birth" referring to oxygen's supposed role in the formation of acids), Priestley described phlogiston as the alkaline principle.

Phlogiston remained the dominant theory until the 1770s when Antoine-Laurent de Lavoisier showed that combustion requires a gas that has mass (specifically, oxygen) and could be measured by means of weighing closed vessels. The use of closed vessels by Lavoisier and earlier by the Russian scientist Mikhail Lomonosov also negated the buoyancy that had disguised the mass of the gases of combustion, and culminated in the principle of mass conservation. These observations solved the mass paradox and set the stage for the new oxygen theory of combustion. The British chemist Elizabeth Fulhame demonstrated through experiment that many oxidation reactions occur only in the presence of water, that they directly involve water, and that water is regenerated and is detectable at the end of the reaction. Based on her experiments, she disagreed with some of the conclusions of Lavoisier as well as with the phlogiston theorists that he critiqued. Her book on the subject appeared in print soon after Lavoisier's execution for Farm-General membership during the French Revolution.

Experienced chemists who supported Stahl's phlogiston theory attempted to respond to the challenges suggested by Lavoisier and the newer chemists. In doing so, the theory became more complicated and assumed too much, contributing to its overall demise. Many people tried to remodel their theories on phlogiston to have the theory work with what Lavoisier was doing in his experiments. Pierre Macquer reworded his theory many times, and even though he is said to have thought the theory of phlogiston was doomed, he stood by phlogiston and tried to make the theory work.

== See also ==
- Caloric theory – Obsolete scientific theory of heat flow
- Pneumatic chemistry – Area of scientific research
- Electronegativity – Tendency of an atom to attract a shared pair of electrons
- Energeticism – View that energy is the fundamental element in all physical change
- Antiphlogistine – Topical pain relief medicine
