= Johann Heinrich Pott =

Prussian physician and chemist

Johann Heinrich Pott (6 October 1692 – 29 March 1777) was a Prussian physician, chemist, and a glass and porcelain technologist. He is considered a pioneer of pyrochemistry. He examined the elements bismuth and manganese apart from attempting improvements to glass and porcelain production.

== Biography ==
Pott was born in Halberstadt, son of the royal councillor Johann Andreas Pott (1662–1729) and Dorothea Sophia daughter of Andreas Machenau. He studied at the cathedral school in Halberstadt and Francke's pedagogium before studying theology at the University of Halle. He then shifted to study medicine and chemistry under Georg Ernst Stahl. In 1713 he studied assaying at Mansfield under mining master Lages. He spent two years along with two of his brothers as travelling evangelists for the Community of True Inspiration but he left the sect in 1715 and returned to study chemistry at Halle, receiving a doctorate in 1716 on sulfur under Friedrich Hoffmann. He worked as a physician in Halberstadt before moving to Berlin in 1720 and became a professor of chemistry at the Collegium Medico Chirurgicum in 1724. Like his mentor Stahl, he was a promoter of the phlogiston theory. He succeeded Caspar Neumann (1683–1737) as professor of pharmaceutical chemistry. In 1753 he attempted to get his son-in-law Ernst Gottfried Kurella into a professorship and clashed publicly with Johann Theodor Eller whose student Brandes took the position. Pott's chemistry contributions included the use of borax and phosphorus beads in analysis. He examined graphite which he differentiated from the contemporary idea that it was lead. Pott established a porcelain factory in Freienwalde under the orders of Frederick II. He examined the composition of pyrolusite.

Pott married the daughter of businessman Stanislaus Rücker.

== Publications ==
- Exercitationes chymicae (1738)
- Dissertations Chymiques (1759) Volume 1 Volume 2 Volume 3
- Collectiones observationum et animadversionum chymicarum, 1739 and 1741
- Lithogeognosia (1746–57)
