= Johann Joachim Becher =

German physician (1635–1682)

Johann Becher
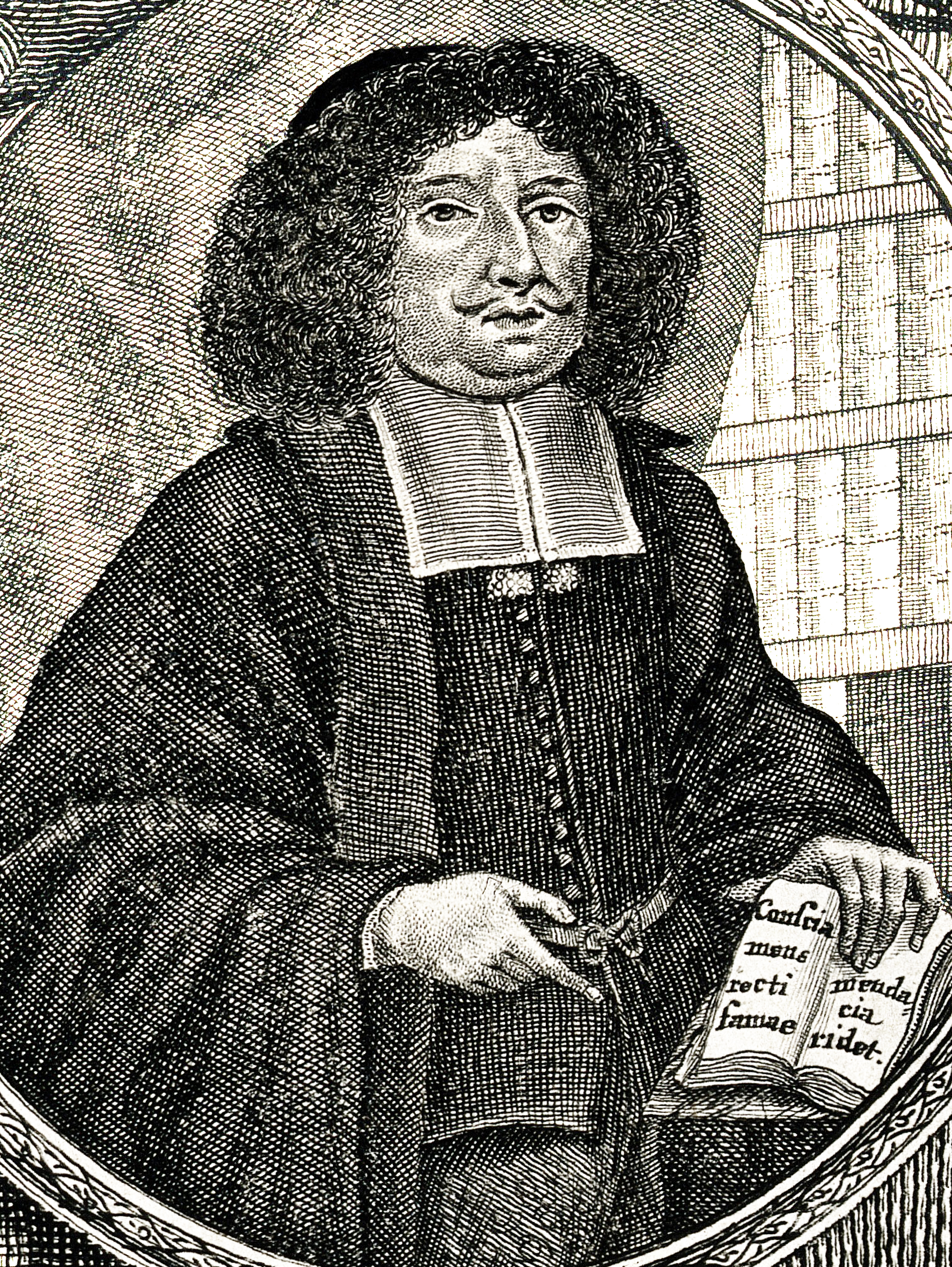
- Born: 6 May 1635; Speyer, Holy Roman Empire
- Died: October 1682 (aged 47); London, England
- Known for: Phlogiston theory
- Scientific career
- Fields: Chemistry, alchemy

Johann Joachim Becher (German: [ˈbɛçɐ]; 6 May 1635 – October 1682) was a German physician, alchemist, precursor of chemistry, scholar, polymath and adventurer, best known for his terra pinguis theory which became the phlogiston theory of combustion, and his advancement of Austrian cameralism.

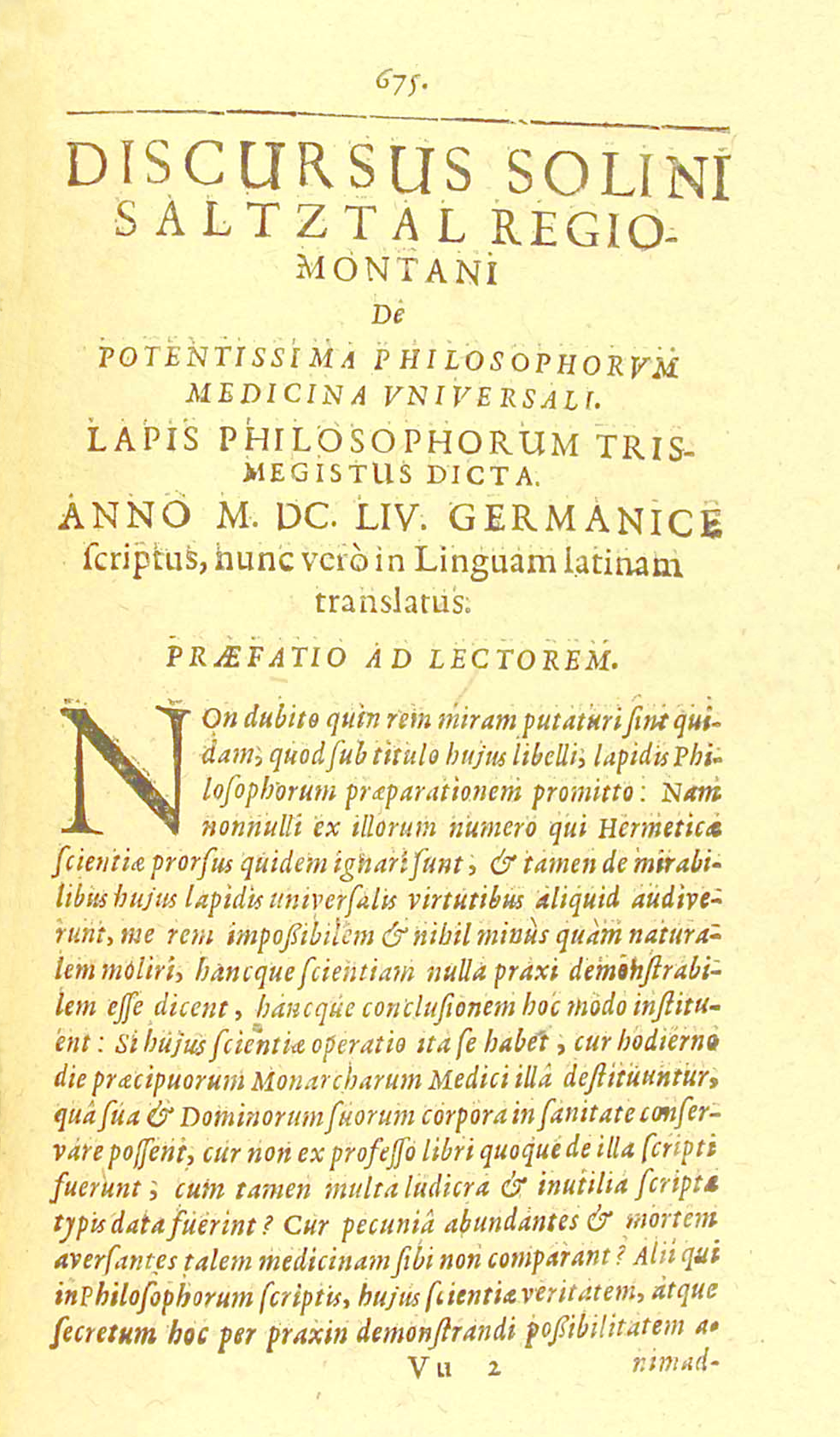
Page of Theatrum Chemicum Volume VI (1659), showing the first page of 'Discursus Solini Saltztal Regiomontani De potentissima philosophorum medicina universali, lapis philosophorum trismegistus dicta.'

== Early life and education ==
Becher was born in Speyer during the Thirty Years War. His father was a Lutheran minister and died when Becher was a child. At the age of thirteen Becher found himself responsible not only for his own support but also for that of his mother and two brothers. He learned and practiced several small handicrafts, devoted his nights to study of the most miscellaneous description and earned a pittance by teaching.

In 1654, at the age of nineteen, he published the Discurs von der Großmächtigen Philosophischen Universal-Artzney / von den Philosophis genannt Lapis Philosophorum Trismegistus (discourse about the almighty philosophical and universal medicine by the philosopher called Lapis Philosophorum Trismegistus) under the pseudonym 'Solinus Salzthal of Regiomontus.' It was published in Latin in 1659 as Discursus Solini Saltztal Regiomontani De potentissima philosophorum medicina universali, lapis philosophorum trismegistus dicta (translated by Johannes Jacobus Heilmann) in vol. VI of the Theatrum Chemicum.

== Career ==
In 1657, he was appointed professor of medicine at the University of Mainz and physician to the archbishop-elector. His Metallurgia was published in 1660; and the next year appeared his Character pro notitia linguarum universali, in which he gives 10,000 words for use as a universal language. In 1663, he published his Oedipum Chemicum and a book on animals, plants and minerals (Thier- Kräuter- und Bergbuch).

In 1666, he was made councillor of commerce (German: Commerzienrat) at Vienna, where he had gained the powerful support of the prime minister of Emperor Leopold I. Sent by the emperor on a mission to the Netherlands, he wrote there in ten days his Methodus Didactica, which was followed by the Regeln der Christlichen Bundesgenossenschaft and the Politischer Discurs von den eigentlichen Ursachen des Auf- und Abblühens der Städte, Länder und Republiken. In 1669, he published his Physica subterranea; the same year, he was engaged with the count of Hanau in a scheme to acquire Dutch colonization of Guiana from the Dutch West India Company.

Meanwhile, he had been appointed physician to the elector of Bavaria; but in 1670 he was again in Vienna advising on the establishment of a silk factory and propounding schemes for a great company to trade with the Low Countries and for a canal to unite the Rhine and Danube.

In 1678, he crossed to England. He travelled to Scotland where he visited the mines at the request of Prince Rupert. He afterwards travelled for the same purpose to Cornwall, and spent a year there. At the beginning of 1680, he presented a paper to the Royal Society in which he attempted to deprive Christiaan Huygens of the honour of applying the pendulum to the measurement of time. In 1682, he returned to London, where he wrote Närrische Weisheit und weise Narrheit (in which, according to Otto Mayr he made extensive references to temperature regulated furnaces), a book the Chymischer Glücks-Hafen, Oder Grosse Chymische Concordantz Und Collection, Von funffzehen hundert Chymischen Processen and died in October of the same year.

== Legacy ==
=== Austrian Cameralist ===
Becher was the most original and influential theorist of Austrian cameralism. He sought to balance between the need to reinstate postwar levels of population and production both in the countryside and the towns. By leaning more seriously on trade and commerce, Austrian cameralism helped to transfer attention to the troubles of the monarchy's urban economies. Ferdinand II had already taken some corrective steps before he died by attempting to ease the debts of the Bohemian towns and to put limits on some of the land-holding nobility's commercial rights. Even though preceding Habsburgs had held the guilds responsible for their restrictiveness, wastefulness, and the poor value of the merchandise they created, Ferdinand II ramped up the pressure by extending rights to private artisans who usually then earned the support of powerful local leaders such as seigneurs, military commanders, churches, and universities. An edict by Leopold I in 1689 had granted the government the right to monitor and control the number of masters and cut down on the monopoly effect of guild operations. Even previous to this, Becher, who was against all forms of monopoly, surmised that a third of the Austrian lands’ 150,000 artisans were "Schwarzarbeiter" who were not in a guild.

Immediately after the Thirty Years’ War the Bohemian towns had petitioned Ferdinand to refine its own raw materials into more finished goods for export. Becher became the leading force in attempting this conversion. By 1666 he had inspired the creation of a Commerce Commission (Kommerzkollegium) in Vienna, as well as the reestablishment of the first postwar silk plantation on the Lower Austrian estates of Hofkammer President Sinzendorf. Becher then subsequently helped create a Kunst- und Werkhaus in which foreign masters trained non-guild artisans in the production of finished goods. By 1672 he had promoted the construction of a wool factory in Linz. Four years later he established a textile workhouse for vagabonds in the Boemian town of Tabor that eventually employed 186 spinners under his own directorship.

Some of Becher’s projects met with limited success. In time Linz’s new wool factory even became one of the largest and most important in Europe. Yet most of the government initiatives ended in failure. The Commerce Commission was doomed by Sinzendorf’s corruption and indifference. The Tabor workhouse nearly collapsed after just five years owing to the lack of government funding, and was then destroyed two years later during the Turkish invasion. The Oriental Company was fatally handicapped by a combination of poor management, government export prohibitions against Turkey, the opposition of Ottoman (principally Greek) merchants, and ultimately by the outbreak of war. The Kunst- und Werkhaus also folded during the 1680s, partly because of the regime’s unwillingness to import a significant number of foreign, Protestant teachers and skilled workers.

=== Chemist and alchemist ===
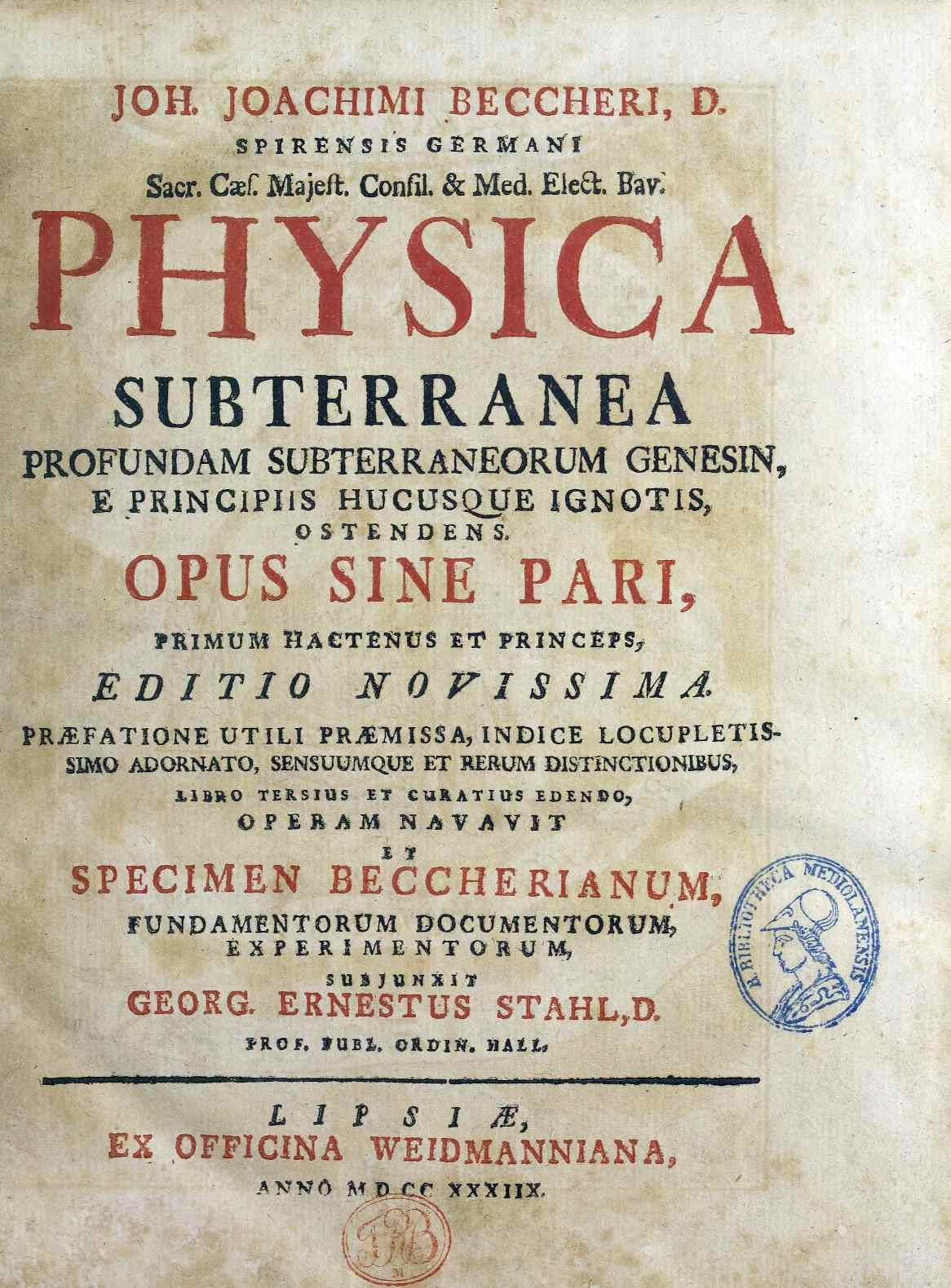
Physica subterranea, 1738 edition

William Cullen considered Becher as a chemist of first importance and Physica Subterranea as the most considerable of Bechers writings.

Bill Bryson, in his A Short History of Nearly Everything, notes:

Chemistry as an earnest and respectable science is often said to date from 1661, when Robert Boyle of Oxford published The Sceptical Chymist — the first work to distinguish between chemists and alchemists — but it was a slow and often erratic transition. Into the eighteenth century scholars could feel oddly comfortable in both camps — like the German Johann Becher, who produced sober and unexceptionable work on mineralogy called Physica Subterranea, but who also was certain that, given the right materials, he could make himself invisible.

In Becher's Physica Subterranea, he proposes a model of matter based on Paracelsus's tria prima (salt, mercury, sulphur). He proposes that all matter is composed of air, water and three earths: terra lapidea related to the fusibility, terra fluida related to the fluidity and volatility, and terra pinguis related to the combustibility and flammability. According to Becher, flammable objects burned because they contained terra pinguis. Even metals had a bit of terra pinguis, observed in the process of calcination. The concept of terra pinguis was later developed by Georg Ernst Stahl into phlogiston theory.

== Sources ==
- Smith, Pamela H. (1994). The Business of Alchemy: Science and Culture in the Holy Roman Empire. Princeton: Princeton University Press.
- Ingrao, Charles W. (2005). The Habsburg Monarchy: 1618–1815. New York: Cambridge University Press.
