= Hilaire Rouelle =

French chemist (1718–1779)

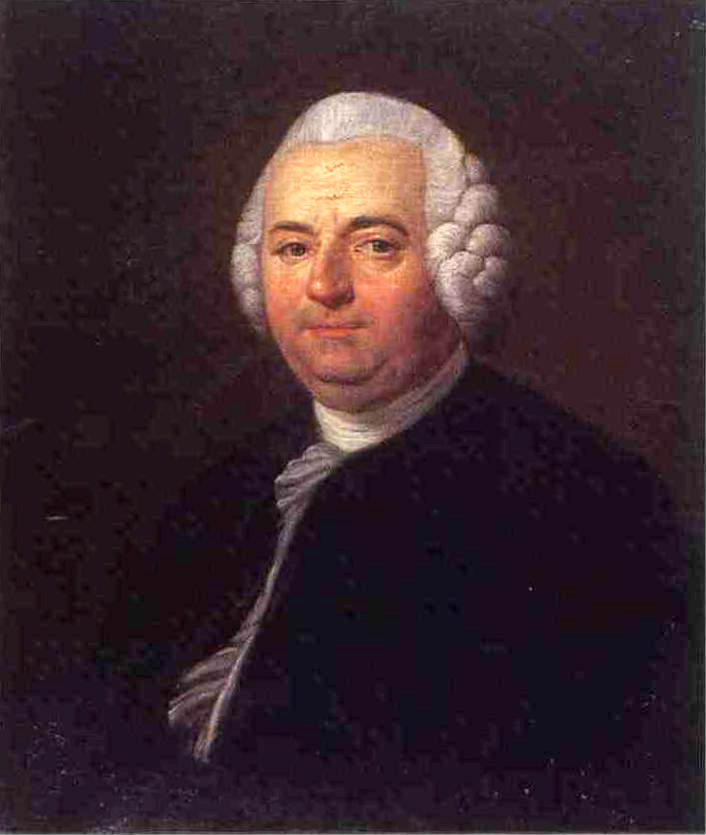
- Born: 15 February 1718; Mathieu, Kingdom of France
- Died: 7 April 1779 (aged 61); Paris, Kingdom of France
- Occupation: Chemist

Hilaire Marin Rouelle (French pronunciation: [ilɛʁ maʁɛ̃ ʁwɛl]; 15 February 1718 – 7 April 1779) was an 18th-century French chemist. Commonly cited as the 1773 discoverer of urea, he was not the first to do so. Dutch scientist Herman Boerhaave had discovered this chemical as early as 1727. Rouelle is known as "le cadet" (the younger) to distinguish him from his older brother, Guillaume-François Rouelle, who was also a chemist.
