= Guillaume-François Rouelle =

French chemist and apothecary (1703–1770)

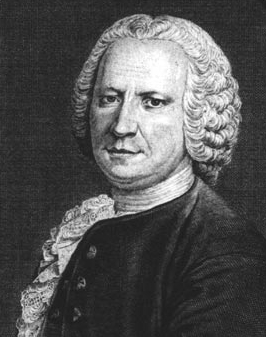
- Born: 15 September 1703; Mathieu, Province of Normandy, Kingdom of France
- Died: 3 August 1770 (aged 66); Paris, Kingdom of France
- Known for: Base
- Scientific career
- Fields: Chemistry

Guillaume François Rouelle (French pronunciation: [ɡijom fʁɑ̃swa ʁwɛl]; 15 September 1703 – 3 August 1770) was a French chemist and apothecary. In 1754 he introduced the concept of a base into chemistry as a substance which reacts with an acid to form a salt.

He is known as l'Aîné (the elder) to distinguish him from his younger brother, Hilaire Rouelle, who was also a chemist and known as the discoverer of urea.

Rouelle started as an apothecary. He later started a public course in his laboratory in 1738, in 1742 he was appointed experimental demonstrator of chemistry at the Jardin du Roi in Paris. he was especially influential and popular as a teacher, and taught many students among whom were Denis Diderot, Antoine-Laurent de Lavoisier, Joseph Proust and Antoine-Augustin Parmentier.

He was elected a foreign member of the Royal Swedish Academy of Sciences in 1749.

In addition to his investigation of neutral salts, he published papers on the inflammation of turpentine and other essential oils by nitric acid, and the methods of embalming practised in Ancient Egypt.

== Why bases for neutral salts were called bases ==
The modern meaning of the word "base" and its general introduction into the chemical vocabulary are usually attributed to Rouelle, who used the term "Base" in a memoir on salts written in 1754 (see The Origin of the Term "Base" by William B. Jensen). In this paper, which was an extension of an earlier memoir on the same subject written in 1744, Rouelle pointed out that the number of known salts had increased significantly during the 17th and early 18th centuries. This was due not only to the preparation of new salts, but also to an increasing ability to distinguish between sodium and potassium compounds, and to a generalization of the concept so as to include many substances, such as the alums and vitriols (i.e., sulfates), that had been previously excluded. In order to incorporate this extended concept of salt formation, Rouelle explicitly defined a neutral salt as the product formed by the union of an acid with any substance, be it a water-soluble alkali, a volatile alkali, an absorbent earth, a metal, or an oil, capable of serving as "a base" for the salt "by giving it a concrete or solid form".
