= Operation Bluecoat =

British offensive in the 1944 Battle of Normandy

- Part of Operation Overlord, the Battle of Normandy
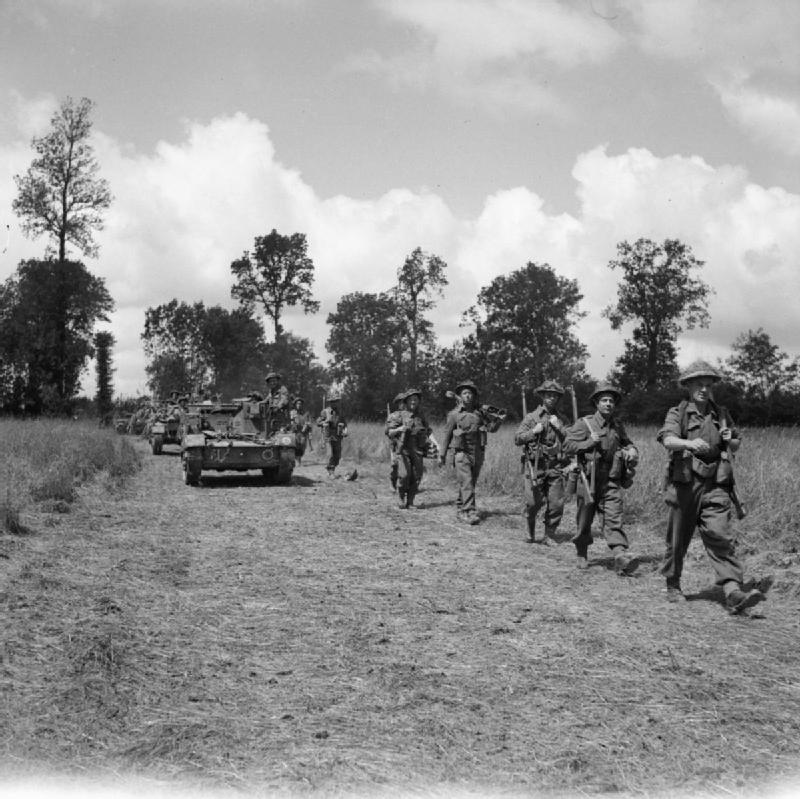
- Universal Carriers and infantry of the 15th (Scottish) Infantry Division move forward during Operation Bluecoat, 30 July 1944.
Date	30 July – 7 August 1944
Location	Normandy, France 48°50′34″N 0°53′32″W
Result	Allied victory

Belligerents
United Kingdom	Germany

Commanders and leaders
(United Kingdom) Miles Dempsey	(Nazi Germany) Paul Hausser

Strength
3 armoured divisions 3 infantry divisions 2 armoured brigades (over 700 tanks)	rising to: 4 panzer divisions 2 infantry divisions

Casualties and losses
5,114 (VIII Corps only); 246 tanks (excluding light casualties)	+100 tanks (including light casualties)

Operation Bluecoat was a British offensive in the Battle of Normandy, from 30 July until 7 August 1944, during the Second World War. The geographical objectives of the attack, undertaken by VIII Corps and XXX Corps of the British Second Army (Lieutenant-General Miles Dempsey), were to secure the road junction of Vire and the high ground of Mont Pinçon.

The attack was made at short notice to exploit the success of Operation Cobra by the First US Army after it broke out on the western flank of the Normandy beachhead and to exploit the withdrawal of the 2nd Panzer Division from the Caumont area, to take part in Unternehmen Lüttich (Operation Liège) a German counter-offensive against the Americans.

== Background ==
From 18 to 20 July, the British Second Army conducted Operation Goodwood on the eastern flank of the Allied beachhead south-east of Caen, in a southerly direction, which had forced the Germans to keep the bulk of their armoured units in the east around Caen. After Goodwood, Ultra revealed that the Germans planned to withdraw the 21st Panzer Division into reserve, before moving to the west (American) sector of the front. On 25 July, after a false start the day before, the First US Army began Operation Cobra.

== Prelude ==
=== Allied preparations ===
The boundary between the British Second Army (Lieutenant-General Sir Miles Dempsey) and the US First Army was moved, the British taking over from the V US Corps, against which were lightly armed but well dug in German infantry, an opportunity for a new operation to keep tying down German armour. The VIII Corps headquarters and the 7th, 11th and Guards Armoured divisions were moved westwards towards Caumont on the western flank of XXX Corps. Dempsey planned to attack on 2 August but the speed of events forced him to advance the date.

=== German preparations ===
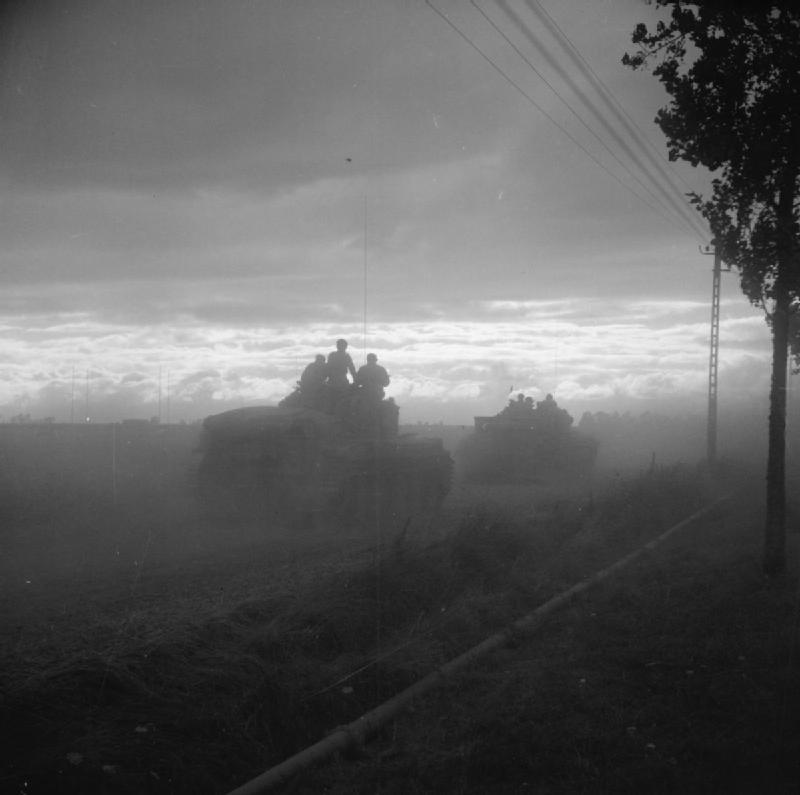
Cromwell tanks of the 7th Armoured Division move up in the morning of 30 July 1944

From 21 July the 2nd Panzer Division had been withdrawn from the area south of Caumont and relieved by the 326th Division, which took over a 10 mi (16 km) front from the east of Villers-Bocage, next to the 276th Infantry Division, westwards to the Drôme river, the boundary between the LXXIV Korps in Panzergruppe West and the 7th Army. The 326th Division, south and east of Caumont, was up to strength and took over a large number of field defences and camouflaged firing positions behind extensive minefields in the ideal defensive terrain of the Suisse Normande bocage.

=== Plan ===
XXX Corps was to lead the attack with the 43rd (Wessex) Infantry Division advancing to the top of Bois du Homme (Point 361). The left flank was to be protected by the 50th (Northumbrian) Infantry Division with the 7th Armoured Division in reserve. On the right, western flank, XXX Corps was to be protected by the VIII Corps, with the 15th (Scottish) Infantry Division attacking south from Caumont and the 11th Armoured Division attacking cross-country further west, ready to exploit a German collapse by advancing towards Petit Aunay, 3.7 mi (6.0 km) west of Saint-Martin-des-Besaces. A raid by over 1,000 bombers rather than an artillery bombardment was to prepare the way for the attack.

Due to the rush to prepare Bluecoat, the usual scale of artillery and aircraft support was not possible. Preparatory barrages and counter-battery fire were not to be used, artillery concentrations would be fired on the German forward positions instead. RAF Bomber Command was to use its heavy bombers on four areas about 5,000 yd (4,600 m) in front of XXX Corps with medium bombers of the US Ninth Air Force attacking three areas in front of VIII Corps. Most of the bombing was scheduled for an hour after the start of the operation. Tactical air forces were held for support rather than for use before the attack.

== Battle ==
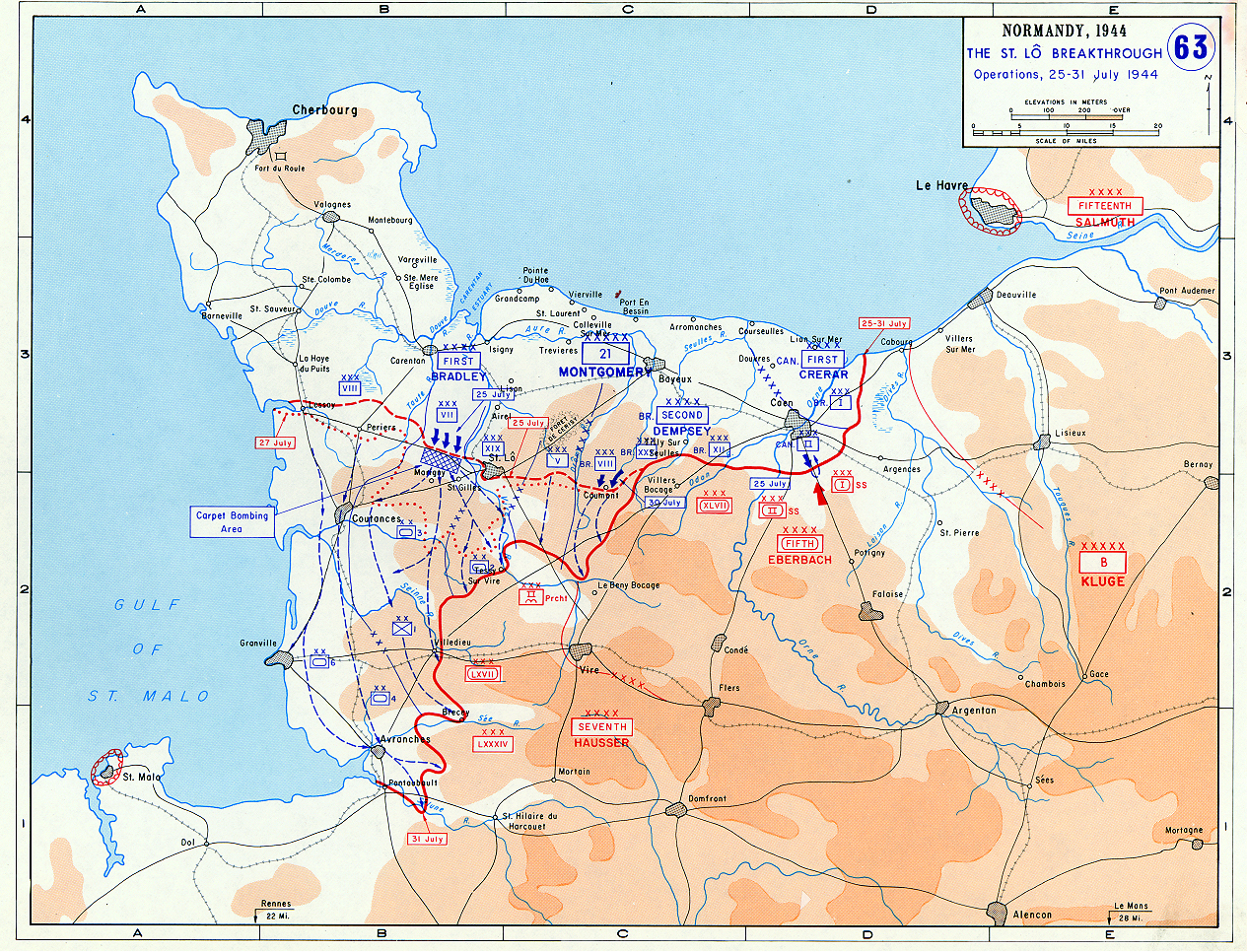
Operations Cobra and Bluecoat

Visibility was poor with low dense cloud that affected air support; as well as making bombing difficult it stopped fighter-bomber support until the afternoon. More than half of the 700 RAF bombers were recalled without dropping their bombs as they could not see their targets. The USAAF bombed through thick cloud but the bombers accurately placed 2,000 long tons (2,000 t) of bombs. The damage to German equipment was slight, partly because there was little of it in the target areas and because the 43rd and 50th divisions were held just beyond the start line, well north of the target areas in their sector. The advance of the left flank units of the 11th Armoured Division through "Area A" made rapid progress. Many British units were held up by minefields, sunken roads, thick hedges and steep gullies but in the centre the attackers gained 5 mi (8.0 km). On 31 July, the 11th Armoured Division of VIII Corps exploited a German inter–army boundary weakness and discovered an undefended bridge ("Dickie's Bridge") 5 mi (8.0 km) behind the German front, over the River Souleuvre. Reinforcing the opportunity quickly with Cromwell tanks followed by further support units, they defeated the first German armoured units sent to counter-attack. British forces advanced to about 5 mi (8.0 km) short of Vire by 2 August, which was on the American side of the army boundary. There was confusion as to who had the rights to use certain roads and the British attack was restricted and diverted south-east.

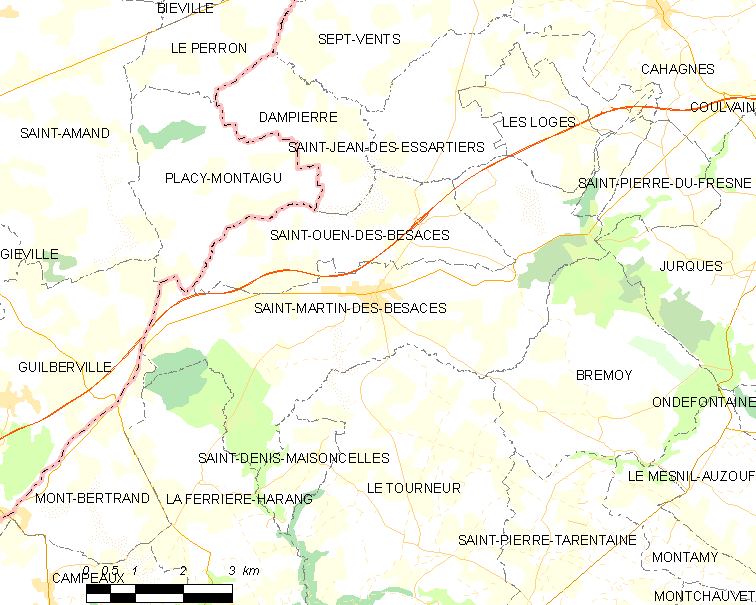
St-Martin-des-Besaces (Map commune FR insee code 14629)

The 7th Army was able to reinforce the town with troops from the 3rd Fallschirmjager Division, which was being forced south by the V US Corps and to move elements of the 9th SS Panzer Division south-west to close the gap between the 7th Army and Panzergruppe West and the British advance was held up by the German reinforcements. VIII Corps also had to protect its eastern flank, because XXX Corps had not kept up the same rate of advance. The commander of XXX Corps, Lieutenant-General Gerard Bucknall, was dismissed on 2 August and the commander of the 7th Armoured Division, Major-General George Erskine, was sacked the next day. Lieutenant-General Brian Horrocks, a veteran of the North African campaign replaced Bucknall on 4 August. The Second Army advance was brought to a temporary halt on 4 August. Vire fell to an American night attack by the 116th Infantry Regiment (US 29th Division) against the German 363rd Division on 6 August. On the same day, the 43rd (Wessex) Division and tanks of the 13th/18th Royal Hussars captured Mont Pinçon.

== Aftermath ==
=== Analysis ===
Operation Bluecoat kept German armoured units fixed on the British eastern flank and continued the wearing down of the German armoured formations in the area. The breakthrough in the centre of the Allied front surprised the Germans, when they were distracted by the Allied attacks at both ends of the Normandy bridgehead. By the time of the American break-out at Avranches, there was little to no reserve strength left for Operation Luttich, the German counter-offensive, which was defeated by 12 August. The 7th Army had no choice but to retire rapidly east of the Orne river, covered by a rearguard of all the remaining armoured and motorised units, to allow time for the surviving infantry to reach the Seine. After the first stage of the withdrawal beyond the Orne, the manoeuvre collapsed for a lack of fuel, Allied air attacks and the constant pressure of the Allied armies, culminating in the encirclement of many German forces in the Falaise pocket.

=== Casualties ===
During Bluecoat and later operations in Normandy, VIII Corps suffered 5,114 casualties.

=== Subsequent operations ===
==== Operation Grouse ====
With news from the American sector by 9 August that Unternehmen Lüttich (Operation Liège), the German counter-offensive from Mortain, had been defeated, O'Connor planned a new attack, either to pin down the German defenders opposite VIII Corps or to precipitate a collapse. The 3rd Division would advance around Vire and the Guards Armoured Division was to advance down Perrier Ridge, VIII Corps establishing itself on high ground between Tinchebray and Condé-sur-Noireau around Mont de Cerisi, about 12 mi (20 km) south-east of Vire. A three-phase attack was planned by the Guards Armoured Division and the attached 6th Guards Tank Brigade, to begin on 11 August but the day dawned with a dense mist, which prevented the preliminary bombing and disorganised the tank–infantry attack. German defensive fire restricted the advance on the eastern flank to 400 yd (370 m). In the centre, three Panther tanks were spotted in a farmyard at Le Haut Perrier and ambushed, two being knocked out and the survivor being set on fire on the southern outskirts of the village by a PIAT gunner. The British advance continued towards Point 242 north of Chênedollé, where a German counter-attack knocked out six Sherman tanks for a loss of two Panthers and a Sturmgeschütz III assault gun. To the west, the 2nd Irish Guards–5th Coldstream tank–infantry group made faster progress and reached the west side of Chênedollé. When the village was attacked it was found that the garrison had withdrawn and as the bombers had failed to arrive, the village was consolidated and further attacks were postponed and then cancelled.

On the right of the Guards Armoured Division, the attack began at 9:00 a.m. along a road running south through Viessoix and le Broulay, 1.9 mi (3 km) further on, thence to Moncy, 5.0 mi (8 km) to the east, protected on the right by the advance of the 3rd Division. From Moncy, the attack was to be continued to Point 260 on Mont de Cerisi 3.1 mi (5 km) further on. German resistance was as determined as that in the east. To the north of La Personnerie, minefields covered by fire from the 3rd Fallschirmjäger Division, held up the advance. In the afternoon an attempt to detour to the east through Le Val was also blocked, the advance having covered only 2,600 ft (800 m) in five hours. With the attack bogged down at Le Val and Viessoix the troops at Le Val were withdrawn during the evening and new orders were received to hold the Vire–Vassy road.

== Order of battle ==
=== British ===
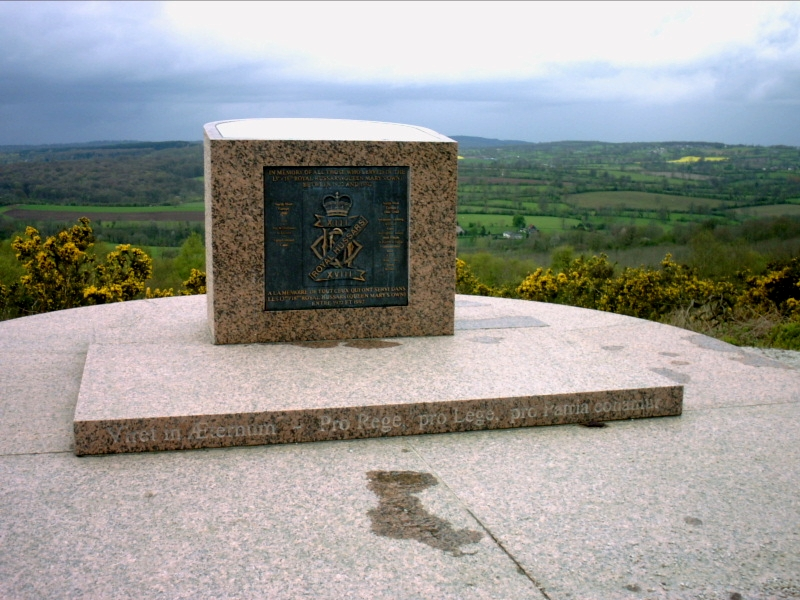
Royal Hussars Monument

Second Army (Miles Dempsey) (Note: Data for the orders of battle of the British and German forces are taken from the British Official History, Ellis, L. F. The Battle of Normandy (1962) unless indicated.)

- VIII Corps (Richard O'Connor)
  - 15th (Scottish) Infantry Division (Gordon MacMillan)
  - Guards Armoured Division (Allan Adair)
  - 11th Armoured Division ("Pip" Roberts)
  - 3rd Infantry Division (temporarily attached) (Lashmer Whistler)
  - 6th Guards Tank Brigade (Gerald Verney to 3 August then Sir Walter Bartellot)
  - 8th Army Group Royal Artillery (Archibald Campbell of Achalader)
- XXX Corps (Gerard Bucknall to 2 August then Brian Horrocks)
  - 43rd (Wessex) Infantry Division (Ivor Thomas)
  - 50th (Northumbrian) Infantry Division (Douglas Alexander Graham)
  - 7th Armoured Division (George Erskine to 4 August then Gerald Verney)
  - 8th Armoured Brigade (George Prior-Palmer)

=== German ===
Panzergruppe West (renamed 5th Panzer Army, August 1944) (Heinrich Eberbach)
initially present:

- XLVII Panzer Corps (part) (Hans Freiherr von Funck)
  - 276th Infantry Division (Curt Badinski)
  - 326th Infantry Division (Viktor von Drabich-Wächter)

reinforcements

- II SS Panzer Corps (Wilhelm Bittrich)
  - 9th SS Panzer Division Hohenstaufen (Friedrich-Wilhelm Bock)
  - 10th SS Panzer Division Frundsberg (Heinz Harmel)
  - 21st Panzer Division (Edgar Feuchtinger)
  - 1st SS Panzer Division Leibstandarte SS Adolf Hitler (part) (Theodor Wisch)

== Notable actions ==
- Night attack by 5th DCLI on Les Plessis Grimoult, south of Mont Pinçon.
- Destruction of most of a Squadron from 6th Guards Tank Brigade by Jagdpanther tank destroyers of 654 Schwere Panzerjägerabteilung.

== Legacy ==
Musée de la Percée du Bocage - Also known as the Bocage Breakthrough Museum is a museum dedicated to Operation Bluecoat located in Souleuvre en Bocage. It first opened in 1983 and moved to its current location in 1994 as part of the 50th Anniversary celebrations of the area being liberated.

Saint-Charles-de-Percy War Cemetery located in Valdallière is a cemetery of Commonwealth soldiers who mostly died during operation Bluecoat.

== See also ==
- Rhino tank
