= Valdallière =

- Commune
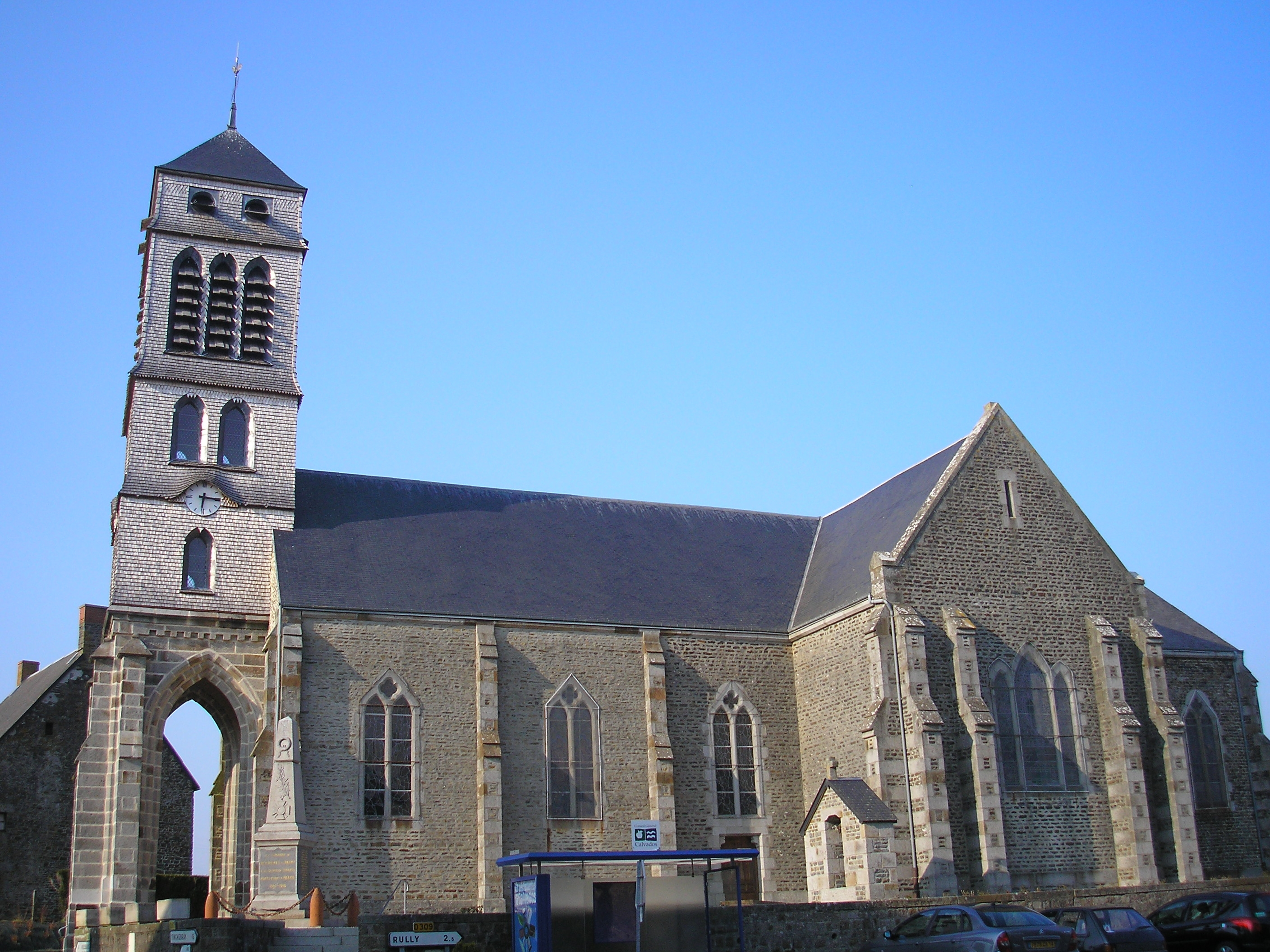
- The church in Bernières-le-Patry
- Location of Valdallière
- Location within France Location within Normandy
- Coordinates: 48°51′11″N 0°40′30″W
- Country: France
- Region: Normandy
- Department: Calvados
- Arrondissement: Vire
- Canton: Condé-en-Normandie
- Intercommunality: Intercom de la Vire au Noireau

Government
  - Mayor (2020–2026): Frédéric Brogniart
- Area^{1}: 157.94 km^{2} (60.98 sq mi)
- Population (2023): 5,696
  - Density: 36.06/km^{2} (93.41/sq mi)
- Time zone: UTC+01:00 (CET)
  - Summer (DST): UTC+02:00 (CEST)
- INSEE/Postal code: 14726 /14410, 14350
- ^{1} French Land Register data, which excludes lakes, ponds, glaciers > 1 km^{2} (0.386 sq mi or 247 acres) and river estuaries.

Valdallière (French pronunciation: [valdaljɛʁ]) is a commune in the department of Calvados, northwestern France. The municipality was established on 1 January 2016 by merger of the 14 former communes of Vassy (the seat), Bernières-le-Patry, Burcy, Chênedollé, Le Désert, Estry, Montchamp, Pierres, Presles, La Rocque, Rully, Saint-Charles-de-Percy, Le Theil-Bocage and Viessoix.

== Geography ==
The commune is made up of the following collection of villages and hamlets, La Beaumontière, Les Écoublets, Le Désert, Estry, Le Theil-Bocage, Presles, Burcy, Chênedollé, Vassy, La Parenterie, Viessoix, Montfroux, La Boëlle, Rully and Creuley.

The Commune along with another nine communes shares part of a 5,729 hectare, Natura 2000 conservation area, called the Bassin de la Druance. The commune also has another Natura 2000 conservation area, Bassin de la Souleuvre, a 2,232 hectare area which is shared with three other communes, Souleuvre en Bocage, Dialan sur Chaîne and Brémoy.

The commune is on the border of the area known as Suisse Normande.

== Points of Interest ==
- Saint-Charles-de-Percy War Cemetery is a British Second World War cemetery of Commonwealth soldiers located the village of Saint-Charles-de-Percy. The majority of the soldiers interred in the cemetery were killed in late July and early August 1944, as part of Operation Bluecoat.

=== National heritage sites ===
The Commune has four buildings and areas listed as a Monument historique.

- Église Notre-Dame de Burcy a fourteenth century church listed as a monument in 1921.
- Église Saint-Charles de Saint-Charles-de-Percy built in 1778 the church was listed as a monument in 1958.
- Commanderie de templiers de Courval Templar commandery of Courval was founded around 1150 by the Vassy family it was listed as a monument in 1950.
- Château de la Rochelle is nineteenth century château built for Louis-Philippe Dumont de la Rochelle, it was listed as a monument in 2005.

== Population ==
Population data refer to the commune in its geography as of January 2025.

Historical population
Year	Pop.	±% p.a.
1968	5,769	—
1975	5,271	−1.28%
1982	5,398	+0.34%
1990	5,363	−0.08%
1999	5,420	+0.12%
2007	5,797	+0.84%
2012	6,060	+0.89%
2017	5,951	−0.36%
2023	5,696	−0.73%
Source: INSEE

== Sport ==
Valdallière has a swimming pool the Piscine de Valdallière, which has been open since 1997.

== Notable people ==
- Marguerin de la Bigne (1546 - 1595 or 1597) - theologian and patrologist and first publisher of the complete works of Isidore of Seville was born here.
- Antoine Rodolphe Chevallier (1523–1572) was a Protestant Hebraist and a holder of teaching positions in England, who was born here.
- Charles-Julien Lioult de Chênedollé (1769 – 1833) was a French poet who died here.
- Raymond Lebreton - (1941 – 2022) a racing cyclist who raced in the Tour de France was born here.

== See also ==
- Communes of the Calvados department
