= Chênedollé =

Chênedollé may refer to:

- Charles-Julien Lioult de Chênedollé (1769–1833), French poet
- Chênedollé (former commune), now Valdallière, Normandy, France
