= Binius =

Binius may refer to:

- Severin Binius (1573–1641), German Roman Catholic priest, historian and critic
- Marguerin de la Bigne (1546–1595), French theologian and patrologist
