= Saint-Charles-de-Percy War Cemetery =

WWII CWGC cemetery in France

- Commonwealth War Graves Commission
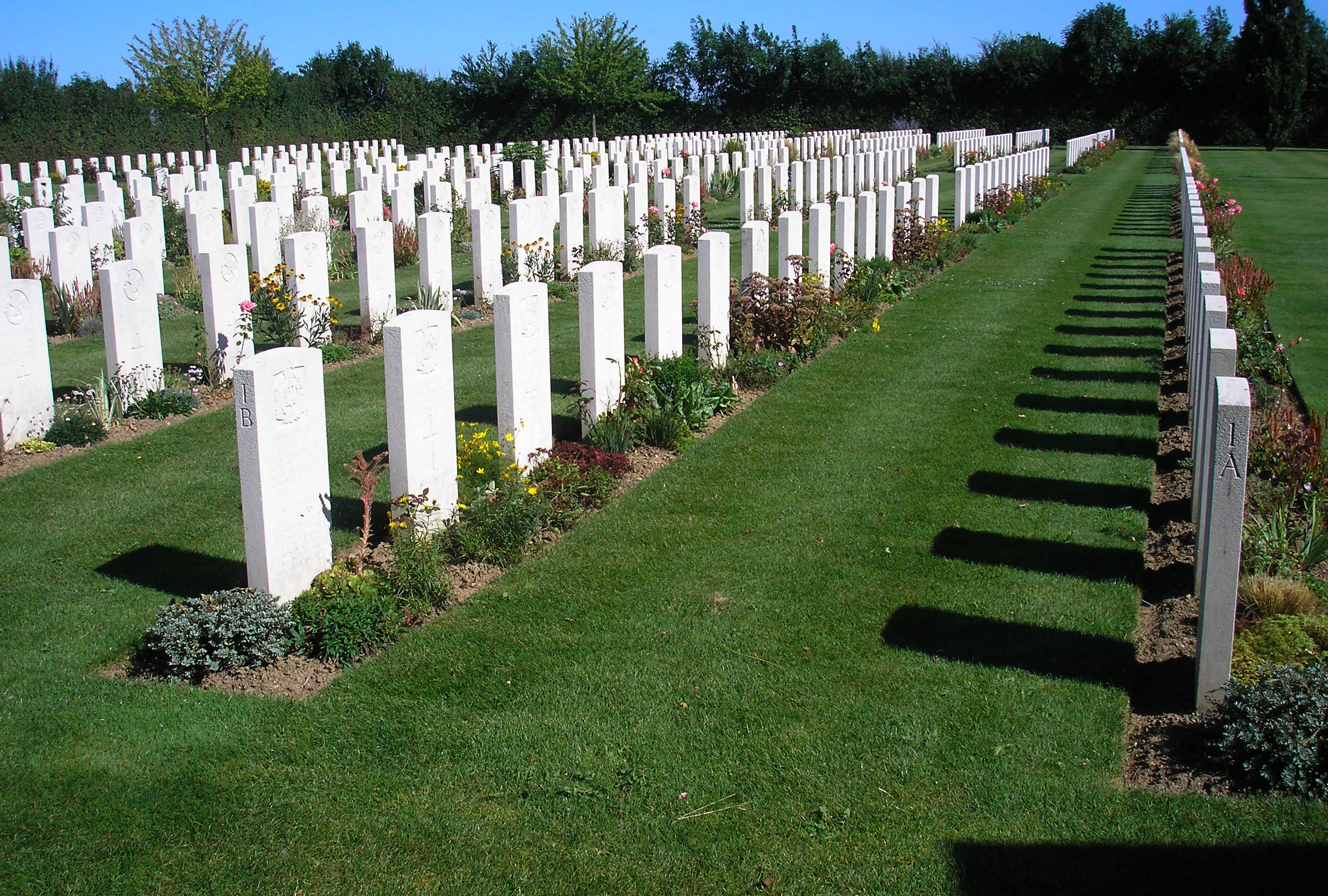
- Graves in the cemetery
- Used for those deceased 1944
- Established: 1944
- Location: 49.9250°N 0.7878°W near Saint-Charles-de-Percy War Cemetery, Normandy, France
- Designed by: Philip D. Hepworth
- Total burials: 809
- Unknowns: 106

Burials by war
- World War II

Saint-Charles-de-Percy War Cemetery is a British Second World War cemetery of Commonwealth soldiers located 1 km (0.62 mi) west of the village of Saint-Charles-de-Percy, some 44 km (27 mi) south-west of Caen in Normandy. The cemetery contains 703 identified Commonwealth war graves and is the southernmost British cemetery in Normandy.

== History ==
The majority of the soldiers interred in the cemetery were killed in late July and early August 1944, as part of Operation Bluecoat. British forces pushed south from Caumont-l'Éventé towards Vire to split the German 7th Army and 5th Panzer Army.

== Notable burials ==
- Brigadier Sir Walter Balfour Barttelot, 6th Guards Tank Brigade commander, killed in action on 16 August 1944 at Caumont-l'Éventé.

== Location ==
The cemetery is 15 km (9.3 mi) north-east of Vire, between Montchamp and La Ferronnière on the D.290A just off the D.56.

== See also ==
- List of military cemeteries in Normandy
