= Désert =

Désert may refer to:

- "Désert" (Émilie Simon song), 2002
- Desert (novel) (French: Désert), a 1980 novel by J. M. G. Le Clézio
- Le désert, an 1844 "ode-symphonie" by Félicien David with words by Auguste Colin
- Le Désert, a former commune in Calvados, France

== People ==
- Alex Désert (born 1968), American actor and musician
- Claire Désert (born 1967), French classical pianist
- Solen Désert-Mariller (born 1982), French Olympic sprinter

== See also ==
- Déserts, a 1954 composition by Edgard Varèse
- Desert (disambiguation)
