= Desert Star =

Desert Star may refer to:

- Monoptilon, the desertstar flower
- Desert Star Theater, a dinner theatre in Murray, Utah, USA

== See also ==
- Hi-Desert Star, newspaper from San Bernardino County, California, USA
- Star of the Desert Arena, indoor arena in Primm, Nevada, USA
- Desert Sun (disambiguation)
- Desert (disambiguation)
- Star (disambiguation)
