= Desert Sun =

Desert sun refers to the harsh solar radiation encountered in a desert environment.

Desert Sun may also refer to:

- The Desert Sun, a newspaper from Palm Springs, California, U.S.
- Desert Sun Airlines (1995–1996) a defunct airline subsidiary operated by Mesa Airlines
- Desert Sun Stadium, a soccer stadium located in Yuma, Arizona, U.S.

== See also ==
- Sundesert Nuclear Power Plant, a canceled power station in California, USA
- Sons of the Desert (disambiguation)
- Desert Star (disambiguation)
- Desert (disambiguation)
- Sun (disambiguation)
