= Burcy =

Burcy may refer to the following places in France:

- Burcy, Calvados, in the Calvados département
- Burcy, Seine-et-Marne, in the Seine-et-Marne département
