= Presles =

Presles is the name or part of the name of several places:

== In France ==
- Presles, Calvados, in the Calvados département
- Presles, Isère, in the Isère département
- Presles, Val-d'Oise, in the Val-d'Oise département
- Presles-en-Brie, in the Seine-et-Marne département
- Presles-et-Boves, in the Aisne département
- Presles-et-Thierny, in the Aisne département

== In Belgium ==
- Presles, Belgium, a village in the municipality of Aiseau-Presles, Hainaut
