= La Rocque =

- Part of Valdallière
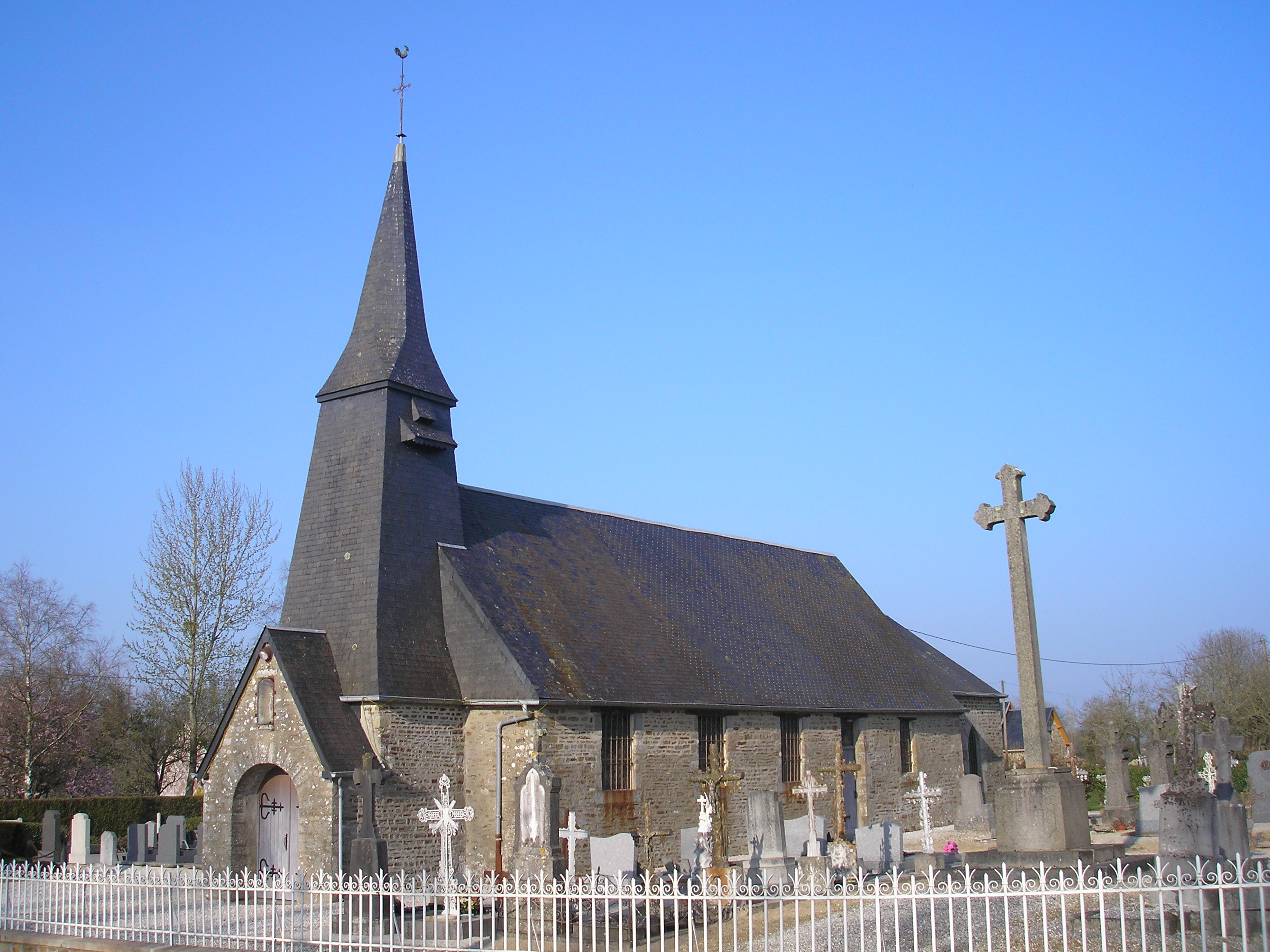
- Location of La Rocque
- Location within France Location within Normandy
- Coordinates: 48°53′24″N 0°40′27″W
- Country: France
- Region: Normandy
- Department: Calvados
- Arrondissement: Vire
- Canton: Condé-en-Normandie
- Commune: Valdallière
- Area^{1}: 4.93 km^{2} (1.90 sq mi)
- Highest elevation: 226 m (741 ft)
- Lowest elevation: 169 m (554 ft)
- Population (2023): 84
  - Density: 17/km^{2} (44/sq mi)
- Time zone: UTC+01:00 (CET)
  - Summer (DST): UTC+02:00 (CEST)
- Postal code: 14410
- ^{1} French Land Register data, which excludes lakes, ponds, glaciers > 1 km^{2} (0.386 sq mi or 247 acres) and river estuaries.

La Rocque (French pronunciation: [la ʁɔk]) is a former commune in the Calvados department in the Normandy region in northwestern France. On 1 January 2016, it was merged into the new commune of Valdallière.

== Personalities ==
- Colonel François de La Rocque (1885–1946), French leader of Croix-de-feu

== See also ==
- Communes of the Calvados department
