= Rully, Calvados =

Rully
- Part of Valdallière
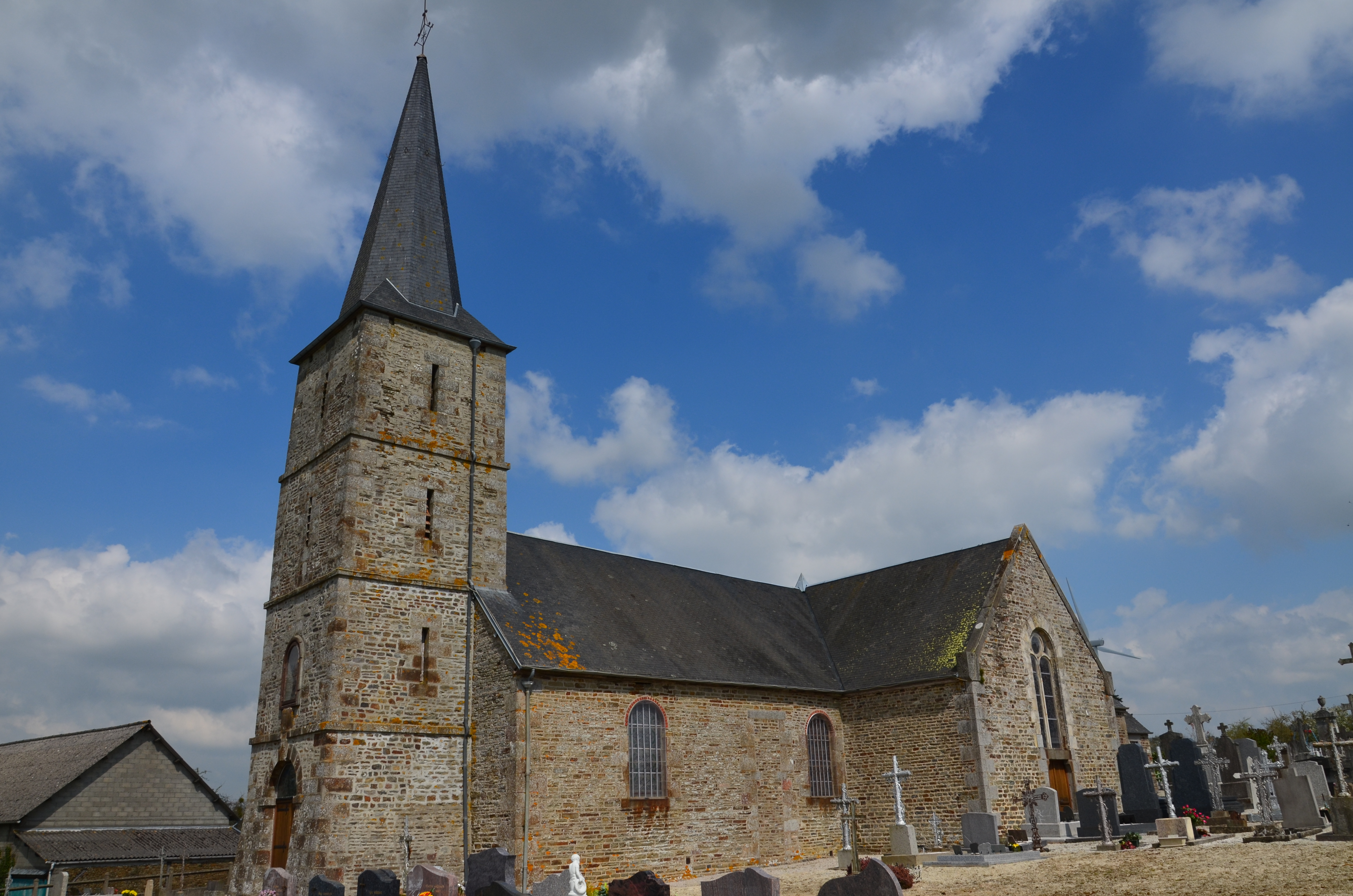
- Location of Rully
- Location within France Location within Normandy
- Coordinates: 48°49′32″N 0°42′47″W
- Country: France
- Region: Normandy
- Department: Calvados
- Arrondissement: Vire
- Canton: Condé-en-Normandie
- Commune: Valdallière
- Area^{1}: 9.97 km^{2} (3.85 sq mi)
- Elevation: 203 m (666 ft)
- Highest elevation: 242 m (794 ft)
- Lowest elevation: 152 m (499 ft)
- Population (2023): 201
  - Density: 20.2/km^{2} (52.2/sq mi)
- Time zone: UTC+01:00 (CET)
  - Summer (DST): UTC+02:00 (CEST)
- Postal code: 14410
- ^{1} French Land Register data, which excludes lakes, ponds, glaciers > 1 km^{2} (0.386 sq mi or 247 acres) and river estuaries.

Rully (French pronunciation: [ʁyli]) is a former commune in the Calvados department in the Normandy region in northwestern France. On 1 January 2016, it was merged into the new commune of Valdallière.

== See also ==
- Communes of the Calvados department
