= Estry =

- Part of Valdallière
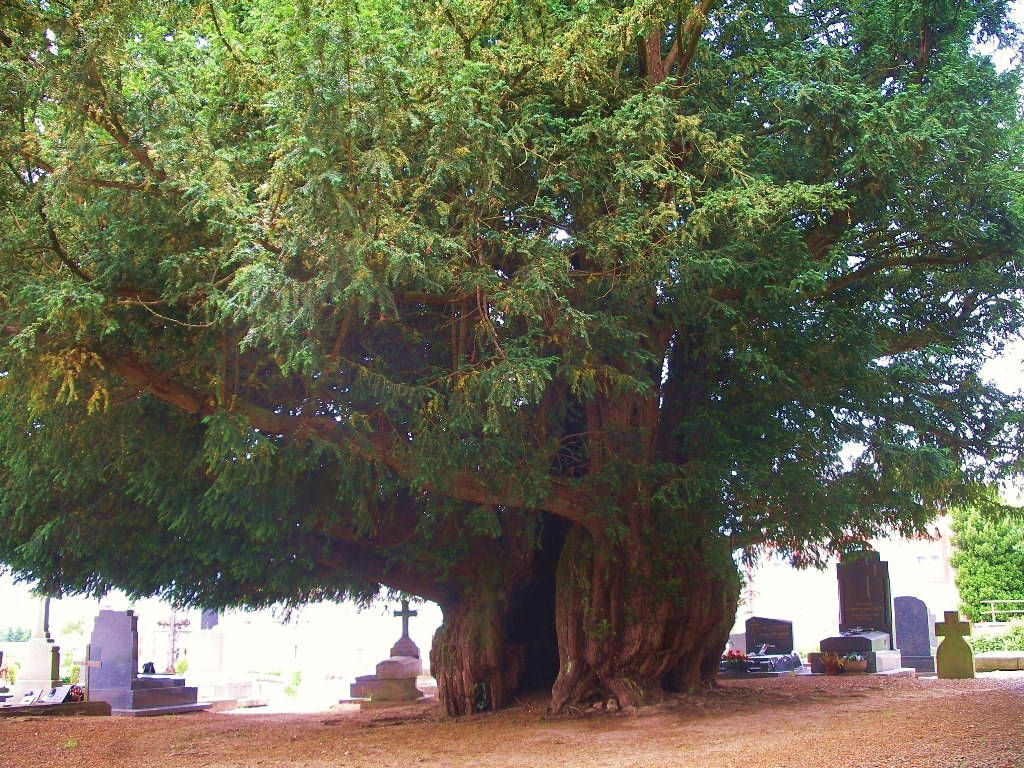
- Yew tree in Estry, approx 1600 years old
- Location of Estry
- Location within France Location within Normandy
- Coordinates: 48°53′53″N 0°44′02″W
- Country: France
- Region: Normandy
- Department: Calvados
- Arrondissement: Vire
- Canton: Condé-en-Normandie
- Commune: Valdallière
- Area^{1}: 10.75 km^{2} (4.15 sq mi)
- Elevation: 240 m (790 ft)
- Highest elevation: 245 m (804 ft)
- Lowest elevation: 143 m (469 ft)
- Population (2023): 357
  - Density: 33.2/km^{2} (86.0/sq mi)
- Time zone: UTC+01:00 (CET)
  - Summer (DST): UTC+02:00 (CEST)
- Postal code: 14410
- ^{1} French Land Register data, which excludes lakes, ponds, glaciers > 1 km^{2} (0.386 sq mi or 247 acres) and river estuaries.

Estry (French pronunciation: [ɛtʁi]) is a former commune in the Calvados department in the Normandy region in northwestern France. On 1 January 2016, it was merged into the new commune of Valdallière.

== See also ==
- Communes of the Calvados department
