= Severin Binius =

German Roman Catholic priest, historian and critic

Severin Binius (1573, in Randerath, present-day Germany – 14 February 1641) was a German Roman Catholic priest, historian and critic.

== Life ==
He studied at the gymnasium of St. Lawrence, in Cologne, and later taught in the same school for several years. After his ordination to the priesthood he obtained the degree of doctor of divinity from the University of Cologne, where he taught general ecclesiastical history and ecclesiastical discipline, eventually becoming (1627–30) Rector Magnificus of the university. Binius was successively canon in two chapter-churches of Cologne and finally in the cathedral. In 1631 he was made counselor and vicar-general of the archdiocese, a promotion due to his learning and one which was justified by his ability in managing the affairs of the archdiocese. Besides his many ordinary occupations he was active in the ecclesiastical ministry and was known for his charity towards the poor, especially to needy students.

== Works ==
Binius is best known for his edition of the Councils of the Church. The previous collections by Jacques Merlin, Petrus Crabbe and Lorenzo Surius appeared incomplete to him, lacking as they did explanatory notes. With the help of other scholars he prepared a new edition of the councils in four folio volumes (Cologne, 1606) under the title Concilia generalia et provincialia. It gives only the Latin text, and contains the acts of the councils, the decretal letters, and the lives of the popes. Binius added copious explanatory notes drawn largely from the Ecclesiastical Annals of Caesar Baronius. A second edition, considerably enlarged and containing also the Greek text, appeared at Cologne in 1618. In 1639 a third edition in nine volumes appeared at Paris, in preparation for which extensive use was made of the collection of councils published at Rome from 1608 to 1612. Binius also prepared an edition of the ecclesiastical histories of Eusebius of Caesarea, Socrates of Constantinople, Theodoret, Sozomen and Evagrius Scholasticus.

== Bibliography ==
- Hurter, Hugo von, Nomenclator (Innsbruck, 1892), I
- Hefele, Karl Josef von, Conciliengesch (Freiburg, 1873), I
- Hermann Joseph Hartzheim, Bibliotheca Coloniensis (Freiburg, 1747), 295
