= Johannes van den Driesche =

Flemish Protestant divine, Orientalist, Christian Hebraist and exegete (1550–1616)

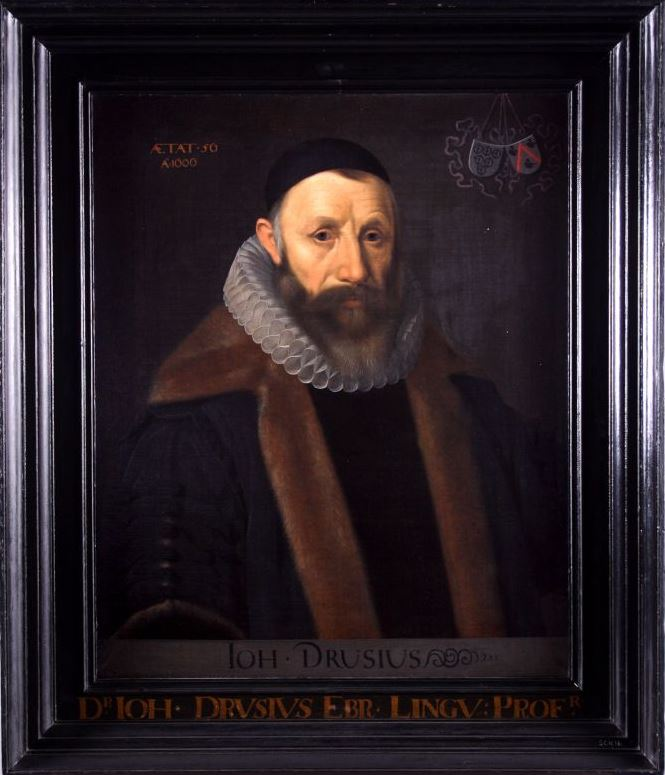
Johannes Drusius

Johannes van den Driesche [or Drusius] (28 June 1550 – February 1616) was a Flemish Protestant divine, distinguished specially as an Orientalist, Christian Hebraist and exegete.

== Life ==
He was born at Oudenarde, in Flanders. Intended for the church, he studied Greek and Latin at Ghent, and philosophy at Leuven; but his father having been outlawed for his religion, and deprived of his estate, retired to England, where the son followed him in 1567. He found a teacher of Hebrew in Antoine Rodolphe Chevallier, with whom he resided for some time at Cambridge. In 1572 he became professor of Oriental languages at Oxford.

Upon the pacification of Ghent (1576), he returned with his father to their own country, and was appointed professor of Oriental languages at the University of Leiden in the following year. In 1585, he removed to Friesland and was admitted as professor of Hebrew at the University of Franeker, an office which he discharged with great honour until his death. He acquired a reputation as a professor, and his class was frequented by students from all the Protestant countries in Europe.

== Works ==
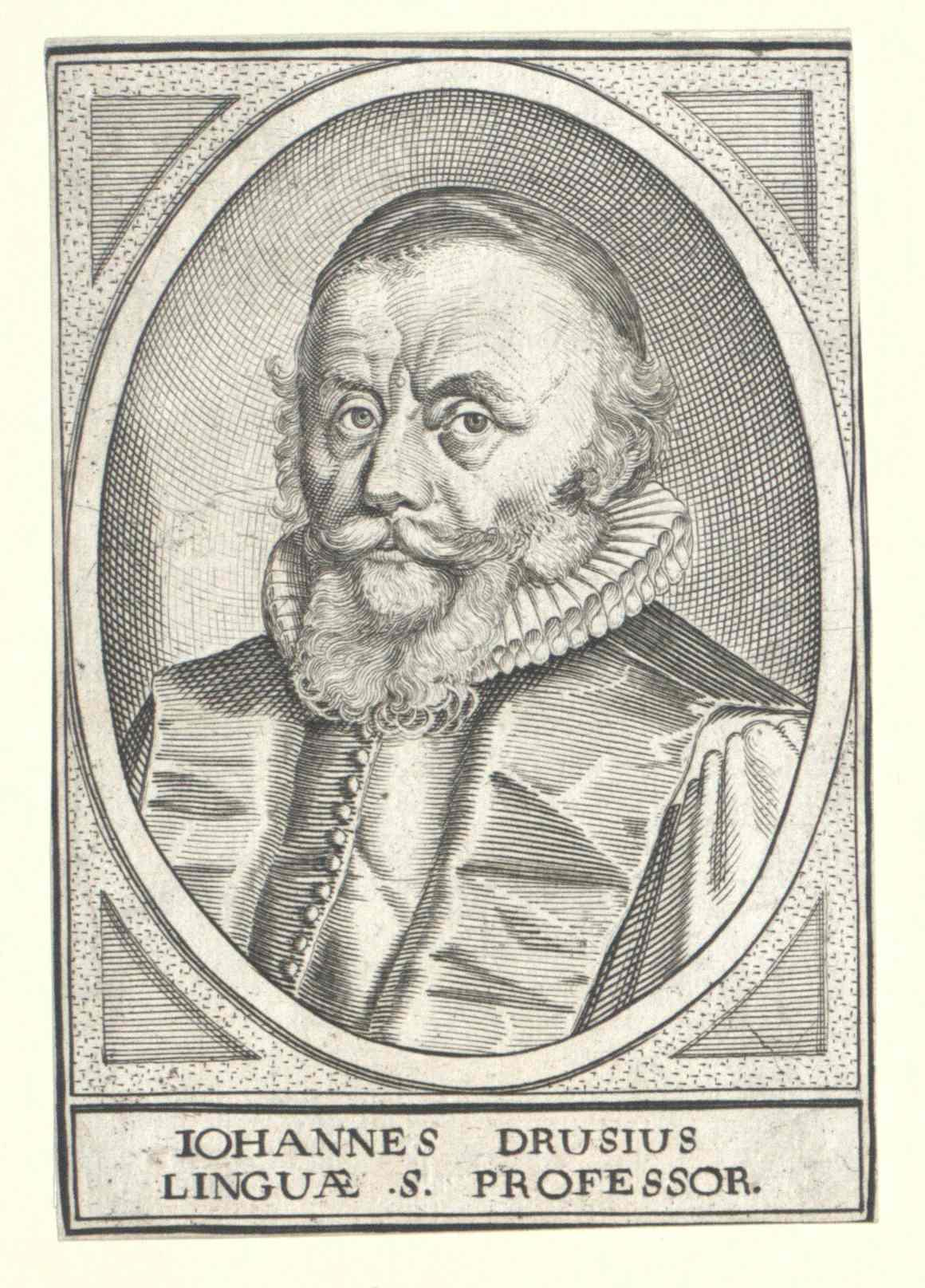
Johannes van den Driesche

He was learned in Hebrew and in Jewish antiquities; and in 1600 the states-general employed him, at a salary of 400 florins a year, to write notes on the difficult passages in the Old Testament; but, this work was not published until after his death. As the friend of Jacobus Arminius, he was charged by the Contra-Remonstrant party with unfairness in the execution of the task, and the last sixteen years of his life were therefore marred by controversy.

He carried on an extensive correspondence with the learned in different countries; for, besides letters in Hebrew, Greek and other languages, there were found amongst his papers upwards of 2000 written in Latin. He had a son, John, who died in England at the age of twenty-one, and was accounted a prodigy of learning. He had mastered Hebrew at the age of nine, and Scaliger said that he was a better Hebrew scholar than his father.

He wrote a large number of letters in Hebrew, besides notes on the Proverbs of Solomon and other works. Jean-Noël Paquot states the number of the printed works and treatises of the elder Drusius at forty-eight, and of the unprinted at upwards of twenty. Of the former more than two-thirds were inserted in the collection entitled Critici sacri, sive annotata doctissimorum virorum in Vetus et Novum Testamentum (Amsterdam, 1698, in 9 volumes folio, or London, 1660, in 10 volumes folio).

Amongst the works of Drusius not to be found in this collection may be mentioned:

1. Alphabetum Hebraicum vetus (1584, 4to)
2. Tabulae in grammaticam Chaldaicam ad usum juventutis (1602, 8vo)
3. An edition of Sulpicius Severus (Franker, 1807, 12mo)
4. Opuscula quae ad grammaticam spectant omnia (1609, 4to)
5. Lacrymae in obitum J. Scaligeri (1609, 4to)
6. Grammatica linguae sanctae nova (1612, 4to).

== Notable students ==
- Petrus Cunaeus
