= Le Theil-Bocage =

- Part of Valdallière
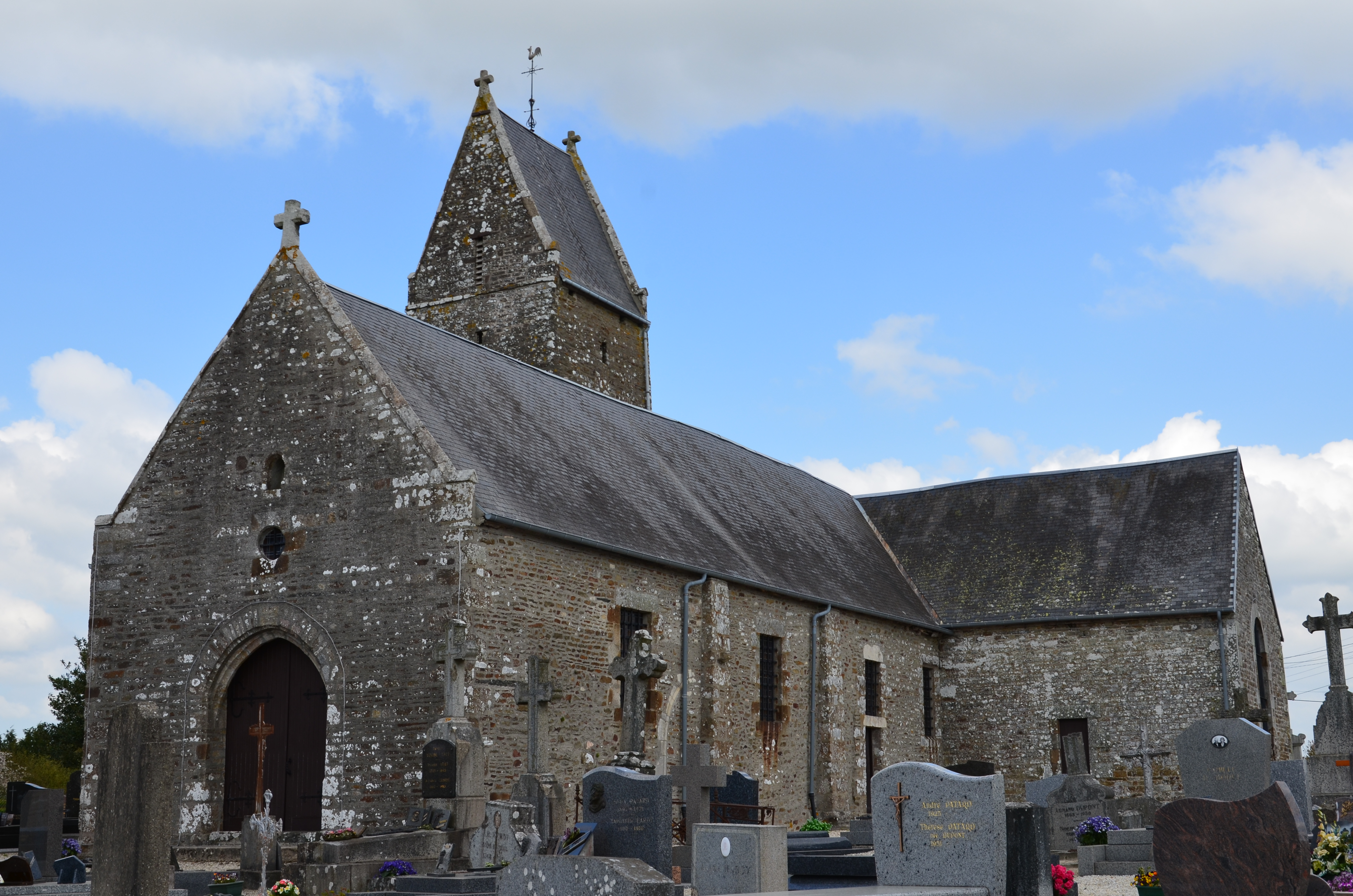
- Location of Le Theil-Bocage
- Location within France Location within Normandy
- Coordinates: 48°52′55″N 0°42′53″W
- Country: France
- Region: Normandy
- Department: Calvados
- Arrondissement: Vire
- Canton: Condé-en-Normandie
- Commune: Valdallière
- Area^{1}: 8.86 km^{2} (3.42 sq mi)
- Elevation: 218 m (715 ft)
- Highest elevation: 233 m (764 ft)
- Lowest elevation: 155 m (509 ft)
- Population (2023): 222
  - Density: 25.1/km^{2} (64.9/sq mi)
- Time zone: UTC+01:00 (CET)
  - Summer (DST): UTC+02:00 (CEST)
- Postal code: 14410
- ^{1} French Land Register data, which excludes lakes, ponds, glaciers > 1 km^{2} (0.386 sq mi or 247 acres) and river estuaries.

Le Theil-Bocage (French pronunciation: [lə tɛj bɔkaʒ]) is a former commune in the Calvados department in the Normandy region in northwestern France. On 1 January 2016, it was merged into the new commune of Valdallière.

== See also ==
- Communes of the Calvados department
