= Antoine Rodolphe Chevallier =

French Protestant Hebraist and tutor

- Born: 16 March 1523; Montchamps
- Died: 8 October 1572 (aged 49); Guernsey
- Employer(s): University of Cambridge, St Paul's Cathedral, University of Geneva, University of Strasbourg
- Known for: Teacher and lecturer of Hebrew
- Partner: Elizabeth de Grimecieux
- Children: Emanuel

Antoine Rodolphe Chevallier (16 March 1523–8 October 1572) was a French Protestant Hebraist and a holder of teaching positions in England. He acted as tutor in French and Hebrew to the future Elizabeth I of England.

== Life ==
He was born on 16 March 1523 at Montchamps, near Vire in Normandy. He studied Hebrew under Francis Vatablus at Paris, and became a Protestant. He came to England in Edward VI's reign, about 1548; and was entertained first by Paul Fagius and Martin Bucer and afterwards by Archbishop Thomas Cranmer, with whom he stayed for more than a year. Subsequently he settled at Cambridge, where he gave free lectures in Hebrew, and lodged with Emanuel Tremellius, the Hebrew professor. He was pensioned by Cranmer and Thomas Goodrich, bishop of Ely, and married Elizabeth de Grimecieux, Tremellius's stepdaughter, on 1 December 1550. His eldest child, Emanuel, was born at Cambridge on 8 September 1551.

Cranmer recommended Chevallier to the king's notice, and he was granted letters of denization and the reversion to the next vacant prebend at Canterbury. He was the "Mr. Anthony" who taught the Princess Elizabeth French. On Edward VI's death in 1553 Chevallier left for Strasbourg, where he was appointed Hebrew professor in 1559, but moved in the same year to Geneva and confirmed his intimacy with John Calvin, whose acquaintance he had made before 1554 Ultimately he settled at Caen, and in 1568 revisited England to solicit Queen Elizabeth's aid for the French Huguenots. He was in no hurry to return to Normandy, agreed to become Hebrew lecturer at St Paul's Cathedral, and in May 1569 received, at the suggestion of Matthew Parker and Edmund Grindal, the appointment of Regius Professor of Hebrew in the University of Cambridge. He matriculated on 3 August 1569, and on 5 September complained to Parker that his stipend as professor had been reduced. John Drusius and Hugh Broughton were his pupils.

Chevallier became a prebendary of Canterbury in 1570, and on 24 March 1572 received leave of absence from Canterbury for two years without prejudice to his emoluments. At the time of the St. Bartholomew's massacre in Paris he escaped to Guernsey, intending to return to England, but died there in October of the same year.

== Works ==
Chevalier's main writings were first published in Bryan Walton's Polyglot Bible of 1657. In that work appear Chevallier's translation from the Syriac into Latin of the Targum Hierosolmitanum, his Latin version of the Targum of Pseudo-Jonathan on the Pentateuch, and corrections of Jonathan's Targum on Joshua, Judges, Kings, Isaiah, Jeremiah, Ezekiel, and the twelve minor prophets. Chevallier's other works are:

- Rudimenta Hebraicae Linguae accurate methodo et brevitate conscripta, which includes a Hebrew letter by Tremellius commending the book, and a Syriac and Latin version by the author of St. Paul's Epistle to the Galatians, Geneva, 1560, 1567, 1591, and 1592, Wittenberg, 1574, Leyden, 1575; "cum notis P[etri] Cavallerii", Geneva, 1590
- Emendations on Pagninus's Thesaurus Linguae Sanctae, Leyden, 1576, and Geneva, 1614
- Alphabetum Hebraicum ex A. C. ... recognitione, 1566, 1600
- Hebrew verses on Calvin's death, printed in Theodore Beza's poems

Chevallier intended to publish an edition of the Bible in four languages, but did not finish it, and nothing is now known of it.
