= Sons of the Desert (disambiguation) =

Sons of the Desert is a 1933 comedy film starring Laurel and Hardy.

Sons of the Desert may also refer to:

- The Sons of the Desert, the official Laurel and Hardy appreciation society named after the 1933 film
- Sons of the Desert (band), a band named for the film
- Sons of the Desert (Danish group), a Danish musical/comedy group

== See also ==
- Realm of the Desert Sons, a boardgame
- Desert Sun (disambiguation)
