= Bernières-le-Patry =

- Part of Valdallière
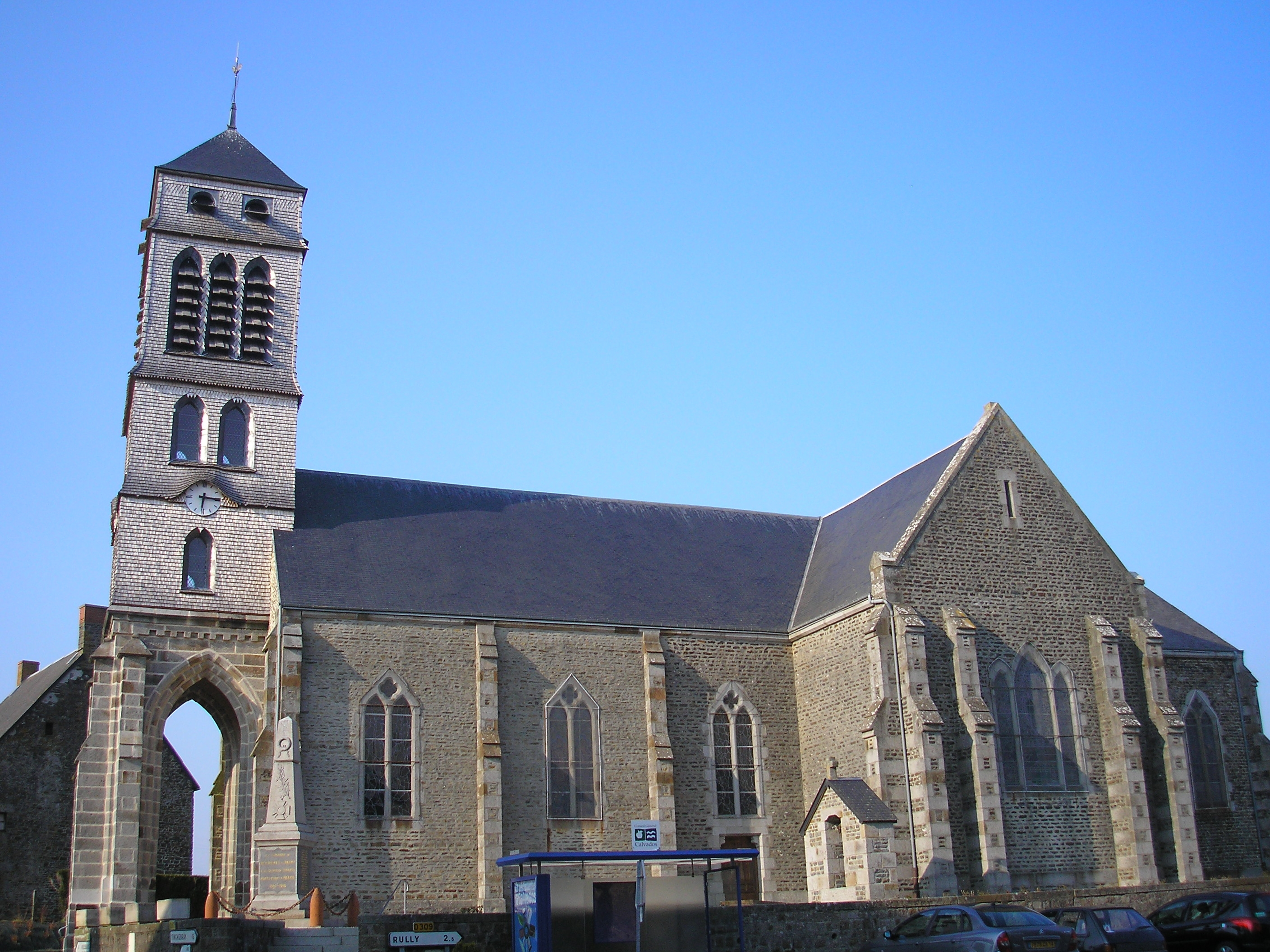
- St. Gerbold
- Location of Bernières-le-Patry
- Location within France Location within Normandy
- Coordinates: 48°48′54″N 0°44′07″W
- Country: France
- Region: Normandy
- Department: Calvados
- Arrondissement: Vire
- Canton: Condé-en-Normandie
- Commune: Valdallière
- Area^{1}: 15.67 km^{2} (6.05 sq mi)
- Elevation: 182 m (597 ft)
- Highest elevation: 270 m (890 ft)
- Lowest elevation: 152 m (499 ft)
- Population (2022): 523
  - Density: 33.4/km^{2} (86.4/sq mi)
- Time zone: UTC+01:00 (CET)
  - Summer (DST): UTC+02:00 (CEST)
- Postal code: 14410
- ^{1} French Land Register data, which excludes lakes, ponds, glaciers > 1 km^{2} (0.386 sq mi or 247 acres) and river estuaries.

Bernières-le-Patry (French pronunciation: [bɛʁnjɛʁ lə patʁi]) is a former commune in the Calvados department in the Normandy region in northwestern France. On 1 January 2016, it was merged into the new commune of Valdallière.

== Population ==
Historical population

Year	Pop.	±% p.a.
1793	1,464	—
1800	1,132	−3.61%
1806	1,461	+4.34%
1821	1,419	−0.19%
1831	1,423	+0.03%
1836	1,510	+1.19%
1841	1,547	+0.49%
1846	1,563	+0.21%
1851	1,568	+0.06%
1856	1,500	−0.88%
1861	1,502	+0.03%
1866	1,504	+0.03%
1872	1,344	−1.86%
1876	1,268	−1.44%
1881	1,122	−2.42%
1886	1,136	+0.25%
1891	1,075	−1.10%

Year	Pop.	±% p.a.
1896	973	−1.97%
1901	952	−0.44%
1906	907	−0.96%
1911	870	−0.83%
1921	757	−1.38%
1926	761	+0.11%
1931	784	+0.60%
1936	737	−1.23%
1946	712	−0.34%
1954	684	−0.50%
1962	691	+0.13%
1968	658	−0.81%
1975	532	−2.99%
1982	512	−0.55%
1990	485	−0.67%
1999	502	+0.38%
2022	523	+0.18%

Source: EHESS and INSEE

== See also ==
- Communes of the Calvados department
