= Montchamp, Calvados =

Montchamp
- Part of Valdallière
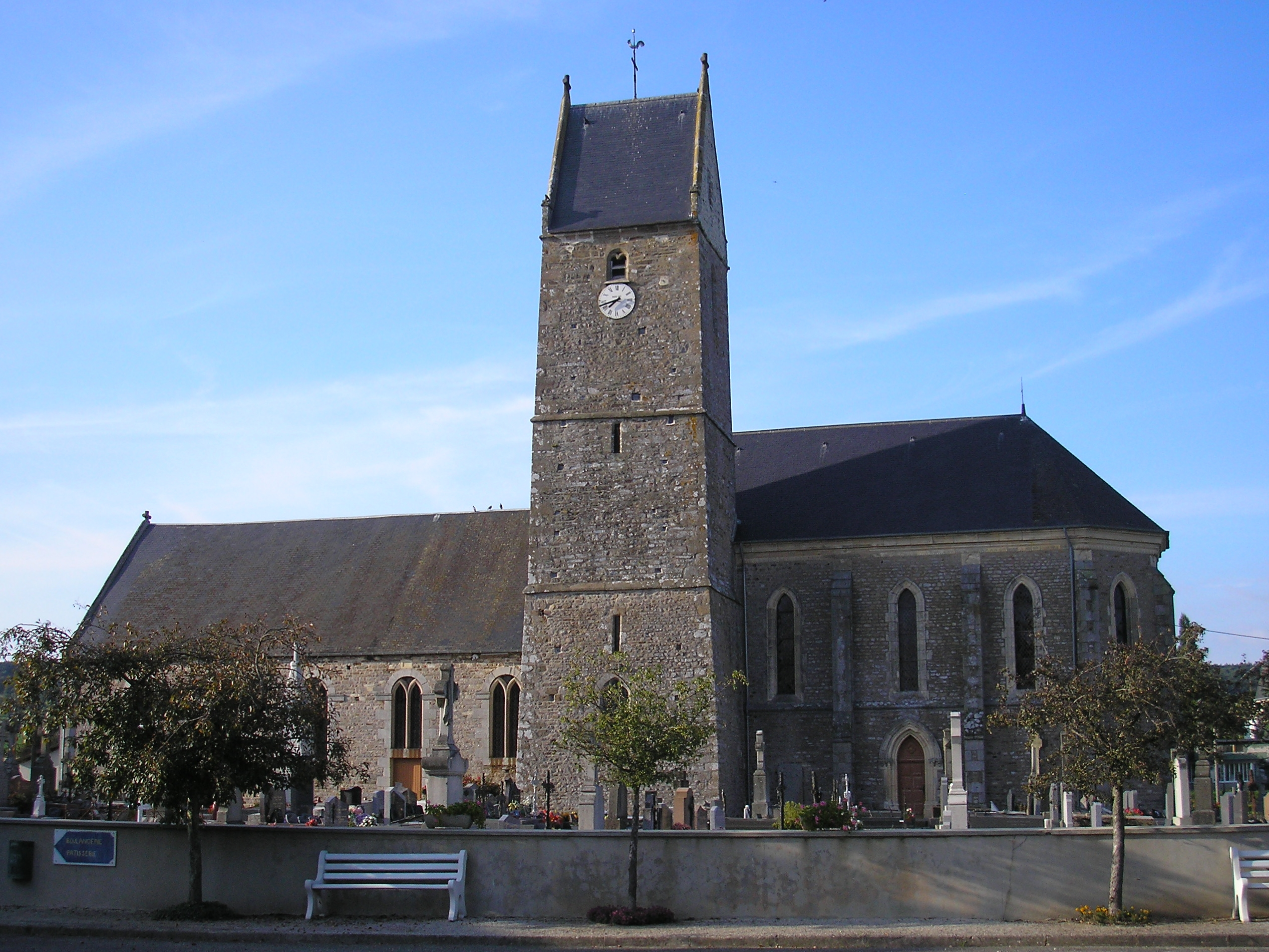
- Saint Martin

- Coat of arms
- Location of Montchamp
- Location within France Location within Normandy
- Coordinates: 48°55′19″N 0°45′54″W
- Country: France
- Region: Normandy
- Department: Calvados
- Arrondissement: Vire
- Canton: Condé-en-Normandie
- Commune: Valdallière
- Area^{1}: 16.20 km^{2} (6.25 sq mi)
- Elevation: 190 m (620 ft)
- Highest elevation: 260 m (850 ft)
- Lowest elevation: 154 m (505 ft)
- Population (2023): 542
  - Density: 33.5/km^{2} (86.7/sq mi)
- Time zone: UTC+01:00 (CET)
  - Summer (DST): UTC+02:00 (CEST)
- Postal code: 14350
- ^{1} French Land Register data, which excludes lakes, ponds, glaciers > 1 km^{2} (0.386 sq mi or 247 acres) and river estuaries.

Montchamp (French pronunciation: [mɔ̃ʃɑ̃]) is a former commune in the Calvados department in the Normandy region in northwestern France. On 1 January 2016, it was merged into the new commune of Valdallière.

== See also ==
- Communes of the Calvados department
