= Vassy, Calvados =

Vassy
- Part of Valdallière
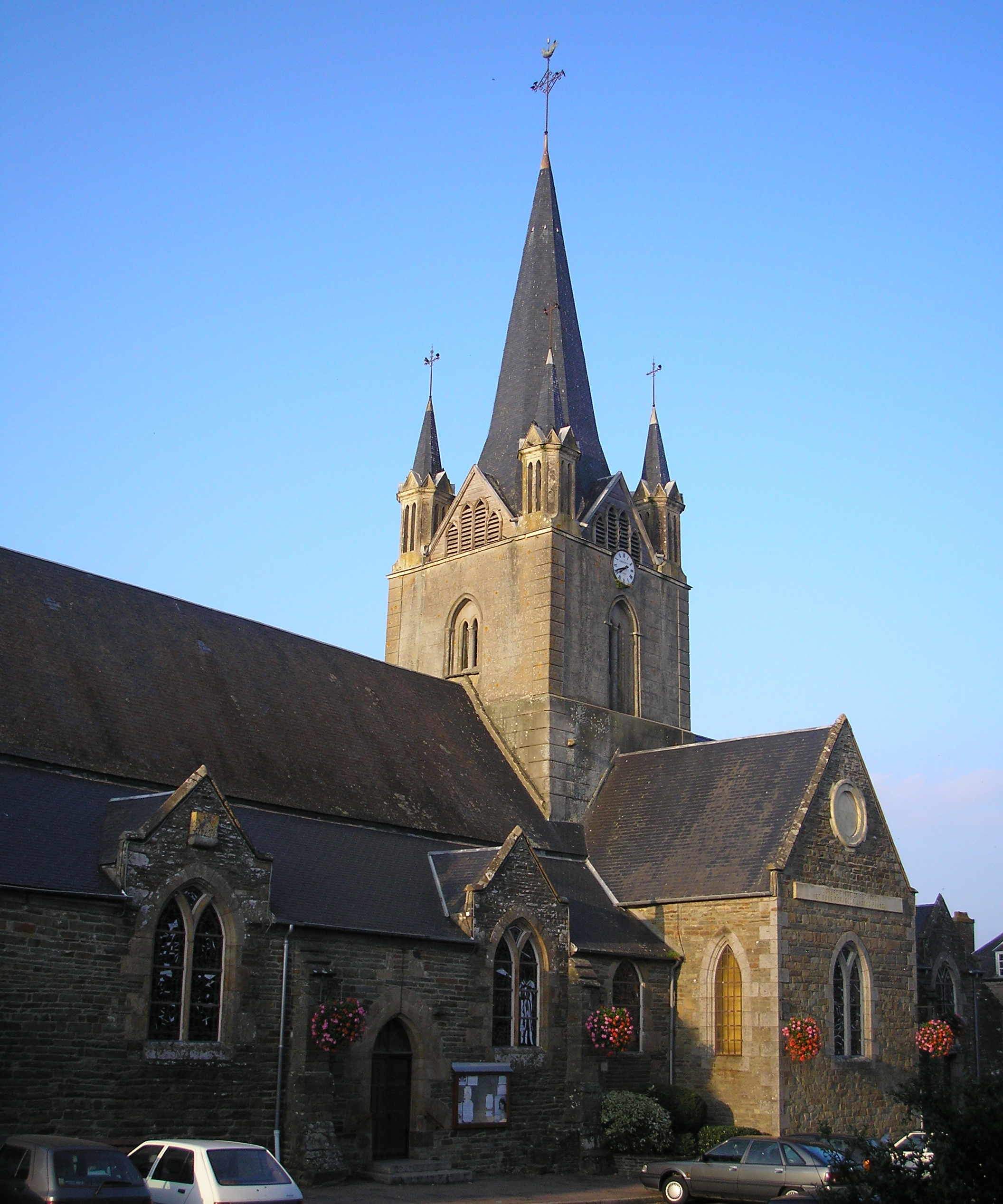
- Saint Martin Notre-Dame et Saint André

- Coat of arms
- Location of Vassy
- Location within France Location within Normandy
- Coordinates: 48°51′12″N 0°40′30″W
- Country: France
- Region: Normandy
- Department: Calvados
- Arrondissement: Vire
- Canton: Condé-en-Normandie
- Commune: Valdallière
- Area^{1}: 31.01 km^{2} (11.97 sq mi)
- Highest elevation: 260 m (850 ft)
- Lowest elevation: 103 m (338 ft)
- Population (2022): 1,686
  - Density: 54.37/km^{2} (140.8/sq mi)
- Time zone: UTC+01:00 (CET)
  - Summer (DST): UTC+02:00 (CEST)
- Postal code: 14410
- ^{1} French Land Register data, which excludes lakes, ponds, glaciers > 1 km^{2} (0.386 sq mi or 247 acres) and river estuaries.

Vassy (French pronunciation: [vasi]) is a former commune in the Calvados department in the Normandy region in northwestern France. On 1 January 2016, it was merged into the new commune of Valdallière.

It is said to be the origin of the surnames de Vesci and Vesely in England, introduced after the Norman Conquest in 1066.

== Population ==
Historical population
Year	Pop.	±% p.a.
1962	1,521	—
1968	1,410	−1.26%
1975	1,450	+0.40%
1982	1,601	+1.43%
1990	1,611	+0.08%
1999	1,649	+0.26%
2006	1,718	+0.59%
2022	1,686	−0.12%
Source: EHESS and INSEE

== See also ==
- Communes of the Calvados department
