= 6th Guards Tank Brigade =

6th Guards Armoured Brigade 6th Guards Tank Brigade 6th Guards Brigade
- Insignia of the 6th Guards Tank Brigade
- Active: 1941–1945
- Country: United Kingdom
- Branch: British Army
- Type: Armoured
- Size: Brigade
- Part of: Guards Armoured Division 1941–1942; Independent 1942–1945

The 6th Guards Tank Brigade was an armoured brigade of the British Army formed from the Foot Guards in 1941 as the 6th Guards Armoured Brigade when the United Kingdom was under the threat of invasion in Operation Sea Lion and more armoured formations were required.

== History ==
Permission was granted from King George VI and the Colonels of the Regiments involved and, over the summer of 1941, the Infantry of the Guards converted into an armoured formation and the Guards Armoured Division was formed, containing the 5th and 6th Guards Armoured Brigades, together with supporting units. The 6th Brigade, was converted from the 30th Independent (Guards) Infantry Brigade

In 1942, all British armoured divisions were reorganised to have one armoured brigade and one motorised infantry brigade. The 6th Guards Armoured Brigade thus became an independent tank brigade, being renamed as the 6th Guards Tank Brigade. The brigade, now equipped with the Churchill tank, served in the North West Europe campaign landing in Normandy on 20 July 1944.

Correspondence in Winston Churchill's The Second World War (Volume V: Closing the Ring, Annex C) in April 1944 appears to indicate that breaking the brigade up and making its personnel available as replacements for other army formations was considered. Churchill was opposed to this, and nothing appears to have been done.

The brigade went on to take part in the Battle of Normandy in Operation Bluecoat, Operation Veritable finally ending the war at Lübeck on the Baltic Sea where they captured a U-boat.

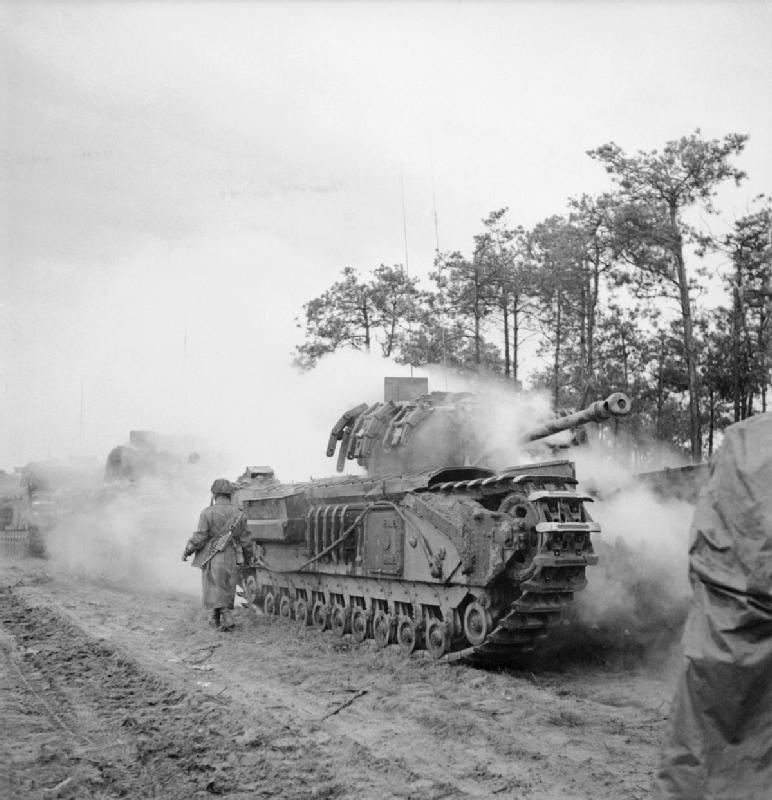
Churchill tanks of 6th Guards Tank Brigade laying a smokescreen during the advance on Venray, Netherlands, 17 October 1944

=== Order of battle ===
The 6th Guards Tank Brigade was constituted as follows during the war:

- 4th Tank Battalion Coldstream Guards
- 4th Tank Battalion Grenadier Guards
- 3rd Tank Battalion Scots Guards

Brigade Troops

- 6th Guards Tank Brigade Postal Unit, Royal Engineers

Prior to Operation Plunder and after Operations Veritable and Blackcock, the 6th Guards had units of artillery, engineer and other units added to their formation. The Brigade then became known as the 6th Guards Armoured Brigade through to V. E. Day.

=== Commanders ===
The following officers commanded 6th Guards Tank Brigade during the war:

- 15 January 1943 – 3 August 1944 Brigadier Gerald Verney
- 3–16 August 1944 Brigadier Sir Walter Bartellot, Bt
- 18 August 1944 – 2 February 1945 Brigadier Walter Greenacre

== See also ==
- British armoured formations of the Second World War
- List of British brigades of the Second World War
- Rhino tank

== See also ==
- List of British brigades of the Second World War
