= Desert (disambiguation) =

A desert is a geographic area that receives little precipitation.

Desert may also refer to:

== Places ==
- Desert, County Tyrone, a townland in County Tyrone, Northern Ireland, United Kingdom
- Desert, Texas, an unincorporated community in Collin County, Texas, United States

== Places bereft of some resource ==
- Banking desert
- Book desert
- Desert (particle physics), a theorized gap in energy scales, in which no new physics appears
- Food desert

== Arts, entertainment, and media ==
=== Music ===
- Desert (English band), an English electronic and house music duo
- "Desert" (Émilie Simon song), a 2002 song from her 2002 album, Émilie Simon.
- "Desert" (Paces song), a 2016 song by Australian musician Paces featuring Guy Sebastian from their 2016 album, Vacation.
- "Desert", by D'espairsRay from Mirror
- Déserts, a musical composition by Edgard Varese
- Le désert, an ode-symphonie by Félicien David
- "The Desert", by Carly Simon from Come Upstairs
- "The Desert", by Pseudo Echo from Ultraviolet

=== Other arts, entertainment, and media ===
- Desert (novel), a 1980 novel by J. M. G. Le Clézio
- "The Desert" (Avatar: The Last Airbender), an episode of Avatar: The Last Airbender
- The Desert (Dragon Prince), a fictional Princedom (or country) in Melanie Rawn's Dragon Prince and Dragon Star novel trilogies
- Desert TV, a defunct Namibian television channel
- A Desert, a 2024 psychological horror film

== Other uses ==
- Desert (philosophy), the condition of being deserving of something
- Desertion, the abandonment of a duty or post without permission

== See also ==
- Deseret (disambiguation), a term in the Book of Mormon, meaning "honeybee"
- Desert people(s) of Australia
- Désert (disambiguation)
- Desertserges, or An Díseart, a parish in County Cork, Ireland
- Dessert, a usually sweet course that concludes a meal
