= Charles-Julien Lioult de Chênedollé =

French poet

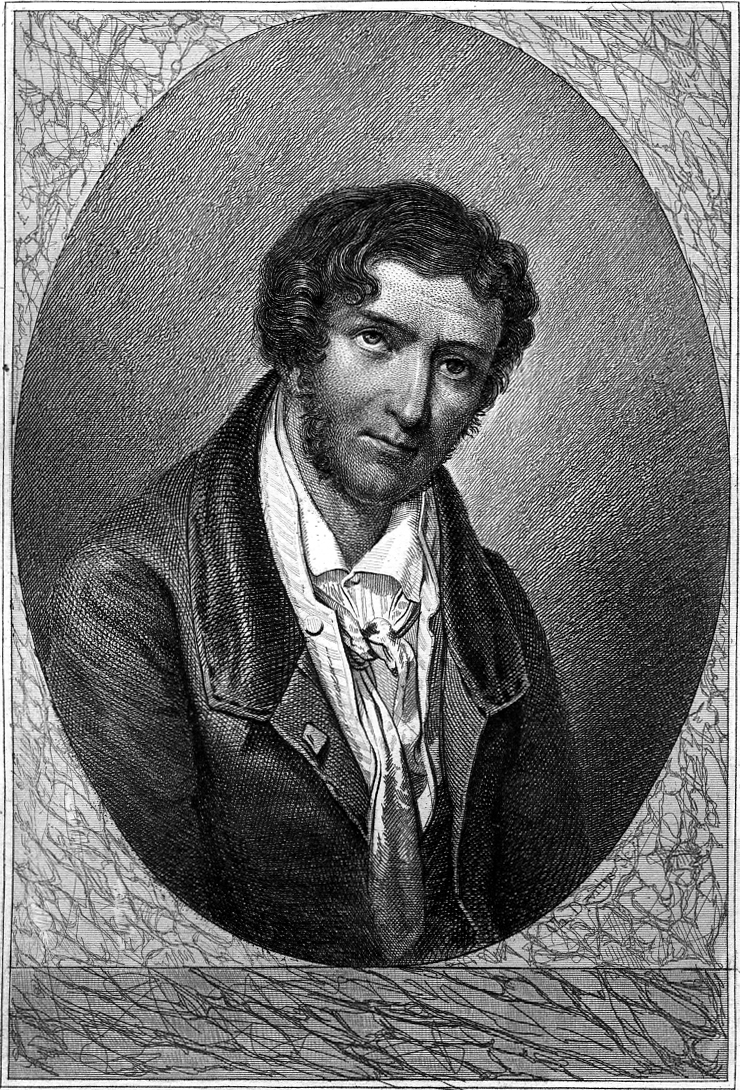
- Engraving by Charles Devrits
- Born: 4 November 1769; Vire, Calvados
- Died: 2 December 1833 (aged 64); Burcy, Calvados
- Citizenship: France
- Occupation: Poet
- Writing career
- Language: French

Charles-Julien Lioult de Chênedollé (French pronunciation: [ʃaʁl ʒyljɛ̃ lju də ʃɛndɔle]; 4 November 1769 – 2 December 1833) was a French poet.

== Life ==
He was born at Vire (Calvados). His father was a member of the revenue court of Normandy. He early showed a vocation for poetry, but the outbreak of the French Revolution temporarily diverted his energy.

Emigrating in 1791, he fought two campaigns in the army of Condé, and eventually found his way to Hamburg, where he met Antoine de Rivarol, of whose brilliant conversation he has left an account. He also visited Madame de Staël in her retreat at Coppet.

On his return to Paris in 1799 he met Chateaubriand and his sister Lucile (Mme de Caud), to whom he became deeply attached. After her death in 1804, Chênedollé returned to Normandy, where he married Aimée de Banville on 4 June 1810. He eventually became inspector of the academy of Caen (1812–1832). With the exception of occasional visits to Paris, he spent the rest of his life in his native province. He died at the château de Coisel, and was buried in Burcy's cemetery.

He published his Genie de l'Homme in 1807, and in 1820 his Etudes poétiques, which had the misfortune to appear shortly after the Meditations of Lamartine, so that their originality was unrecognized. Chênedollé was sympathetic with the romantics, and was a contributor to their organ, the Muse française. His other works include the Esprit de Rivarol (1808) in conjunction with François-Joseph-Marie Fayolle.

The works of Chênedollé were edited in 1864 by Sainte-Beuve, who drew portraits of him in his Chateaubriand et son groupe and in an article contributed to the Revue des deux mondes (June 1849). See also E Helland, Étude biographique et littéraire sur Chênedollé (1857); and Cazin, Notice sur Chênedollé (1869).

== Bibliography ==
- Le Génie de l’homme, poëme, Paris, Nicolle, 1807.
- Études poétiques, Paris, Charles Gosselin, 1822.
- Le Château de Domfront : poème, Domfront, Crestey, 1829.
- Introduction à l’histoire de la poésie française, Rouen, Herment, 1810.
- Œuvres complètes de Charles de Chênedollé, Éd. Charles-Augustin Sainte-Beuve, Paris, Didot, 1864.
