= Petrus Crabbe =

16th century editor of church council documents

Petrus Crabbe or Pierre Crabbe (1470–1553) was a Franciscan friar at the friary in Mechelen (Malines) in Belgium, where he became lector and librarian. In 1532 he was requested to prepare a collection of documents from the church councils, by first Pope Leo X and then Clement VII. In order to do so, he visited more than 500 libraries to locate copies. His work was published at Cologne in 1538, in two heavy volumes, under the title of Concilia Omnia, tam generalia quam particularia. This included documents for both general and local councils, and is considered the first serious edition of this material. The book was widely used by Luther and other disputants in the Reformation.

He also started work on a bibliography of published works of classical writers, but this was never published and any manuscript is lost.
