= Saint-Charles-de-Percy =

- Part of Valdallière
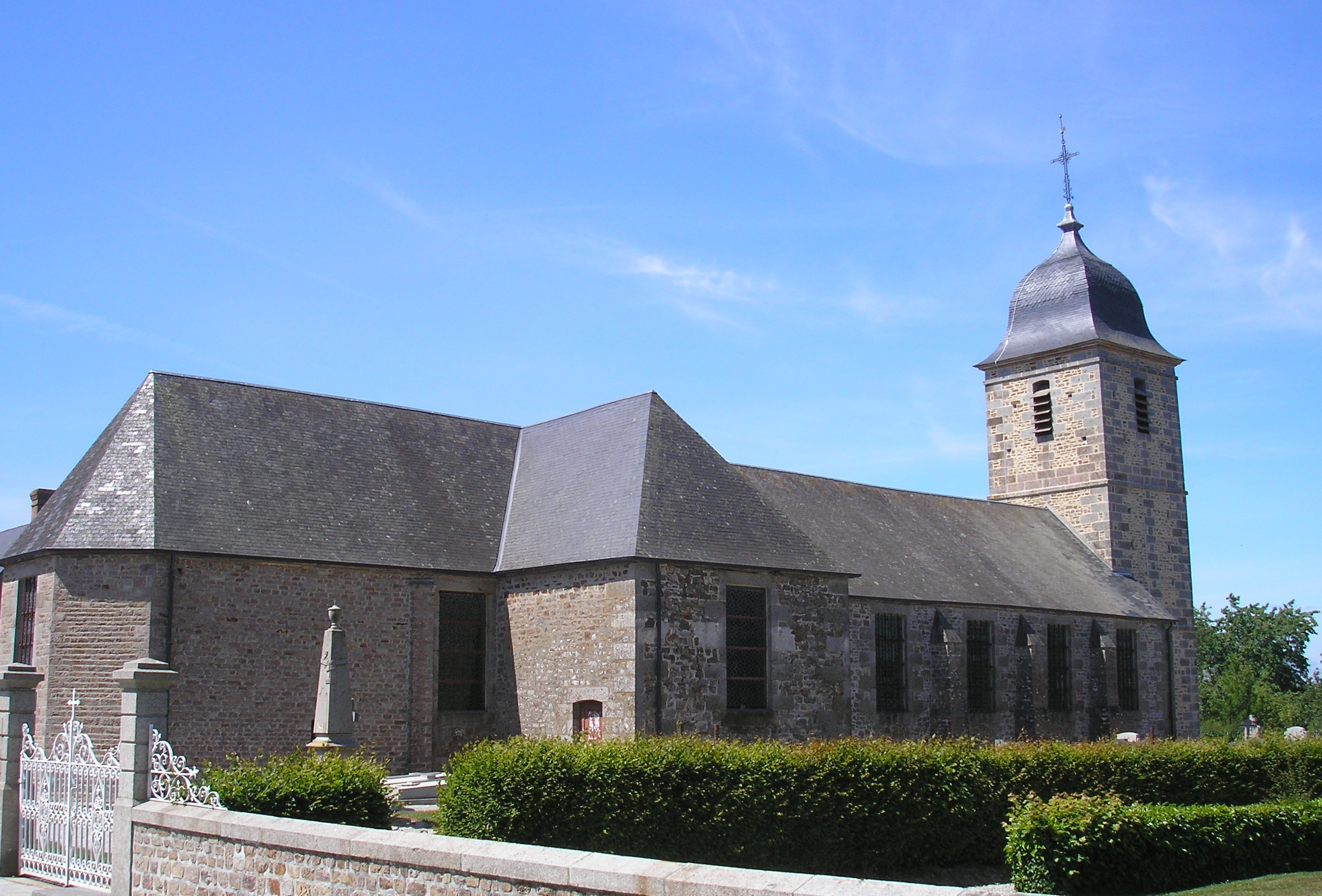

- Coat of arms
- Location of Saint-Charles-de-Percy
- Location within France Location within Normandy
- Coordinates: 48°55′31″N 0°47′15″W
- Country: France
- Region: Normandy
- Department: Calvados
- Arrondissement: Vire
- Canton: Condé-en-Normandie
- Commune: Valdallière
- Area^{1}: 6.61 km^{2} (2.55 sq mi)
- Elevation: 160 m (520 ft)
- Highest elevation: 245 m (804 ft)
- Lowest elevation: 134 m (440 ft)
- Population (2023): 200
  - Density: 30/km^{2} (78/sq mi)
- Time zone: UTC+01:00 (CET)
  - Summer (DST): UTC+02:00 (CEST)
- Postal code: 14350
- ^{1} French Land Register data, which excludes lakes, ponds, glaciers > 1 km^{2} (0.386 sq mi or 247 acres) and river estuaries.

Saint-Charles-de-Percy (French pronunciation: [sɛ̃ ʃaʁl də pɛʁsi]) is a former commune in the Calvados department in the Normandy region in northwestern France. On 1 January 2016, it was merged into the new commune of Valdallière.

== See also ==
- Communes of the Calvados department
