= Le Désert =

- Part of Valdallière
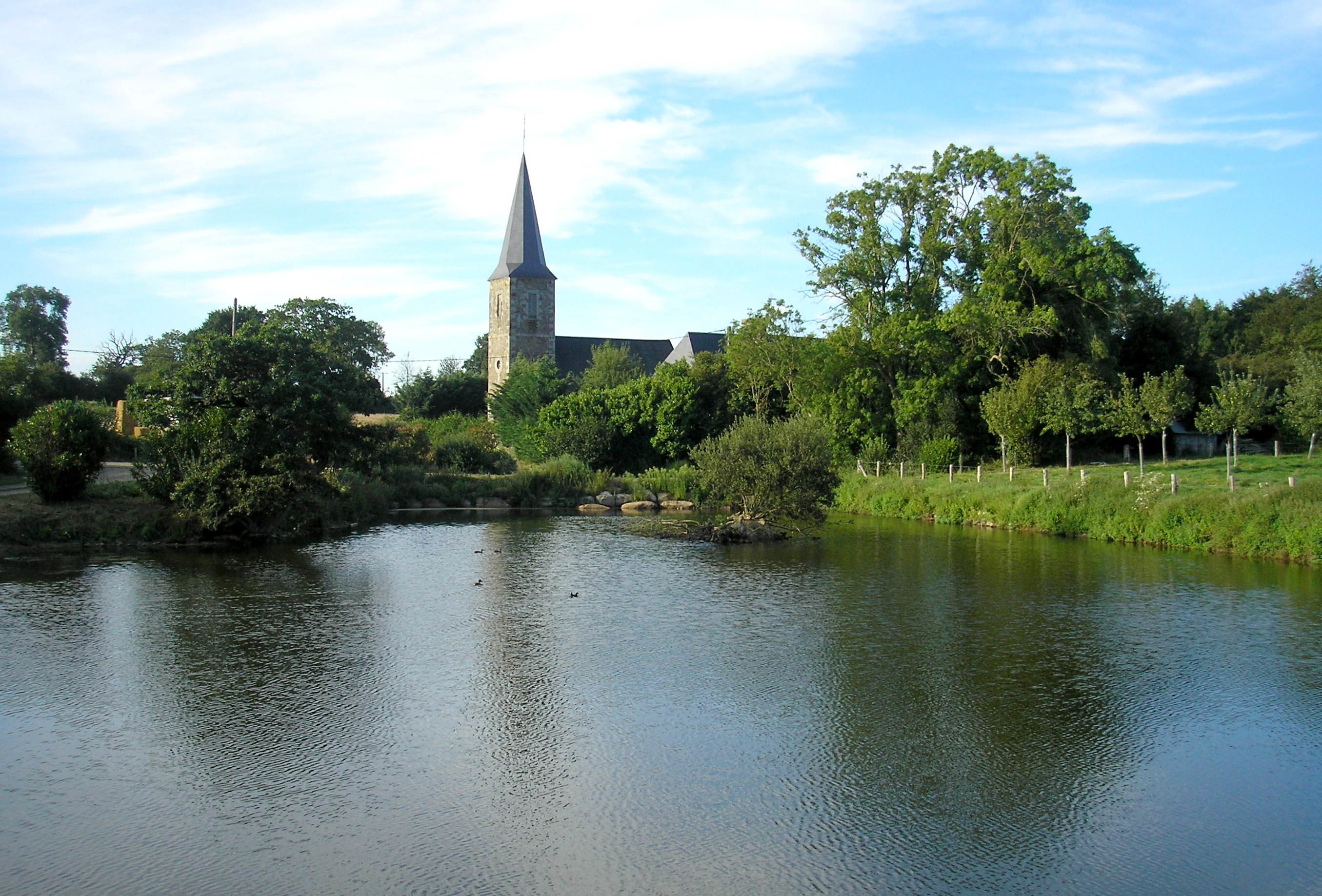

- Coat of arms
- Location of Le Désert
- Location within France Location within Normandy
- Coordinates: 48°54′22″N 0°48′38″W
- Country: France
- Region: Normandy
- Department: Calvados
- Arrondissement: Vire
- Canton: Condé-en-Normandie
- Commune: Valdallière
- Area^{1}: 3.88 km^{2} (1.50 sq mi)
- Elevation: 120 m (390 ft)
- Highest elevation: 186 m (610 ft)
- Lowest elevation: 132 m (433 ft)
- Population (2023): 79
  - Density: 20/km^{2} (53/sq mi)
- Time zone: UTC+01:00 (CET)
  - Summer (DST): UTC+02:00 (CEST)
- Postal code: 14350
- ^{1} French Land Register data, which excludes lakes, ponds, glaciers > 1 km^{2} (0.386 sq mi or 247 acres) and river estuaries.

Le Désert (French pronunciation: [lə dezɛʁ]) is a former commune in the Calvados department in the Normandy region in northwestern France. On 1 January 2016, it was merged into the new commune of Valdallière.

== See also ==
- Communes of the Calvados department
