= Marguerin de la Bigne =

French theologian, patrologist, and publisher

- Coat of Arms for the La Bigne family
- Born: 1546; Bernières-le-Patry
- Died: 1595 or 20 november 1597; Paris
- Education: University of Caen Normandy & Sorbonne University
- Occupations: Theologian and patrologist

Marguerin de la Bigne was a French theologian and patrologist and first publisher of the complete works of Isidore of Seville.

== Biography ==
He studied at the College of Caen, and at the Sorbonne in Paris where he received the doctorate. He was named canon of his native Diocese of Bayeux and, later, dean of the church of Mans. At the Provincial Council of Rouen, in 1581, he sustained the rights of his cathedral chapter against Bernadin de St. François, Bishop of Bayeux, and provoked a conflict with the latter which ended in de la Bigne's resignation from his canonry.

He resumed, then, at the Sorbonne the patristic studies in which he had been long engaged. He perceived Protestants as threatening Catholic interests by misquoting and misinterpreting patristic texts, and therefore resolved to collect and edit the available documents of the Church Fathers. He published in 1575 his "Sacra Bibliotheca Sanctorum Patrum" (Paris, 8 vols.; additional volume in 1579; later editions, Paris, 1589; Lyons, 27 vols., 1677; Cologne, 1694). It contains the writing, some complete, some fragmentary, of two hundred Church Fathers, many published for the first time. The Catholic Encyclopedia characterizes this work as the pioneer in the field of critical patristics.

He published, also "Statuta Synodalia Parisiensium Episcoporum, Galonis Adonis et Willilmi; item Decreta Petri et Galteri, Senonensium Episcoporum" (Paris, 1578); and an edition of Isidore of Seville (Paris, 1580), in which for the first time the latter's works were gathered in one work.
