= Burcy, Calvados =

Burcy
- Part of Valdallière
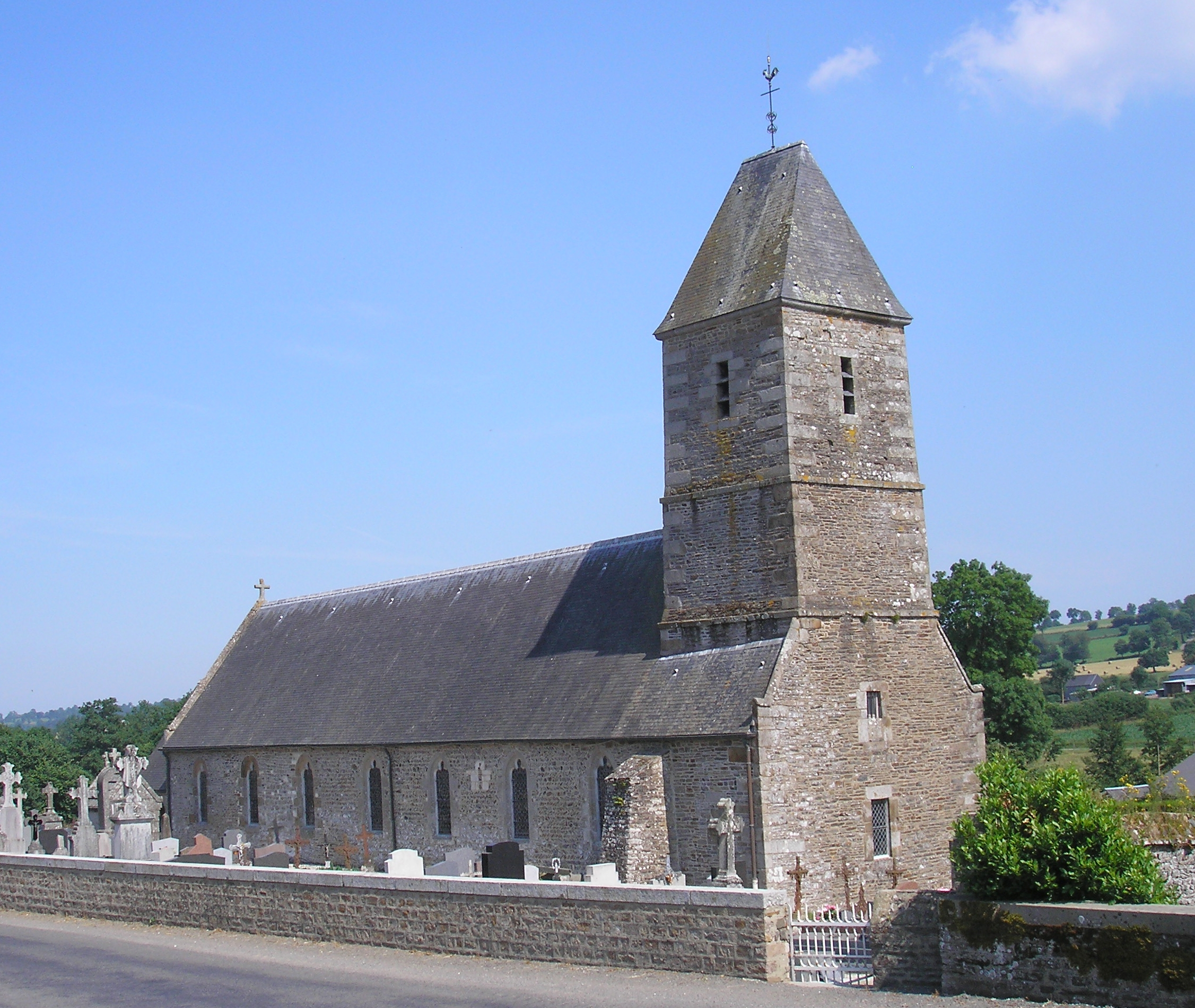
- Location of Burcy
- Location within France Location within Normandy
- Coordinates: 48°52′06″N 0°48′05″W
- Country: France
- Region: Normandy
- Department: Calvados
- Arrondissement: Vire
- Canton: Condé-en-Normandie
- Commune: Valdallière
- Area^{1}: 11.52 km^{2} (4.45 sq mi)
- Elevation: 125 m (410 ft)
- Highest elevation: 247 m (810 ft)
- Lowest elevation: 115 m (377 ft)
- Population (2023): 377
  - Density: 32.7/km^{2} (84.8/sq mi)
- Time zone: UTC+01:00 (CET)
  - Summer (DST): UTC+02:00 (CEST)
- Postal code: 14410
- ^{1} French Land Register data, which excludes lakes, ponds, glaciers > 1 km^{2} (0.386 sq mi or 247 acres) and river estuaries.

Burcy (French pronunciation: [byʁsi]) is a former commune in the Calvados department in the Normandy region in northwestern France. On 1 January 2016, it was merged into the new commune of Valdallière.

== See also ==
- Communes of the Calvados department
