= Chênedollé (former commune) =

- Part of Valdallière
- Location of Chênedollé
- Location within France Location within Normandy
- Coordinates: 48°51′20″N 0°45′35″W
- Country: France
- Region: Normandy
- Department: Calvados
- Arrondissement: Vire
- Canton: Condé-en-Normandie
- Commune: Valdallière
- Area^{1}: 6.91 km^{2} (2.67 sq mi)
- Elevation: 309 m (1,014 ft)
- Highest elevation: 246 m (807 ft)
- Lowest elevation: 182 m (597 ft)
- Population (2023): 212
  - Density: 30.7/km^{2} (79.5/sq mi)
- Time zone: UTC+01:00 (CET)
  - Summer (DST): UTC+02:00 (CEST)
- Postal code: 14410
- ^{1} French Land Register data, which excludes lakes, ponds, glaciers > 1 km^{2} (0.386 sq mi or 247 acres) and river estuaries.

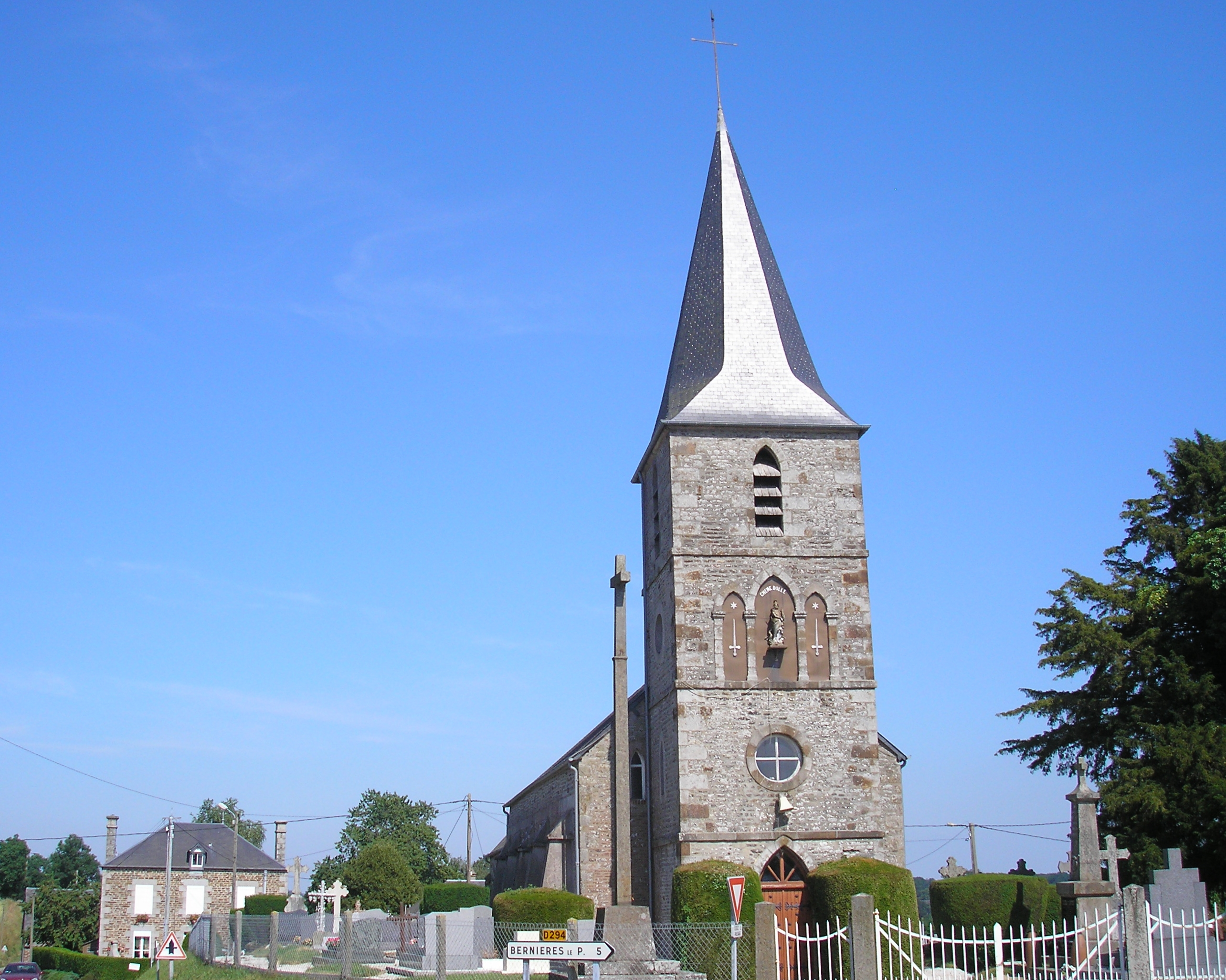
France Normandie Chenedolle Eglise

Chênedollé (French pronunciation: [ʃɛndɔle]) is a former commune in the Calvados department in the Normandy region in northwestern France. On 1 January 2016, it was merged into the new commune of Valdallière.

== See also ==
- Communes of the Calvados department
