= Le désert =

Ode composed by Félicien-César David

Le désert is an "ode-symphonie" in three parts by the French composer Félicien David with words by fellow Saint-Simonien Auguste Colin, written after the composer's stay in Egypt and the Holy Land.

The work was first performed to great acclaim at the Paris Conservatoire on 8 December 1844, conducted by Théophile Tilmant, and taken up at the Théâtre-Italien and by Berlioz. At its premiere the work was played alongside two other Saint-Simonien works also by David; Chant du Soir and Le Sommeil de Paris. David had needed to borrow 1,200 francs to pay for the orchestra and hall. David's friends and colleagues Charles Duveyrier (half brother of Mélesville) and Barthélemy Prosper Enfantin took it upon themselves to challenge a contract David had innocently signed with Escudier which had given the publisher the rights to all David's works for ever, for only 1,200 francs. Le désert was successful from its premiere and influenced the conception of works based around the orient by many other French composers. David later wrote other works in similar vein, such as his operas La perle du Brésil and Lalla-Roukh.

The work is scored for speaker, tenor solo, male chorus and orchestra. It consists of several vocal and orchestral movements, each introduced by a recitation. The different sections of the ode move from the song of the desert, arrival of a caravan, storm in the desert, calm after the storm and the caravan continuing its journey, the star of Venus, a hymn to the night, dances, sunrise, the song of the muezzin, departure of the caravan and song to Allah.

Le désert was planned to be staged as an opera at the Théâtre Lyrique to accompany La sonnambula in 1867, but these plans did not come to fruition. However, Pasdeloup in his short-lived tenure at the Théâtre Lyrique presented seven well-received concert performances in 1869–70, as well as concerts of David's symphonic ode Christophe Colomb.

Verdi used the melody of the ‘chant du muezzin’ in his ballet music for the Paris premiere of Otello in 1894. Budden also finds the influence of the dawn movement of Le désert – which Verdi had heard in Milan in 1845 – in the prologue of Attila (1846). Parts of Bizet's Les pecheurs de perles, also show the influence of Le désert, for instance in the Act 1 finale (« O dieu Brahma ») and Act 2 « De mon amie ».

Offenbach wrote music for a 'parodie' of the work entitled Citrouillard au désert, first performed at the house of the Countess Bertin de Vaux at the end of February 1846. A simple bourgeois is bored in the desert, and diverted by several choruses and dances. At the break of dawn a long crescendo leads to the tune 'Au clair de la lune'. The work was also performed at the Opéra-Comique on 27 March 1846.

David's work is mentioned in chapter XV of Jules Verne's 1886 novel Robur the Conqueror. André Gide was fond of this "likeable" piece as a teenager, as reported in his memoir Si le grain ne meurt, chapter 6. Henri Vieuxtemps made a transcription of the tenor aria "Hymne à la nuit" as La Nuit for viola and piano.

== Section listing ==
Première partie
1. Chœur: Allah! Allah!
2. Marche de la caravane
3. La tempête au désert; La caravane reprend sa marche
Deuxième partie
1. Hymne à la nuit
2. Fantaisie arabe; Danse des Almées
3. La liberté au désert
4. La rêverie du soir
Troisième partie
1. Le lever du soleil
2. Chant du muezzin
3. Le départ de la caravane
