= Bayeux war cemetery =

Military cemetery in Normandy, France

Bayeux War Cemetery
- Commonwealth War Graves Commission
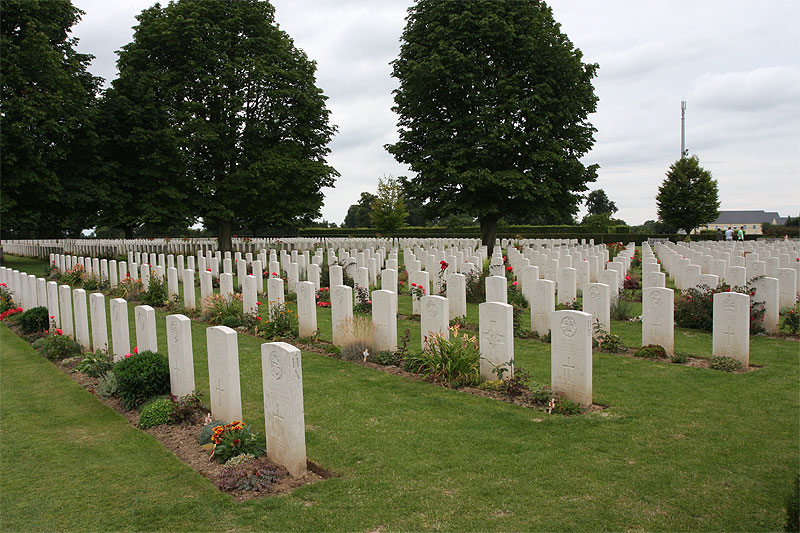
- For Operation Overlord
- Established: 1944
- Location: 49°16′25″N 00°42′52″W near Bayeux, Calvados, France
- Total burials: 4,648
- Unknowns: 1

Burials by nation
- United Kingdom: 3,935 Nazi Germany: 466; Canada: 181; Poland: 25; Australia: 17; New Zealand: 8 Russia: 7 France: 3 Czech Republic: 2 Italy: 2 South Africa: 1

Burials by war
- World War II

The Bayeux War Cemetery is the largest Second World War cemetery of Commonwealth soldiers in France, located in Bayeux, Normandy. The cemetery contains 4,648 burials, mostly from the Invasion of Normandy. Opposite this cemetery stands the Bayeux Memorial which commemorates more than 1,800 casualties of the Commonwealth forces who died in Normandy and have no known grave.

The cemetery grounds were assigned to the United Kingdom in perpetuity by France in recognition of the sacrifices made by the British Empire in the defence and liberation of France during the war. In addition to the Commonwealth burials, there are also over 500 war graves of other nationalities, the majority German.

The cemetery contains the Cross of Sacrifice or War Cross, designed by Sir Reginald Blomfield for the Commonwealth War Graves Commission (CWGC).

== History ==
The CWGC is responsible for marking and maintaining the graves of those members of the Commonwealth forces who died during the two world wars. Of the 18 Commonwealth cemeteries in Normandy containing 22,000 casualties of the invasion, Bayeux is largest.

Although there was not a particular battle fought in Bayeux itself, casualties were brought to this cemetery from around the region. This includes from field hospitals and soldiers who died on Sword Beach.

== Notable graves ==
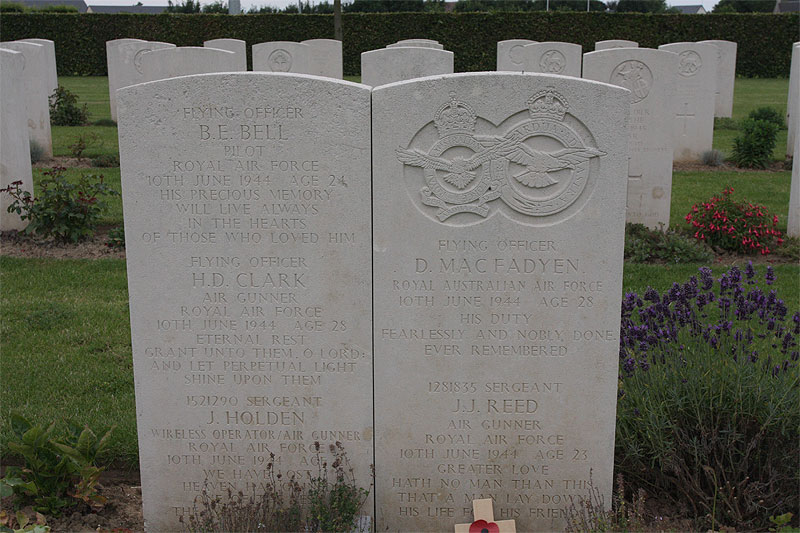
Five members of one aircrew killed in the battle are buried together in Bayeux.

British Army Corporal Sidney Bates, a member of the 1st Battalion The Royal Norfolk Regiment, was awarded the Victoria Cross for his gallant actions on 6 August 1944 near Sourdeval.

Five members of one aircrew are buried together: Royal Air Force Flying Officer B.E. Bell (pilot); Flying Officer H.D. Clark (air gunner); Sergeant J. Holden (wireless operator/air gunner); Sergeant J.J. Reed (air gunner); and Royal Australian Air Force Flying Officer D. MacFadyen. They all died on 10 June 1944.

== Bayeux Memorial ==
The Bayeux Memorial was erected in white stone facing the cemetery. The Latin epitaph along the frieze of the memorial is reference to William the Conqueror and the Invasion of England in 1066: NOS A GULIELMO VICTI VICTORIS PATRIAM LIBERAVIMUS. The translation reads: "We, once conquered by William, have now set free the Conqueror's native land."

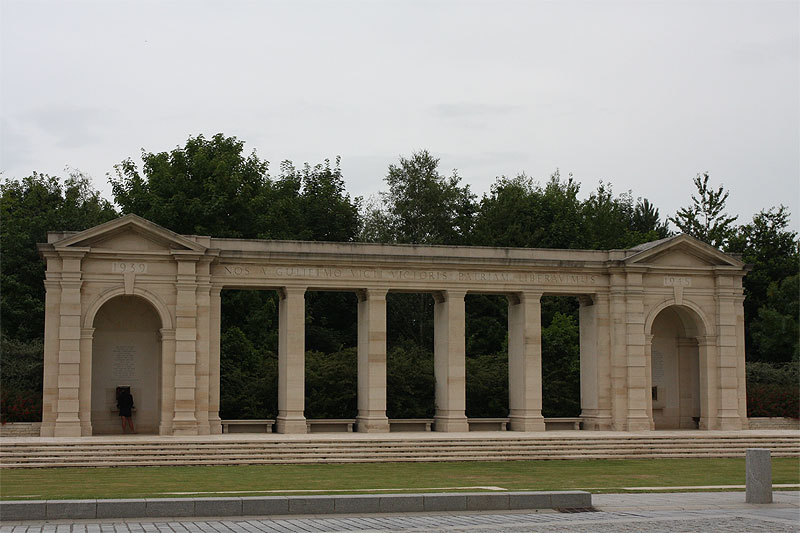
The Bayeux Memorial commemorates more than 1,800 casualties of the Commonwealth.

On this memorial are engraved the names of the 1,808 men of the Commonwealth who died in the Battle of Normandy and who have no known grave. The Bayeux Memorial in Normandy, France commemorates 270 Canadian servicemen and women.

Among the names are the 189 men of the 43rd Divisional Reconnaissance Regiment who were aboard the ill-fated MV Derrycunihy. On the night of 23 July 1944, the ship was anchored off the coast of Ouistreham (Sword Beach), and the regiment was awaiting to disembark. At 08:00 the ship's engines triggered a submerged German acoustic mine, which tore the hull apart. This was the biggest British loss of life off the Normandy beaches.

== Location ==
The cemetery is located in Bayeux, in the Calvados commune, on the Boulevard Fabian Ware (D.5). It is located 24 kilometres north-west of Caen and 13 kilometres south of Arromanches-les-Bains.

== In culture ==
The cemetery is the subject of a poem by Charles Causley, "At the British War Cemetery, Bayeux". Causley served in the Royal Navy during World War II, but not in Europe. This poem was written after his first visit to Normandy, in the summer of 1954. He stated that he had been inspired to write the piece because Bayeux was the first war cemetery he had ever visited. The theme of 'survivor's guilt' figures prominently in Causley's war poetry, and this poem is deeply affected by that condition.

== See also ==
- American Battle Monuments Commission
- UK National Inventory of War Memorials
- German War Graves Commission
- List of military cemeteries in Normandy
Pictures

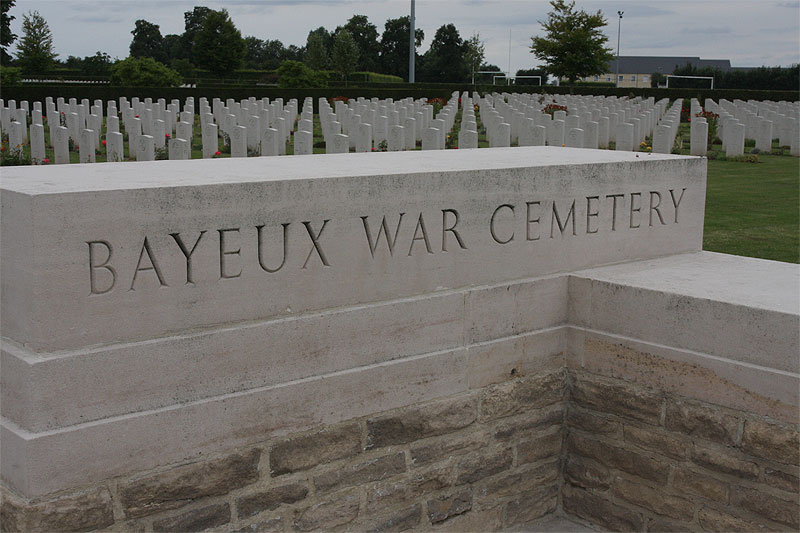
Main entrance to cemetery

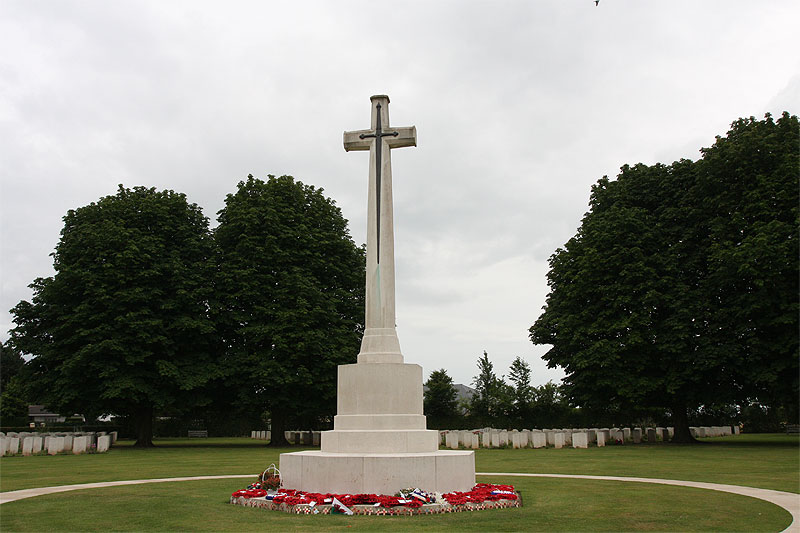
The Cross of Sacrifice

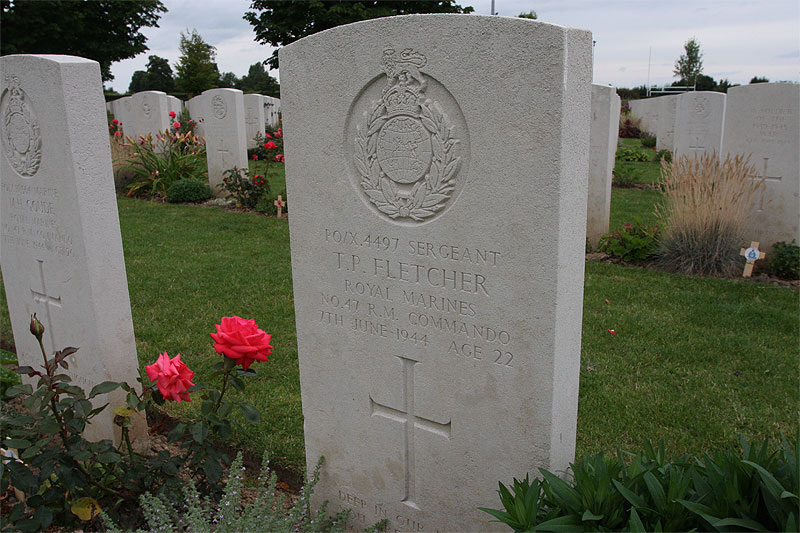
Sergeant T.P. Fletcher, Royal Marines Commando

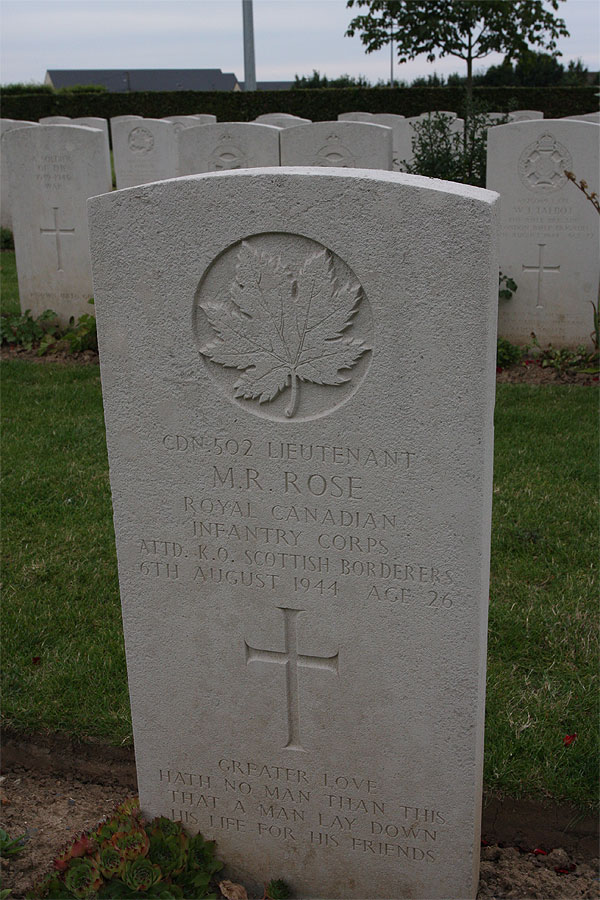
Lieutenant M.R. Rose, Royal Canadian Infantry Corps

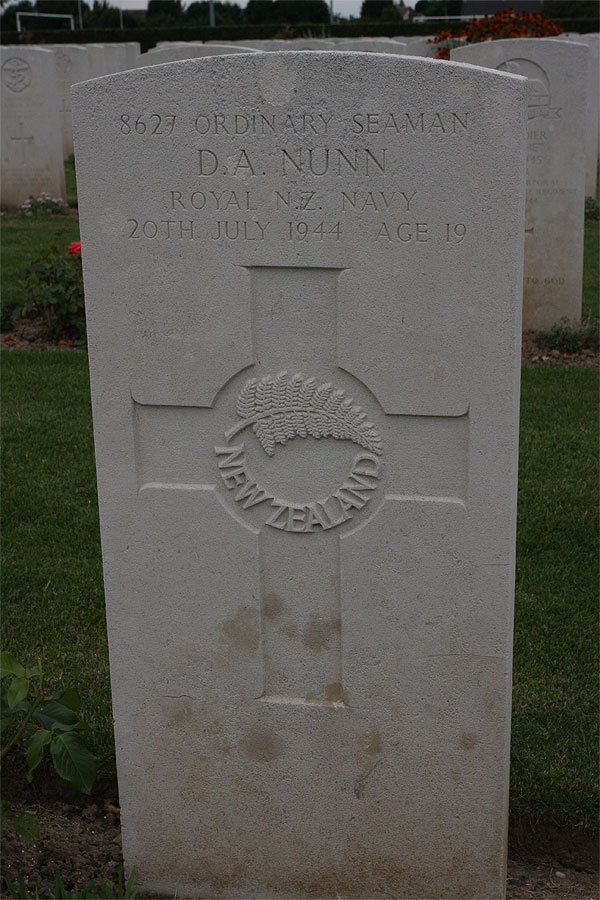
Ordinary Seaman D.A. Nunn, Royal New Zealand Navy

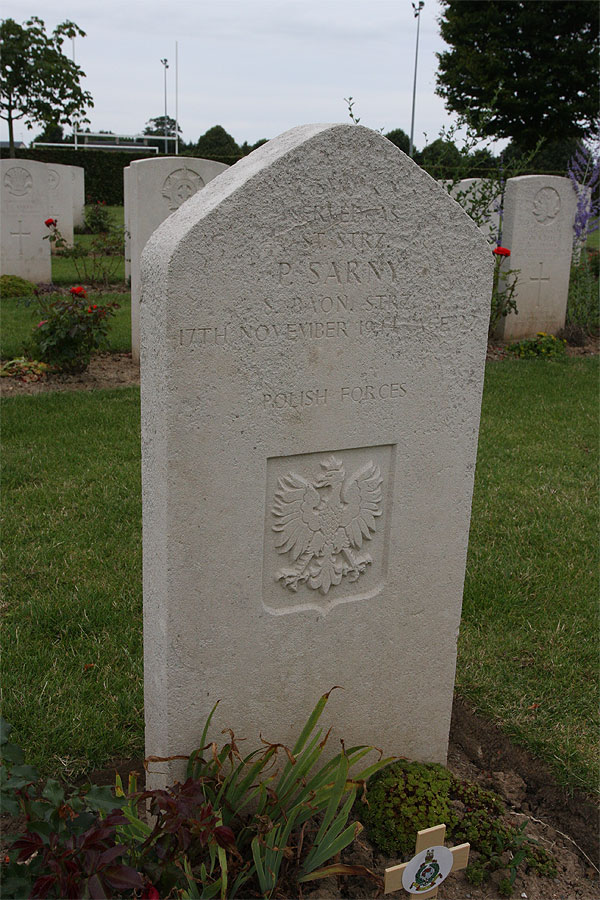
The gravestone to P. Sarny, Polish forces

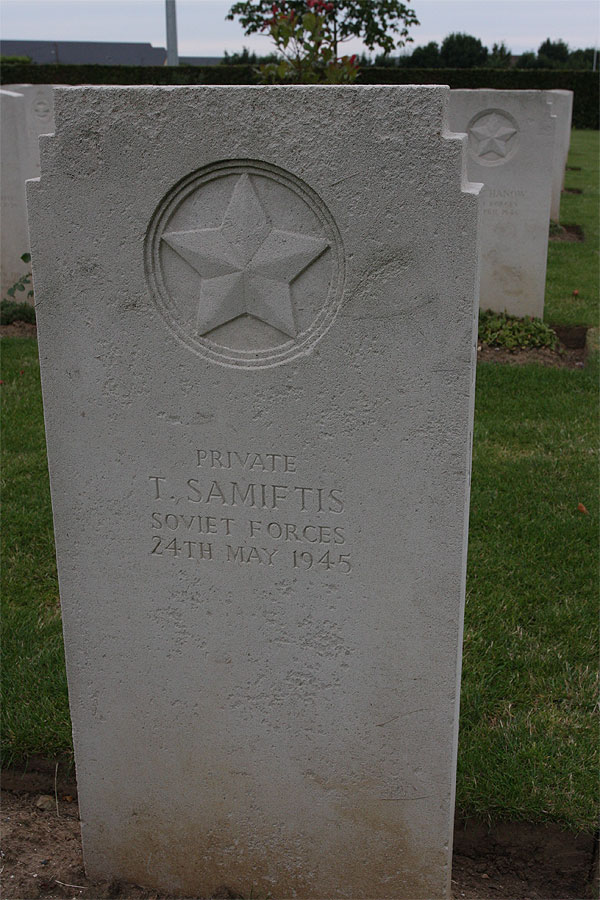
Private T. Samiftis, Soviet Forces

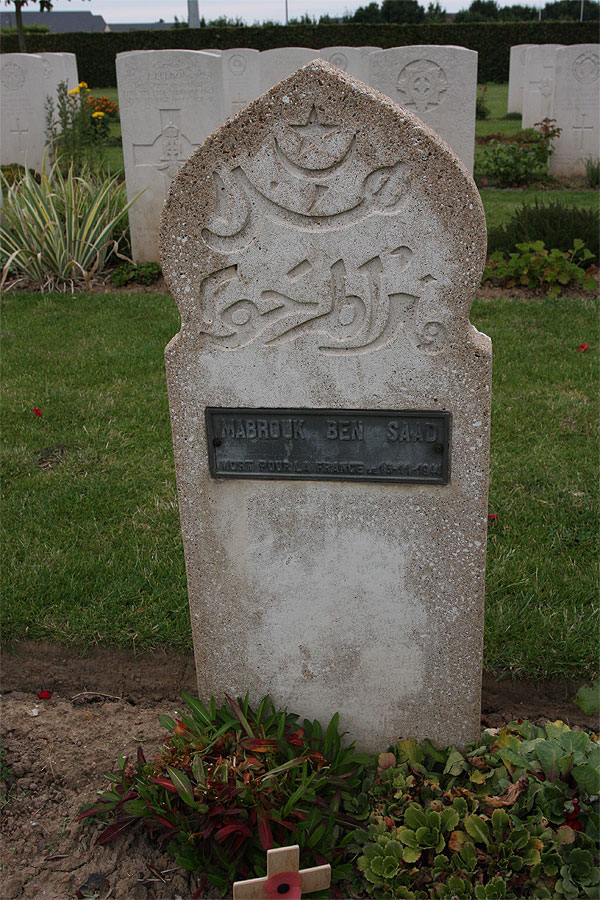
Mabrouk Ben Saad, "died for France"

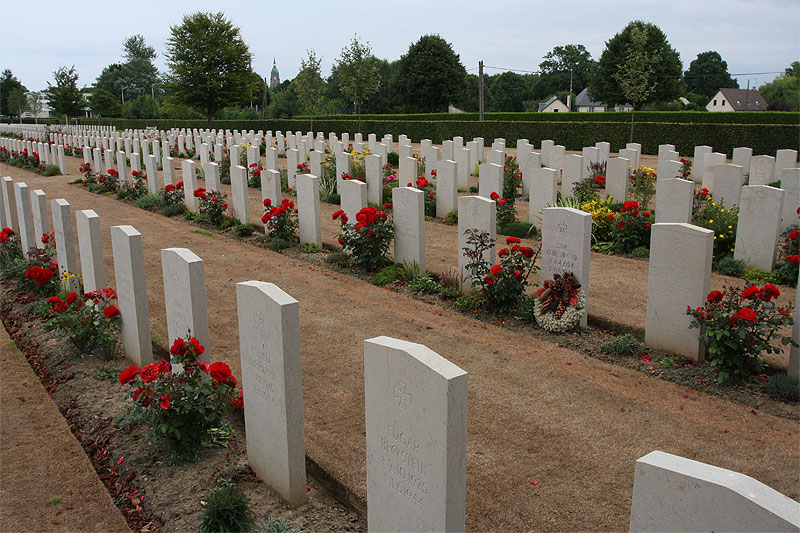
The German section of the cemetery

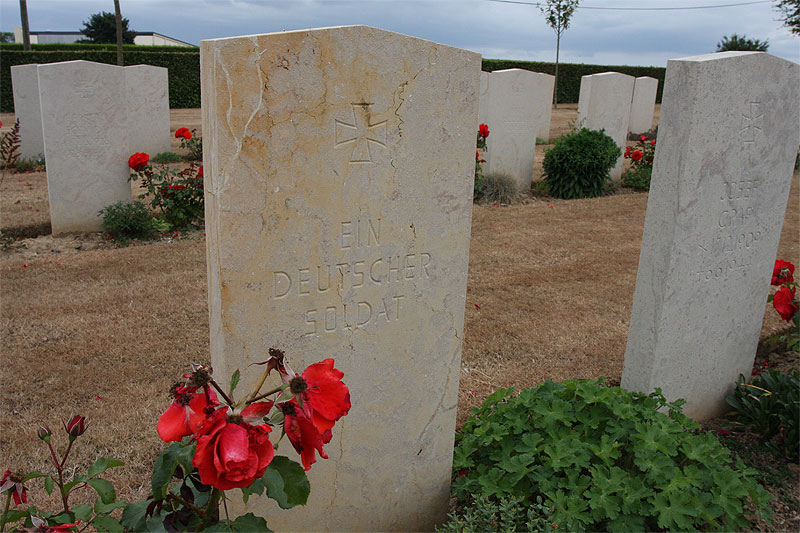
Grave of an unknown German soldier
