= George Gristock =

George Gristock VC
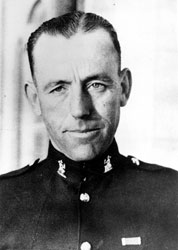
- Born: 14 January 1905; Pretoria, South Africa
- Died: 16 June 1940 (aged 35); Brighton, Sussex, England
- Burial place: Bear Road Cemetery, Brighton
- Military career
- Allegiance: United Kingdom
- Branch: British Army
- Rank: Company Sergeant-Major
- Service number: 391398
- Units: The Royal Norfolk Regiment
- Conflicts: Second World War: Western Front; French and Low Countries campaign; Battle of Belgium; Battle of the Escaut (DOW)
- Awards: Victoria Cross

George Gristock VC (14 January 1905 – 16 June 1940) was a South African serving in the British Army and recipient of the Victoria Cross, the highest and most prestigious award for gallantry in the face of the enemy that can be awarded to British and Commonwealth forces.

== Biography ==
Gristock was born and raised in Pretoria, South Africa but emigrated to the UK before the Second World War. He was 35 years old, and a Warrant Officer Class II holding the appointment of company sergeant major in 2nd Battalion, Royal Norfolk Regiment, British Army during the Second World War. During the Battle of Belgium the 2nd Battalion was part of the British Expeditionary Force.

On 21 May 1940 near the River Escaut, Belgium, south of Tournai. Company Sergeant-Major Gristock organized a party of eight riflemen and went forward to cover the company's right flank, where the enemy had broken through. He then went on with one man under heavy fire and was severely wounded in both legs, but having gained his fire position undetected, he managed to put out of action a machine-gun which was inflicting heavy casualties and kill the crew of four. He then dragged himself back to the right flank position but refused to be evacuated until contact with the battalion had been established. He later died of his wounds. The Times later reported, "By his gallant action the position of the company was secured, and many casualties prevented."

Gristock is buried at Bear Road Cemetery, Brighton, Sussex, England in the War Graves Section (Plot Z.G.L. Grave 28).

=== Victoria Cross citation ===
The announcement and accompanying citation for the decoration was published in supplement to the London Gazette on 23 August 1940.

War Office, 23rd August, 1940.

The KING has been pleased to approve of the award of the Victoria Cross to the undermentioned : —

No. 391398 Warrant Officer Class II (Company Sergeant-Major) George Gristock, The Royal Norfolk Regiment.

For most conspicuous gallantry on the 21st May 1940, when his company was holding a position on the line of the River Escaut, south of Tournai. After a prolonged attack, the enemy succeeded in breaking through beyond the company's right flank which was consequently threatened. Company Sergeant-Major Gristock having organised a party of eight riflemen from company headquarters, went forward to cover the right flank.

Realising that an enemy machine-gun had moved forward to a position from which it was inflicting heavy casualties on his company, Company Sergeant-Major Gristock went on, with one man as connecting file, to try to put it out of action. Whilst advancing, he came under heavy machine-gun fire from the opposite bank and was severely wounded in both legs, his right knee being badly smashed. He nevertheless gained his fireposition, some twenty yards from the enemy machine-gun post, undetected, and by well aimed rapid fire killed the machine-gun crew of four and put their gun out of action. He then dragged himself back to the right flank position from which he refused to be evacuated until contact with the battalion on the right had been established and the line once more made good.

By his gallant action, the position of the company was secured, and many casualties prevented. Company Sergeant-Major Gristock has since died of his wounds.

== The medal ==
Gristock's Victoria Cross is in the collection of the Royal Norfolk Regimental Museum in Norwich Castle, England.
