= Sidney Bates =

Recipient of the Victoria Cross

Sidney Bates VC
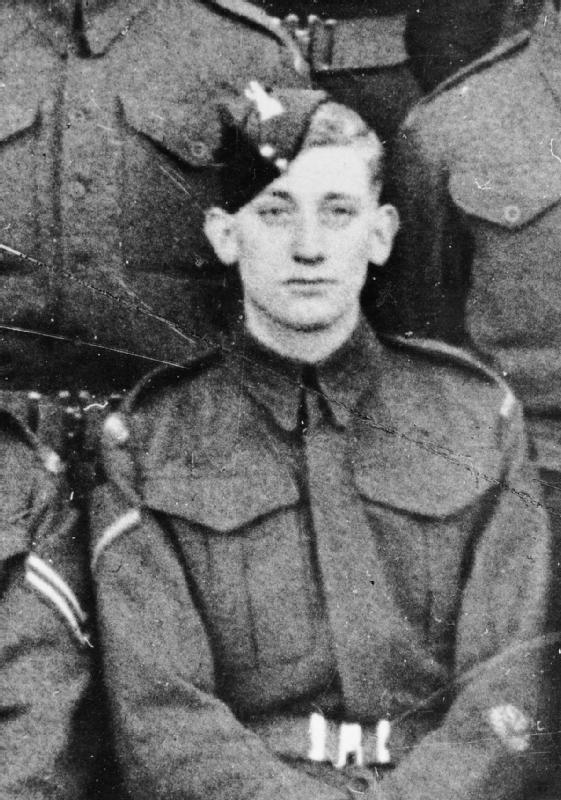
- Born: 14 June 1921; Camberwell, London, England
- Died: 8 August 1944 (aged 23); Sourdeval, German-occupied France
- Burial place: Bayeux War Cemetery, Calvados, France
- Military career
- Allegiance: United Kingdom
- Branch: British Army
- Service years: 1940–1944 †
- Rank: Corporal
- Nickname: "Basher"
- Service number: 5779898
- Units: Royal Norfolk Regiment
- Conflicts: World War II (DOW)
- Awards: Victoria Cross

Corporal Sidney Bates VC (14 June 1921 – 8 August 1944) was a British recipient of the Victoria Cross, the highest and most prestigious award for gallantry in the face of the enemy that can be awarded to British and Commonwealth forces. Upon his unit being attacked Bates charged the enemy forcing the enemy to retreat, during which he was hit several times and died later of his wounds.

== Early life ==
Sidney Bates was born in Camberwell, London, on 14 June 1921 to Frederick, a rag-and-bone man, and Gladys May Bates. At the outbreak of World War II, Bates was working as a carpenter's labourer. He joined the British Army and served with the 1st Battalion of the Royal Norfolk Regiment in June 1940 shortly after it returned from being stationed in Delhi, British India. By 1944, the battalion was part of the 185th Infantry Brigade, itself one of three brigades forming part of the 3rd Infantry Division. The battalion landed in Normandy on 6 June 1944 as part of Operation Overlord.

The 3rd Division captured Caen on 9 July during Operation Charnwood and then took part in Operation Goodwood. The division was extracted from the stalemate and assigned to Caumont-sur-Orne in Operation Bluecoat in the drive past Vire.

== Award action ==
In the afternoon of 6 August 1944 near Viessoix, France, the 1st Battalion was in the process of relieving a battalion of the Monmouthshire Regiment when an attack by units of the 10th SS Panzer Division started with an artillery barrage forcing the British infantry into shelter in their positions. Panzergrenadiers supported by "two or three" Tiger tanks came on in column then at around 200 yards deployed into lines of infantry between the tanks with both the tanks and troops firing at the British positions

Captain Dye, a witness of the events, said that in such situations under fire it was difficult to get soldiers to fire back rather than shelter and a good section commander could do so. Bates was a section commander. Bates seized a Bren light machine gun and leaving the trench charged, moving forward through a hail of bullets firing at the enemy. Dye saw him hit and fall to the ground before getting up and advancing firing again for another 40 yards. He was hit again and got up once more staggering forward for a few more yards before falling to the ground and not moving again. His actions inspired the company who started firing back. In the face of the defensive fire, the grenadier advance slowed stopped and they went to ground then started to withdraw behind the tanks. British artillery was called down on the positions and the Germans were driven off by early evening.

The stretcher bearers collected Bates finding him only 15 yards from a dead German soldier. Though he was alive he had been shot through the throat and leg and died in hospital two days later.

The final costs of fighting around Sourdeval for the Norfolks was 160 casualties out of 550. The recommendation for the award was made by Major Cooper-Key, the commanding officer of B Company of the 1st Battalion. The recommendation was turned down initially but Cooper-Key persevered. According to Sergeant George Smith the battalion had been on the march when they had come under fire. A Bren gunner had been killed next to Corporal Bates, who had immediately seized the machine gun and started firing on the enemy.

== Victoria Cross citation ==
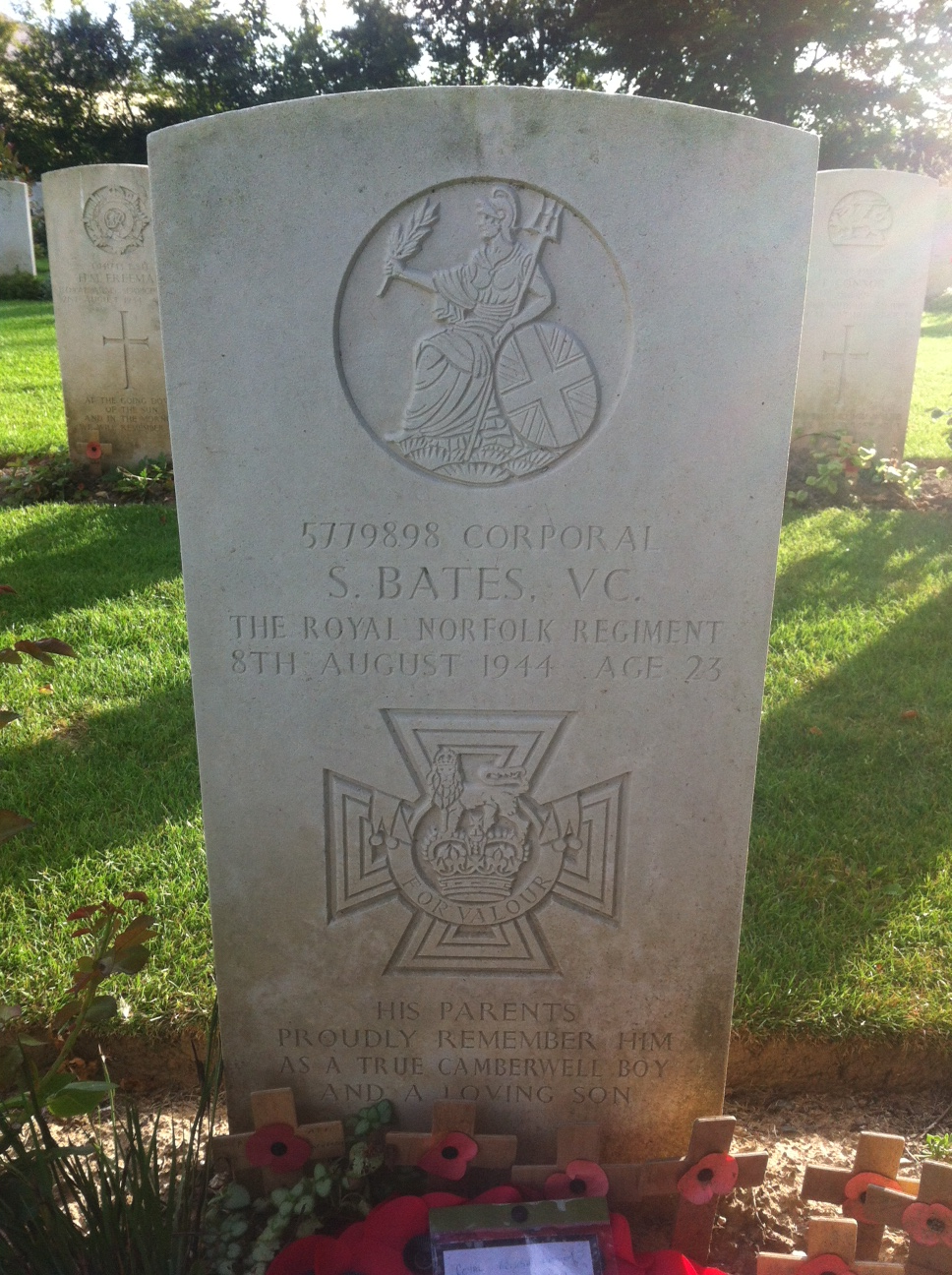
Headstone in the Bayeux Commonwealth Grave Cemetery

The announcement and accompanying citation for the decoration was published in a supplement to the London Gazette on 2 November 1945, reading

"The King has been graciously pleased to approve the posthumous awards of the Victoria Cross to:—

No. 5779898 Corporal Sidney Bates, The-Royal Norfolk Regiment (London, S.E.5).

In North-West Europe on 6th August, 1944, the position held by a battalion of the Royal Norfolk Regiment near Sourdeval was attacked in strength by 10th S.S. Panzer Division. The attack started with a heavy and accurate artillery and mortar programme on the position which the enemy had, by this time, pin-pointed. Half an hour later the main attack developed and heavy machine-gun and mortar fire was concentrated on the point of junction of the two forward companies. Corporal Bates was commanding the right forward section of the left forward company which suffered some, casualties, so he decided to move the remnants of his section to an alternative position whence he appreciated he could better counter the enemy thrust. However, the enemy wedge grew still deeper, until there were about 50 to 60 Germans, supported by machine guns and mortars, in the area occupied by the section.

Seeing that the situation was becoming desperate, Corporal Bates then seized a light machine-gun and charged the enemy, moving forward through a hail of bullets and splinters and firing the gun from his hip. He was almost immediately wounded by machine-gun fire and fell to the ground, but recovered himself quickly, got up and continued advancing towards the enemy, spraying bullets from his gun as he went. His action by now was having an effect on the enemy riflemen and machine gunners but mortar bombs continued to fall all around him.

He was then hit for the second time and much more seriously and painfully wounded. However, undaunted, he staggered once more to his feet and continued towards the enemy who were now seemingly nonplussed by their inability to check him. His constant firing continued until the enemy started to withdraw before him. At this moment, he was hit for the third time by mortar bomb splinters, a wound that was to prove mortal. He again fell to the ground but continued to fire his weapon until his strength failed him. This was not, however, until the enemy had withdrawn and the situation in this locality had been restored.

Corporal Bates died shortly afterwards of the wounds he had received, but, by his supreme gallantry and self sacrifice he had personally restored what had been a critical situation."

— London Gazette

His Victoria Cross is displayed at The Royal Norfolk Regiment Museum, Norwich. The museum trustees purchased it for £20,000 in the 1980s. His was one of five VCs won by members of the Royal Norfolk Regiment during the Second World War.

== Grave and commemoration ==
The grave of Sidney Bates can be found in the Bayeux Commonwealth War Graves Commission Cemetery, Calvados, France. (Reference 20E)

There is a memorial to Bates near Perrier Ridge at Pavée about 1 km south of the hamlet of Sourdeval named in the citation (not to be confused with the market town of Sourdeval about 20 km (12 mi) away). At the same location a block reads "In memory of the men of the 3rd Bn Monmouthshire Regt, The 1st Bn Royal Norfolk Regt and all other units who died defending this ridge against overwhelming odds, 5th to 10th August 1944."

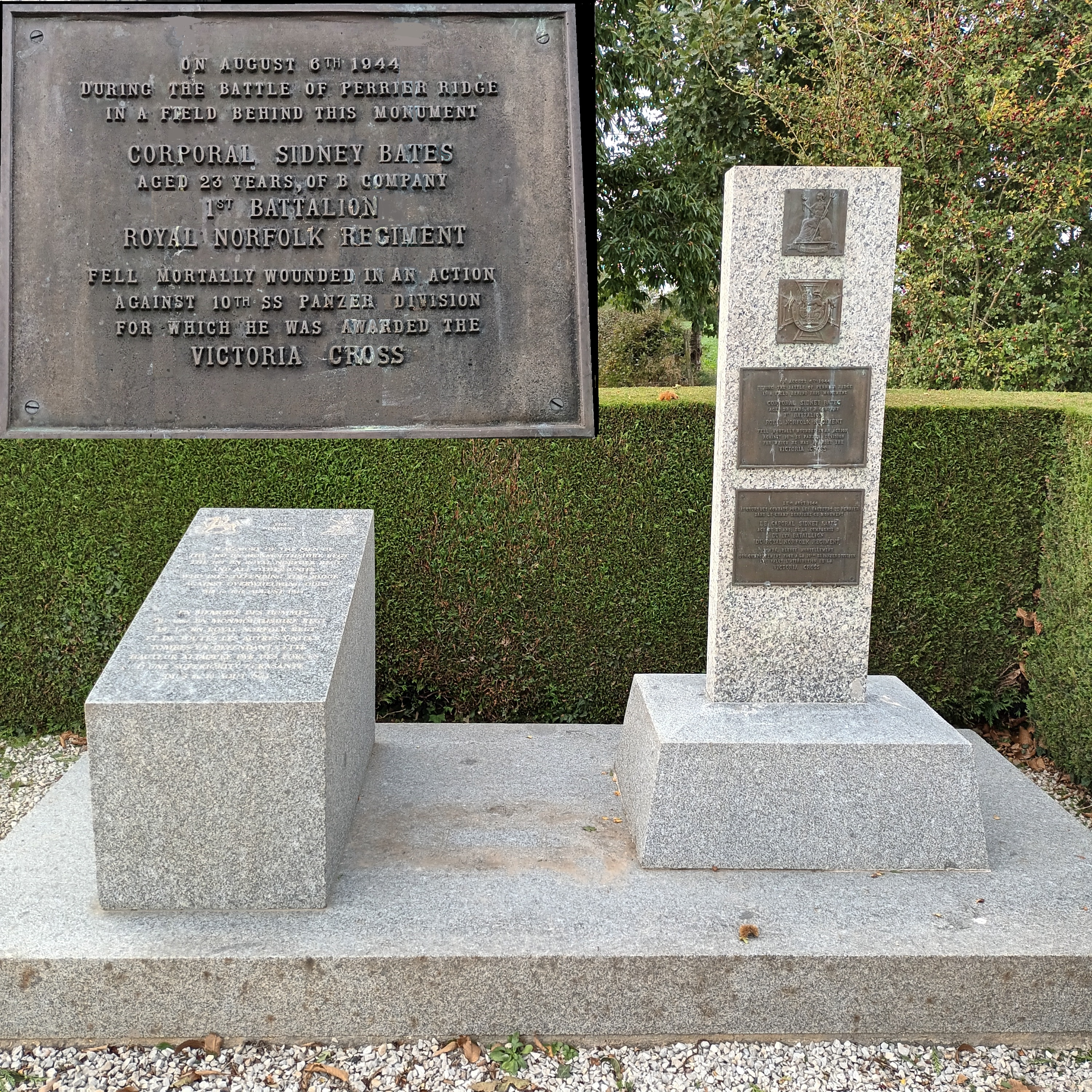
The memorial (right) to Bates at Pavée.

A street in Norwich development is named "Bates Green" in commemoration; neighbouring streets are named after other Royal Norfolk regiment recipients of the Victoria Cross.

== See also ==
- David Jamieson (VC) - an officer in 7th Battalion, awarded VC for action on 7/8 August

== Bibliography ==
- John, Laffin (1997). British VCs of World War 2: A Study in Heroism. Sutton Publishing. ISBN 0-7509-1026-7.
- Buzzell, Nora, ed. (1997) [1981]. The Register of the Victoria Cross. Cheltenham, Gloucestershire: This England Books. ISBN 0-906324-27-0.
- Harvey, David (1999). Monuments to Courage.
- Briggs, Stacia (5 June 2014). "The boy who told his mother 'I'm scared' - turned out to be amongst the bravest of them all". Eastern Daily Press.
- Carew, Tim (1967). The Royal Norfolk Regiment. Famous Regiments. Hamish Hamilton.
- Bailey, Roderick (2011) [2010]. Forgotten Voices of the Victoria Cross. Ebury.
