= John Sherwood-Kelly =

South African recipient of the Victoria Cross

Lieutenant-Colonel John Sherwood-Kelly VC CMG DSO
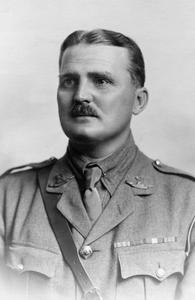
- Born: 13 January 1880; Lady Frere, Eastern Cape
- Died: 18 August 1931 (aged 51); London
- Burial place: Brookwood Cemetery; 51°18′03″N 0°37′29″W
- Military career
- Allegiance: United Kingdom
- Branch: British Army
- Service years: 1896−1919
- Rank: Lieutenant-Colonel
- Units: Norfolk Regiment
- Commands: 1st Battalion, Royal Inniskilling Fusiliers
- Conflicts: Second Boer War; Bambatha Rebellion; World War I
- Awards: Victoria Cross Companions of the Order of St Michael and St George Distinguished Service Order

Lieutenant-Colonel John Sherwood-Kelly VC CMG DSO (13 January 1880 – 18 August 1931) was a South African recipient of the Victoria Cross, the highest and most prestigious award for gallantry in the face of the enemy that can be awarded to British and Commonwealth forces. The four-times-wounded Kelly was not a Regular officer but a formidable and experienced commander with a combat record going back to the 1896 Matabele Revolt.

During his military career he achieved fame and notoriety for his mixture of heroic exploits and explosive temperament. He was awarded the Distinguished Service Order for his exploits in Gallipoli in February 1916 and on 1 January 1917 was awarded the Companion of St Michael and St George (CMG). During the summer and autumn of 1917 he commanded 1st Battalion, the Royal Inniskilling Fusiliers and was instrumental in the early success achieved during the Battle of Cambrai on 20 November for which he received the Victoria Cross from King George V at Buckingham Palace on 23 January 1918. Kelly was gassed and wounded at various times.

== Early life ==
Sherwood-Kelly was born in Queenstown in the Cape Colony (modern Eastern Cape province) to an Anglo (English-speaking) family. His father, James Kelly, was born in Newbridge, County Kildare, Ireland and settled in South Africa after serving in the British Army. His mother, Elizabeth Didcott, was born in Winchester, Hampshire and followed her husband to South Africa when he purchased a farm on the veld in the early 1870s. James Kelly served in the para-military Frontier Armed and Mounted Police, and as such the Kelly family was itinerant, moving about from one place to another in the Cape Colony. The longest period that Sherwood-Kelly stayed in one place during his youth was when his father was stationed in the area that later became Transkei.

His mother died when he was 12 and his twin brother was killed falling from a horse when he was 13. His father subsequently married their governess giving him three half-siblings. He was educated in South Africa at Grahamstown (St. Andrew's College and St Aidan's), King Williamstown (Dale College) and Queenstown (Queen's College). From his earliest years, Sherwood-Kelly was known in the words of the British historian Roderick Bailey as "an outspoken man with a fiery temper".

At the age of 16 he fought in Matebeleland. He joined the para-military Cape Mounted Police and was at the Relief of Mafeking in South Africa. During the Second Boer War, Sherwood-Kelly served as a lieutenant with the Imperial Light Horse that was used to hunt down the Boer kommandos on the veld. He joined the Somaliland Burgher Corps fighting Diiriye Guure of the Dervish State. During his time in Somaliland, Sherwood-Kelly's insubordination led him being demoted first to the rank of sergeant and then private. Upon his return to South Africa, Sherwood-Kelly went into business as the recruiter of black labour for the gold mines of the Witwatersrand and the diamond mines of the Kimberly range. In 1906 he took part in the suppression of the Bambatha Rebellion. After he was finished his service in Zululand, he married an Australian woman, Nellie, whose parents came to South Africa during the Witwatersrand Gold Rush. Prior to the outbreak of the First World War he was housemaster at Langley School, Loddon, Norfolk (England) and a member of the Territorial Force in the United Kingdom.

== First World War ==
=== Gallipoli campaign ===
In November 1914, Sherwood-Kelly was gazetted a major with the 10th Norfolk Regiment. He repeatedly requested a transfer and was sent to the King's Own Scottish Borderers in July 1915.

At the Battle of Gallipoli, he commanded a regular army Scottish battalion and, "for Distinguished Service in the Field", was awarded a DSO. He arrived on the Gallipoli peninsula in July 1915 at a time when the battle was already stalemated with the Allies unable to storm the heights of Gallipoli while the Ottomans were unable to push the Allies back into the sea. Sherwood-Kelly's nickname was "Bomb Kelly" owing to his enthusiasm for tossing Mills bombs into the Ottoman lines during the trench raids. The official history of the King's Own Scottish Borders marveled that Sherwood-Kelly "had a quite remarkable disregard for danger". On 15 October 1915, the battalion's commanding officer, Lieutenant Colonel G.B. Stoney was killed by an Ottoman shell that levelled the battalion's HQ. Captain G.S. Stirling-Cookson served as the acting commanding officer until 28 October 1915 when Sherwood-Kelly took command. The British historian Peter E. Hodgkinson noted there was a lacuna in the war diary of the King's Own Scottish Borders regarding Sherwood-Kelly who was not mentioned once between October 1915-January 1916 despite being the battalion's commanding officer, which he suggested was due to his unpopularity with his fellow officers as "an outsider and empire ranker commanding a regular unit".

=== Western Front ===
In January 1916, he arrived in France to take up service briefly as the commanding officer of the 1st Battalion, Essex Regiment. On 4 June 1916, his time on the front was cut short by a German bullet that went through his left lung, taking him out of action for much of the rest of 1916. In October 1916, he applied to join the 10th Norfolk regiment under the grounds that "some officers and many of the men present in camp who served with the 1st Battalion under my command". In March 1917, he was assigned command of the 1st Battalion, Royal Inniskilling Fusiliers.

He was 37 years old, and an Acting Lieutenant-Colonel in the Norfolk Regiment, British Army, Commanding Officer 1st Battalion, Royal Inniskilling Fusiliers during the First World War when the following deed took place for which he was awarded the VC.

On 20 November 1917 during the Battle of Cambrai at Marcoing, France, when a party of men were held upon the near side of a canal by heavy rifle fire, Lieutenant Colonel Sherwood Kelly at once ordered covering fire, personally led his leading company across the canal and then reconnoitered, under heavy fire, the high ground held by the enemy. He took a Lewis gun team, forced his way through obstacles and covered the advance of his battalion, enabling them to capture the position. Later he led a charge against some pits from which heavy fire was coming, capturing five machine-guns and 46 prisoners.

Sherwood-Kelly's citation for the VC published in 'The London Gazette on 8 January 1918 read:

"For most conspicuous bravery and fearless leading when a party of men of another unit detailed to cover the passage of the canal by his battalion were held up on the near side of the canal by heavy rifle fire directed on the bridge. Lt.-Col. Sherwood-Kelly at once ordered covering fire, personally led the leading company of his battalion across the canal and, after crossing, reconnoitred under heavy rifle and machine gun fire the high ground held by the enemy.
The left flank of his battalion advancing to the assault of this objective was held up by a thick belt of wire, whereupon he crossed to that flank, and with a Lewis gun team, forced his way under heavy fire through obstacles, got the gun into position on the far side, and covered the advance of his battalion through the wire, thereby enabling them to capture the position.
Later, he personally led a charge against some pits from which a heavy fire was being directed on his men, captured the pits, together with five machine guns and forty-six prisoners, and killed a large number of the enemy.
The great gallantry displayed by this officer throughout the day inspired the greatest confidence in his men, and it was mainly due to his example and devotion to duty that his battalion was enabled to capture and hold their objective".

In late 1917, Sherwood-Kelly survived a German gas attack that put him into the hospital. On 12 January 1918, Sherwood-Kelly arrived at Buckingham Palace to be personally awarded the VC by King George V. It was decided that he was not fit enough to return to the front and instead he returned to South Africa as part of a recruiting campaign for volunteers as South Africa only sent volunteers to fight overseas. During his visit, he caused controversy when he appeared on the stage with J. B. M. Hertzog, a Boer general turned leading Afrikaner 'republican' (i.e anti-British) politician. While standing next to Hertzog, he gave a speech calling for the Dominions like South Africa to have greater independence within the British Empire. In September 1918, he returned to the Western Front as commanding officer of the 12th Norfolk regiment, a position he held until the end of the war on 11 November 1918.

== North Russia ==
According to Field Marshal Lord Ironside's account published in 1953, the second battalion of the Hampshire Regiment on 19 June 1919 under Kelly's command as part of the North Russia Campaign "failed to take any part in the fight" at Troitsa, "a village encampment on the River Dvina and about 180 miles south-east from Archangel as the crow flies". When Ironside interviewed Kelly the following day, Kelly could not explain the 2nd Hampshires' failure to take part in the action; had Kelly been a Regular officer, explained Ironside, he would "certainly have had him court martialled." In view of Kelly's outstanding war record, Ironside merely withdrew the 2nd Hampshires from the line and directed that Kelly be sent home for demobilisation. According to the Brigade Operation Report, however, Kelly's column at Troitsa was successful at first but then withdrew as he considered the position insecure and was having difficulty obtaining ammunition supplies; when ordered to resume the attack, Kelly declined to do so.

According to Kelly's account given shortly after to his brigadier, a series of factors accounted for his withdrawal: slow and difficult approach through marshy woods, lack of information about the progress of other columns, stiff resistance by the enemy Bolsheviks, the danger of encirclement and lack of ammunition. In the event, Kelly was not relieved of his command and sent home as Ironside (in his own words) had "decided to give him a second chance." Kelly was not dismissed until 17 August 1919 and then for quite different reasons than the Troista affair.

In mid-April 1919, Sir Keith Price, a head of production at the Ministry of Munitions, wrote to the War Office urging the use of new variants of gas against the Bolsheviks in the North Russian theatre. Winston Churchill, then Secretary of State for War and Air, was enthusiastic in his support but was concerned at revealing the new gas in the course of a relatively small campaign. Churchill's concerns having been addressed, massive preparations for the use of the new gas were undertaken. As a trial of the new weapon Kelly, who was now in command of a very mixed outfit on the railway front as part of the Vologda Force, was ordered to carry out a raid on the Bolsheviks under cover of a large ground discharge of gas. Kelly objected less against the gas as against the raid itself whose purposes in his view could be achieved by other methods. The gas raid, due on 17 August 1919, never took place. Kelly was then replaced as commanding officer of his unit and sent back to Britain; the formal reason for his removal was that he had "remarked adversely on matters of military import", criticised his superiors and divulged military secrets in a letter to a friend in England; the contents of the letter constituted a court martial offence.

On his arrival back in Britain, Kelly wrote a series of letters to the Daily Express and Sunday Express, both published by Lord Beaverbrook and both opposed to the North Russia Campaign. The first letter appeared on 6 September 1919 in the Daily Express. In his letter, Sherwood-Kelly wrote that he had volunteered in April 1919 for service in Russia "in the sincere belief that relief was urgently needed in order to make possible the withdrawal of low category troops, in the last stages of exhaustion, due to fierce fighting amid the rigors of an Arctic winter". Upon arriving in Archangel, Sherwood-Kelly wrote that he "received the impression that the policy of the authorities was not what it was stated to be" and that "the troops of the Relief Force which we were told had been sent out for defensive purposes were being used for offensive purposes, on a large scale and far into the interior, in furtherance of some ambitious plan of campaign the nature of which we were not permitted to know". Sherwood-Kelly also wrote that the "much vaulted 'loyal Russian army', was composed largely of Bolshevik prisoners dressed in khaki, it was utterly unreliable, ever disposed to mutiny, and always constituted a greater danger to our troops than the Bolsheviks opposed to them". Finally, Sherwood-Kelly charged that many of the British, Australian, and Canadian soldiers did not understand why they were fighting the Red Army above the Arctic Circle after the armistice had ended the First World War. A War Office spokesman published a rebuttal, only for the Daily Express to publish an interview given by Ironside in June 1919, in which he spoke of plans to advance deep into Russia. The interview had been published in the Gazette of the Archangel Forces newspaper and had been banned by the government, but Sherwood-Kelly leaked a copy to the Daily Express.

Urgent consultations within government as to a possible court martial for Kelly followed the publication.

"A court martial would be an unusual disciplinary procedure for an officer, rare for one of Kelly's rank, unprecedented for one so well decorated, four times wounded (twice gassed) and nine times mentioned in despatches."

Initially the Adjutant General advised against a court martial, suggesting instead that Kelly be removed from the army administratively for misconduct as permitted by an article of the Pay Warrant. However, after the publication by Beaverbrook of a second Kelly letter Churchill favoured Kelly's swift court martial for writing to the newspapers but without reference to anything which had happened or was alleged to have happened in Russia. Kelly was arrested on 13 October 1919; his court martial took place on 28 October 1919 in Westminster Guildhall on the charge of having written three letters to the press on 5 September, 12 September and 6 October 1919 after his return from Russia. Kelly pleaded guilty to contravention of the King's Regulations which provided that an officer was,

"forbidden to publish in any form whatsoever or communicate, either directly or indirectly, to the Press any military information or his views on any military subject without special authority."

Many of the men serving in North Russia approved of Sherwood-Kelly's actions. Petty Officer Reginald Jowett, serving abroad the Royal Navy aircraft carrier HMS Pegasus, wrote in his diary: "Lt. Colonel Sherwood Kelly's scathing indictment of the Government's policy, published in the papers about Sept 8th, which have just reached us, is causing a good deal of comment around here, as we all know how true it is. The 'High Official' of the War Office, who terms his statements as "biased and unfounded" is that peculiar animal known as the "armchair critic", who has probably never been within a thousand miles of Archangel. To those of us who have been here, his statements against Kelly simply makes him look foolish, but I expect he is just trying to shield the Gov't as usual...All the men who have been up-river are unanimous in declaring that the conditions spoken of by Lt. Colonel Kelly in his articles in the newspapers are absolutely so, so I wonder how the High Official of the War Office would answer all these witnesses".

Kelly presented a plea in mitigation and various documents to support his case. He concluded,

"I plead with you to believe that the action I took was to protect my men's lives against needless sacrifice and to save the country from squandering wealth it could ill afford."

He was found guilty and severely reprimanded. Two weeks later he relinquished his commission, being allowed to retain the rank of lieutenant-colonel. Pursued by a neglected wife and various creditors, he was unsuccessful in his many attempts to re-enter the army and even failed to obtain a place in the French Foreign Legion.

== Politics ==
During the political instability of 1923–24, Jack Kelly stood for the Conservative Party at two general elections for the constituency of Clay Cross in Derbyshire. His controversial and outspoken style struck a chord even among hardened socialist supporters in this largely mining seat. He was defeated in the December 1923 elections by 6,000 votes but had reduced this by half a year later in the election of October 1924. During the election rallies, Kelly again hit the national headlines having thrashed some hecklers at Langwith.

== Later work ==
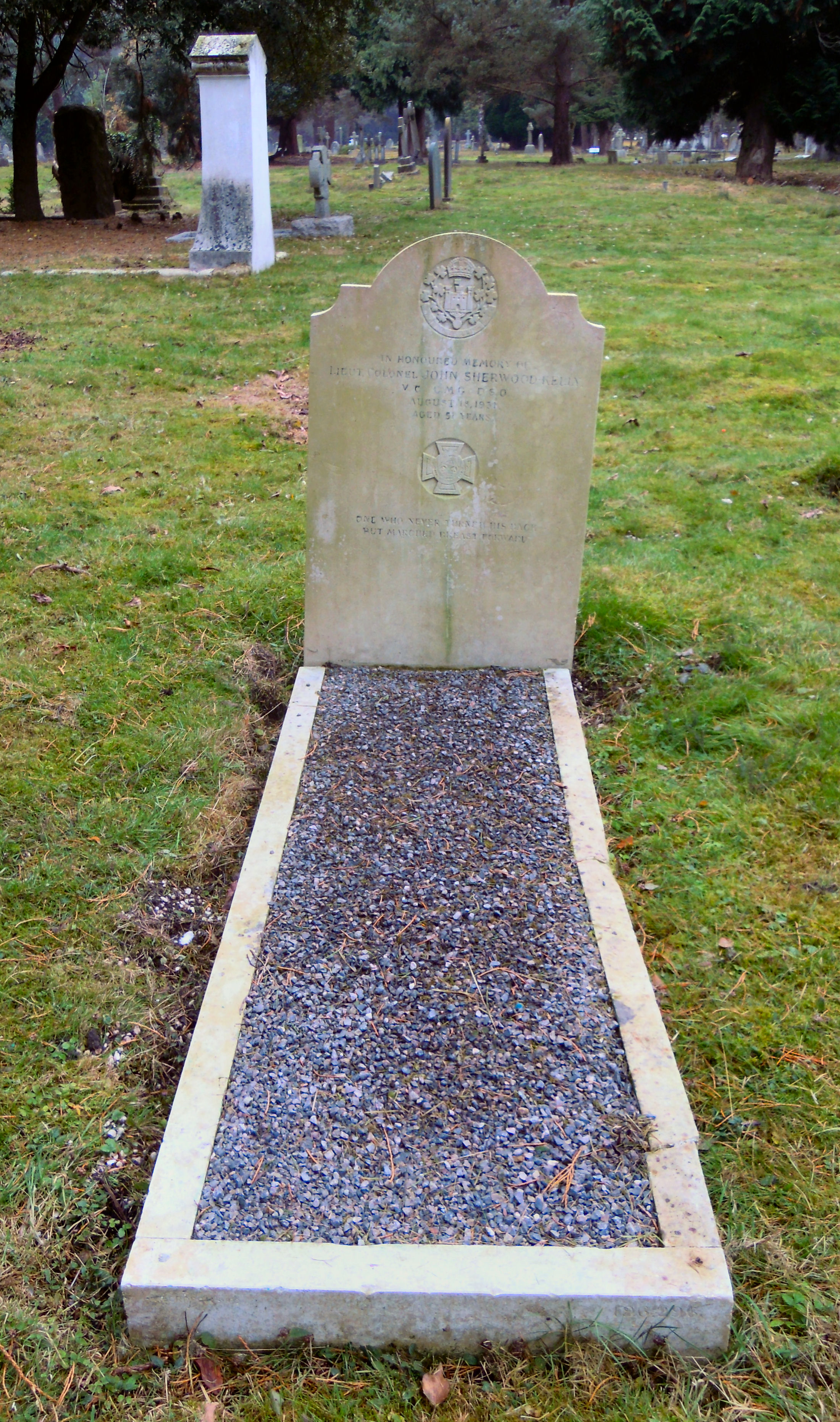
Sherwood-Kelly's grave in Brookwood Cemetery, Surrey.

In later years, Kelly worked for Bolivia Concessions Limited building roads and railways across Bolivia and went big game hunting in Africa where he contracted malaria, from which he subsequently died on 18 August 1931, aged fifty-one. He was granted a full military funeral and buried at Brookwood Cemetery in Surrey, England.

The funeral took place on the 21st and the coffin arrived at Brookwood Station at 12.30 and was met by a gun carriage provided by Aldershot Command, who also provided a Union Jack. London District provided a bearer party, together with two buglers. There was, however, no band. The 18-lb gun carriage was manned by men from the RFA, and the Grenadier Guards provided the guard of honour and firing party. The banners of the branch of the local British Legion were carried in the cortège on its way to Brookwood Cemetery. The two buglers sounded the Last Post at the graveside. No relatives were able to attend the service as most of them lived in South Africa. The inscription on his gravestone as 'One who never turned his back but marches breast forward'.

== The Medal ==
His VC is displayed at the National Museum of Military History in Johannesburg, South Africa. "He is commemorated at St Anne's Cathedral, Belfast, and at Delville Wood, France. He is also remembered at the Royal Norfolk Regimental Museum in Norwich, and the National Portrait Gallery has two portraits of him".

== Books ==
- Bailey, Roderick (2010). Forgotten Voices of the Victoria Cross. London: Ebury Publishing. ISBN 9781409004806.
- Bujak, Philip (2008). Undefeated: The Extraordinary Life and Death of Lt. Col. Jack Sherwood Kelly, VC, CMG, DSO. Forster Consulting. ISBN 978-0-9551902-2-3.
- Bujak, Philip (2018). The Bravest Man in the British Army: The Extraordinary Life and Death of John Sherwood Kelly. Pen and Sword Books. ISBN 978-1473895768.
- Gliddon, Gerald, ed. (1998). Norfolk & Suffolk in the Great War. Gliddon Books. ISBN 0-947893-07-5.
- Gliddon, Gerald (2004) [2012]. VCs of the First World War: Cambrai 1917. The History Press. ISBN 978-0-75-247668-1.
- Harvey, David (1999). Monuments to Courage : Victoria Cross Headstones and Memorials. Vol.1, 1854–1916. Kevin & Kay Patience.
- Hodgkinson, Peter E. (2016). British Infantry Battalion Commanders in the First World War. London: Taylor & Francis. ISBN 9781317171904.
- Ironside, Edmund (1953). Archangel 1918-1919. London: Constable. ISBN 978-1-84734-732-9.
- Kinvig, Clifford (2006). Churchill's Crusade: The British Invasion of Russia, 1918-1920. Hambledon Continuum. ISBN 978-1-85285-477-5.
- Ramsey Ullman, James (1968). Anglo-Soviet Relations, 1917-1921, Volume 2 Britain and the Russian Civil War. Princeton University Press: Princeton. ISBN 9780691656069.
- Uys, Ian S. (1973). For Valour The History of Southern Africa's Victoria Cross Heroes. Chippenham: Picton Publishing. ISBN 9780620008228.
- Buzzell, Nora, ed. (1997). The Register of the Victoria Cross. Cheltenham, Gloucestershire: This England Alma House. ISBN 0-906324-27-0.
- Wright, Damien (2017). Churchill's Secret War With Lenin British and Commonwealth Military Intervention in the Russian Civil War, 1918–20. Warwick: Helion Limited. ISBN 9781913118112.
