= Royal Norfolk Regiment =

Infantry regiment of the British Army

Norfolk Regiment Royal Norfolk Regiment
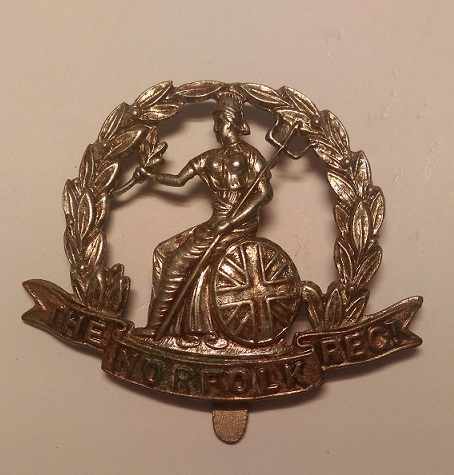
- Cap badge of the Royal Norfolk Regiment showing a seated Britannia
- Active: 1685–1959
- Country: United Kingdom
- Branch: British Army
- Type: Infantry
- Role: Line infantry
- Size: 2 Regular battalions 1–2 Militia and Special Reserve battalions Up to 4 Territorial and Volunteer battalions Up to 12 Hostilities-only battalions
- Garrison/HQ: Gorleston Barracks, Great Yarmouth (1881–1887); Britannia Barracks, Norwich (1887–1959)
- Nicknames: "The Holy Boys" "The Fighting Ninth" "The Norfolk Howards"
- Motto: Firm
- Facings: Yellow
- March: Rule Britannia
- Anniversaries: Almanza, 25 April
- Battle honours: see below

Insignia
- Shoulder titles: "Royal Norfolk"

The Royal Norfolk Regiment was a line infantry regiment of the British Army until 1959. Its predecessor regiment was raised in 1685 as Henry Cornwall's Regiment of Foot. In 1751, it was numbered like most other British Army regiments and named the 9th Regiment of Foot.

It was formed as the Norfolk Regiment in 1881 under the Childers Reforms of the British Army as the county regiment of Norfolk by merging the 9th (East Norfolk) Regiment of Foot with the local Militia and Rifle Volunteers battalions. (Note: The other regiment linked with Norfolk, the 54th Regiment of Foot, became part of the Dorsetshire Regiment)

The Norfolk Regiment fought in the First World War on the Western Front and in the Middle East. After the war, the regiment became the Royal Norfolk Regiment on 3 June 1935. The regiment fought with distinction in the Second World War, in action in the Battle of France and Belgium, the Far East, and then in the invasion of, and subsequent operations in, North-west Europe.

In 1959, as part of British Army reorganisation, the Royal Norfolk Regiment was amalgamated with the Suffolk Regiment, to become the 1st East Anglian Regiment (Royal Norfolk and Suffolk). In turn the regiment's battalion was amalgamated with the other regular battalions of the East Anglian Brigade (the 2nd East Anglian Regiment (Duchess of Gloucester's Own Royal Lincolnshire and Northamptonshire), the 3rd East Anglian Regiment (16th/44th Foot) and the Royal Leicestershire Regiment) to form the Royal Anglian Regiment, of which A Company of the 1st Battalion is known as the Royal Norfolks.

== History ==
=== Early history ===
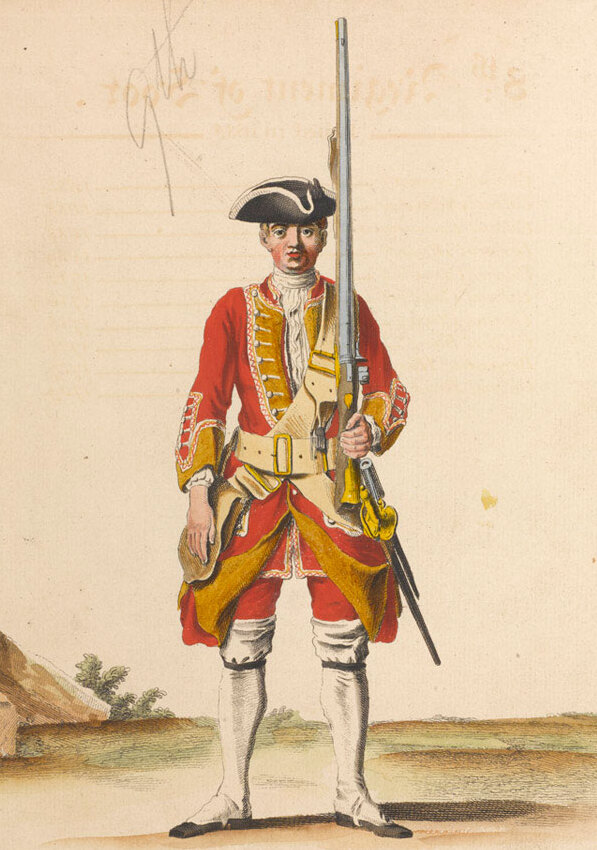
c. 1742 engraving of a regimental private

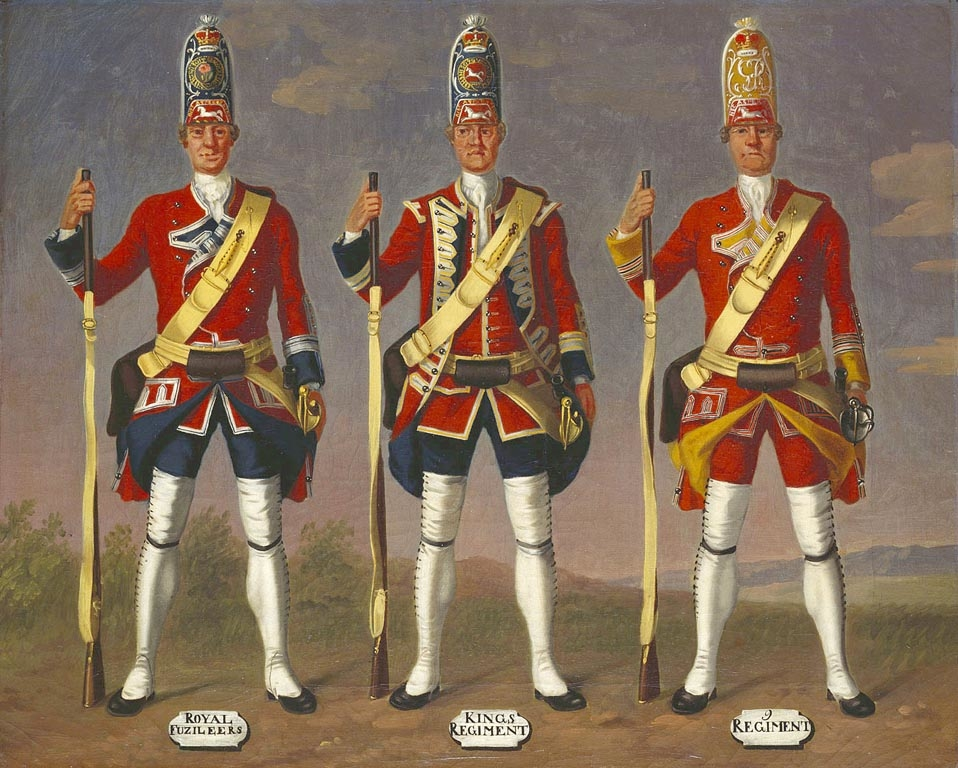
c. 1751 painting of a regimental grenadier (right)

The regiment was raised for the English Army in Gloucester by Colonel Henry Cornewall as Henry Cornewall's Regiment of Foot at the request of James II in 1685 as part of the response to the Monmouth Rebellion. Cornewall resigned his post following the Glorious Revolution and command went to Colonel Oliver Nicholas in November 1688. In December 1688, Nicholas was also removed due to his personal Jacobite sympathies and command passed to John Cunningham. In April 1689 the regiment, under Cunningham's command, embarked at Liverpool for Derry for service in the Williamite War in Ireland. Cunningham led a failed attempt to relieve the besieged city of Derry. The regiment briefly returned to England, but in May 1689 Cunningham was replaced by William Stewart, under whom the regiment took part in a successful relief of Derry in summer 1689. The regiment also saw action at the Battle of the Boyne in July 1690, the siege of Limerick in August 1690 and the siege of Athlone in June 1691. It went on to fight at the Battle of Aughrim in July 1691 and the siege of Limerick in August 1691.

In 1701, with war threatening, the English government, over the objections of General William Selwyn, posted an Independent Company of regular soldiers, detached from the 2nd Regiment of Foot, to Bermuda, where the militia continued to serve as a standby in case of war or insurrection. The company was composed of Captain Lancelot Sandys, Lieutenant Robert Henly, two sergeants, two corporals, fifty private soldiers, and a drummer, and arrived in Bermuda along with the new Governor, Captain Benjamin Bennett, aboard HMS Lincoln, in May 1701.

The regiment embarked for Holland in June 1701 and took part in the sieges of Kaiserswerth and of Venlo in spring 1702 during the War of the Spanish Succession. In March 1704, the regiment embarked for Lisbon, and later took part in the Battle of Almansa in April 1707 before returning to England in summer of 1708. The regiment was then based in Menorca from summer 1718 to 1746. The regiment was renamed the 9th Regiment of Foot in 1751 when all British regiments were given numbers for identification instead of using their Colonel's name. During the Seven Years' War the regiment won its first formal battle honour as part of the expedition that captured Belle Île from the French in 1761. It sailed for Cuba with George Keppel, 3rd Earl of Albemarle in March 1762 and took part in the siege and subsequent capture of Havana in summer 1762.

Following the signing of the Treaty of Paris in 1763 and the end of the war, the regiment was posted to St Augustine, Florida, where it remained until 1769. In April 1776, the regiment embarked for Canada as part of an expedition under Major-General John Burgoyne and took part in the siege of Fort Ticonderoga and the Battle of Fort Anne in July 1777 during the American Revolutionary War. It surrendered after the Battle of Saratoga in autumn 1777 and its men then spent three years as prisoners of war in Convention Army.

On 31 August 1782, the regiment was linked with Norfolk as part of attempts to improve recruitment to the army as a whole and it became the 9th (East Norfolk) Regiment of Foot. In January 1788, the regiment embarked for the West Indies and took part in the capture of the island of Tobago and in the attack on Martinique. It went on to capture Saint Lucia and Guadeloupe before returning to England in autumn 1796. In 1799 the King approved the Regiment's use of Britannia as its symbol. The next period of active service was the unsuccessful Anglo-Russian invasion of Holland under the Duke of York when the regiment took part in the Battle of Bergen in September 1799 and the Battle of Alkmaar in October 1799. It also took part in the Ferrol Expedition in August 1800 under Sir James Pulteney. In November 1805, shortly after the Battle of Trafalgar, the Regiment suffered a significant misfortune: as the 1st battalion sailed for the Hanover Expedition a storm wrecked the troop transport Ariadne on the northern French coast and some 262 men were taken prisoner. The Times reported that some 300 men had been captured, including 11 officers (two of them colonels). There were also 20 women and 12 children aboard. Crew and passengers were saved and conducted to Calais.

=== Napoleonic Wars ===
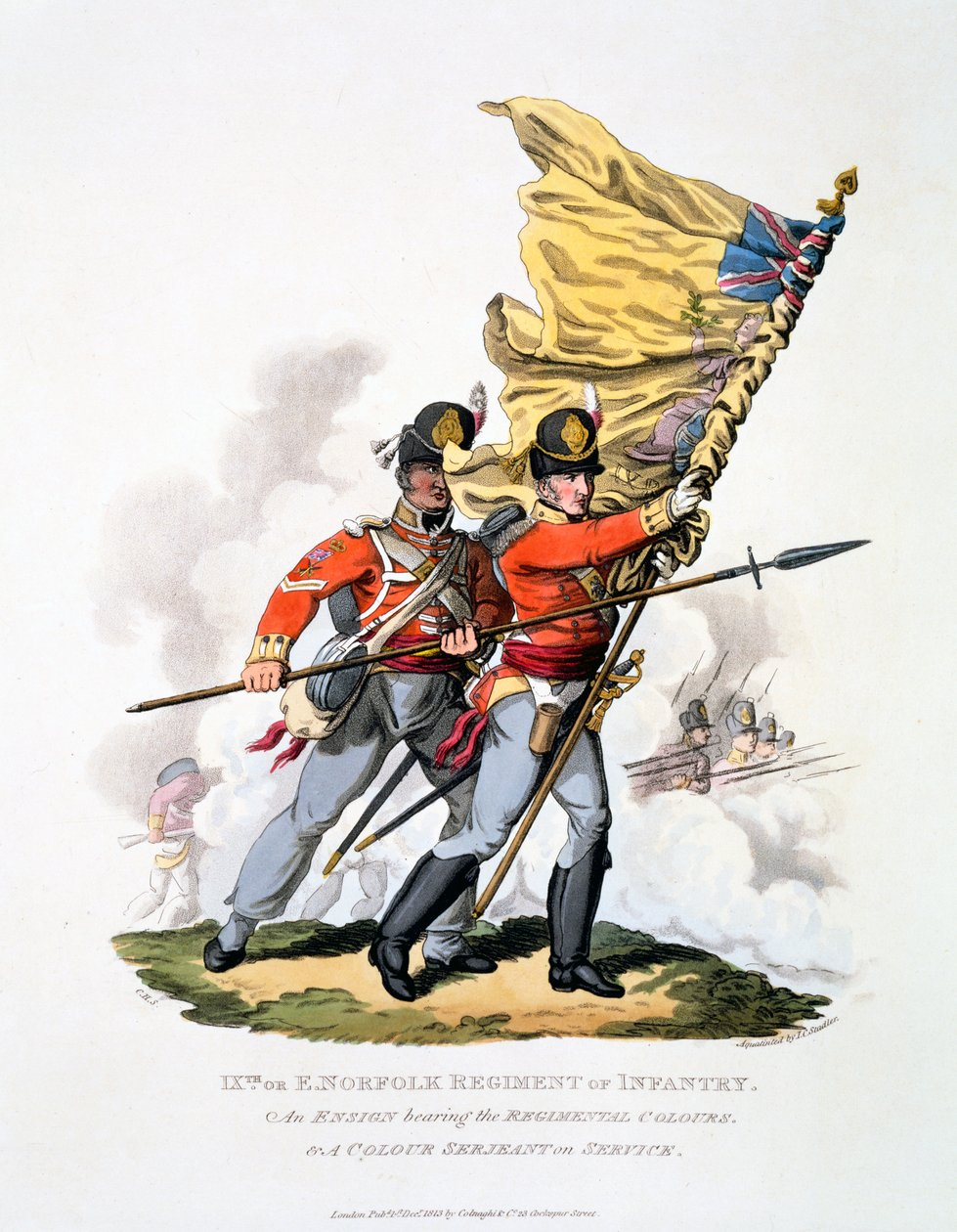
1813 engraving of a regimental colour sergeant and ensign

In June 1808, the regiment sailed to Portugal for service in the Peninsular War. It saw action at the Battle of Roliça and the Battle of Vimeiro in August 1808. Following the retreat from Corunna, the regiment buried Sir John Moore (commander of the British forces in the Iberian peninsula) and left Spanish soil. The regiment then took part in the disastrous Walcheren expedition to the Low Countries in summer 1809.

The regiment returned to the Peninsula in March 1810 and fought under Wellington at Battle of Bussaco, Portugal in September 1810, the Battle of Sabugal in April 1811 and the Battle of Fuentes de Oñoro in May 1811. It also saw action at the siege of Ciudad Rodrigo in January 1812, the siege of Badajoz in March 1812 and the Battle of Salamanca in July 1812. It saw further combat at the siege of Burgos in September 1812, the Battle of Vitoria in June 1813 and the siege of San Sebastián in September 1813. The regiment pursued the French Army into France and fought them at the Battle of Nivelle in November 1813 and the Battle of the Nive in December 1813.

The regiment was sent to Canada with most of Wellington's veteran units to prevent the threatened invasion by the United States, and so arrived in Europe too late for the Battle of Waterloo. The 1st Battalion participated in the Army of Occupation in France, whilst the 2nd Battalion was disbanded at the end of 1815.

=== The Victorian era ===
The regiment saw action at Kabul in August 1842 during the First Anglo-Afghan War and at the Battle of Mudki and the Battle of Ferozeshah in December 1845 and the Battle of Sobraon in February 1846 during the First Anglo-Sikh War. The Norfolk Artillery Militia was formed in 1853.

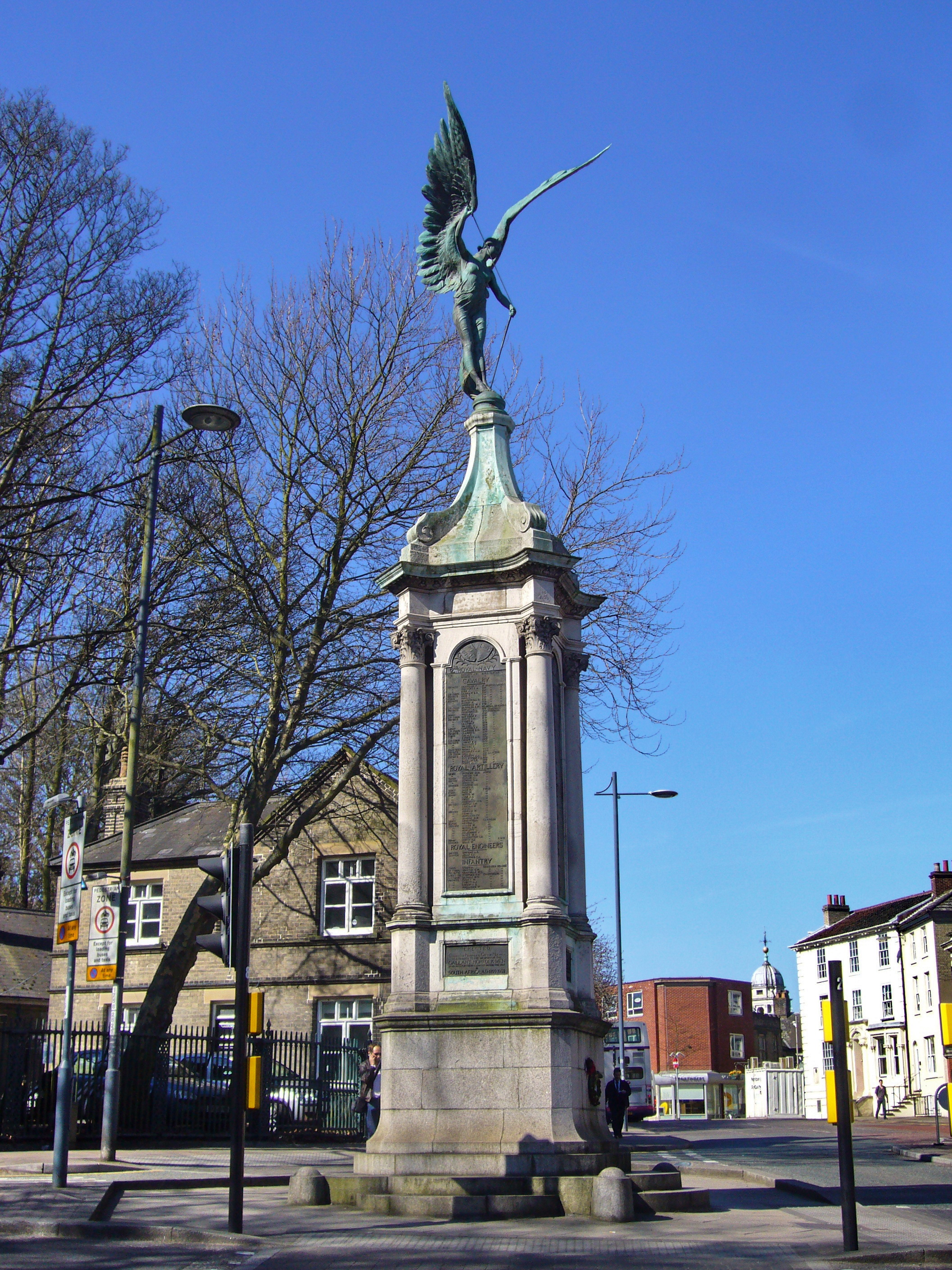
The Royal Norfolk Regiment's Boer War Memorial at the end of Castle Meadow in Norwich

The regiment fought in the Crimean War at the siege of Sevastopol in winter of 1854 In 1866 it landed at Yokohama, Japan as part of the British garrison stationed there in protection of British commercial and diplomatic interests in the recently opened treaty port. The regiment saw action at Kabul again in 1879 during the Second Anglo-Afghan War.

The regiment was not fundamentally affected by the Cardwell Reforms of the 1870s, which gave it a depot at Gorleston Barracks in Great Yarmouth from 1873, or by the Childers Reforms of 1881 – as it already possessed two battalions, there was no need for it to amalgamate with another regiment. Under the reforms the regiment became The Norfolk Regiment on 1 July 1881. It had two regular battalions (1st and 2nd) and two militia battalions (the 3rd and 4th - the latter formed from the East Norfolk Militia). It inherited all the battle honours and traditions of its predecessor regiment.

The 1st battalion was stationed in Gibraltar from 1887, then in British India.

In October 1899 war broke out between the United Kingdom and the Boer Republics in what is now South Africa. The 2nd Battalion embarked for service there in early January 1900, and was stationed in the Transvaal Colony. The war ended with the Treaty of Vereeniging in June 1902 and the Battalion stayed in South Africa until January 1903, when 417 officers and men left Cape Town for home. The 3rd (Militia) Battalion (the former 1st Norfolk Militia) was embodied in January 1900 for service during the Second Boer War. 540 officers and men left Queenstown in the SS Orotava the following month for Cape Town. As the Norfolk Regiment, it first saw action at the Battle of Poplar Grove in March 1900 during the Second Boer War.

In 1908, the Volunteers and Militia were reorganised nationally, with the former becoming the Territorial Force and the latter the Special Reserve; the regiment now had one Reserve and three Territorial battalions.

=== First World War ===
==== Regular Army ====
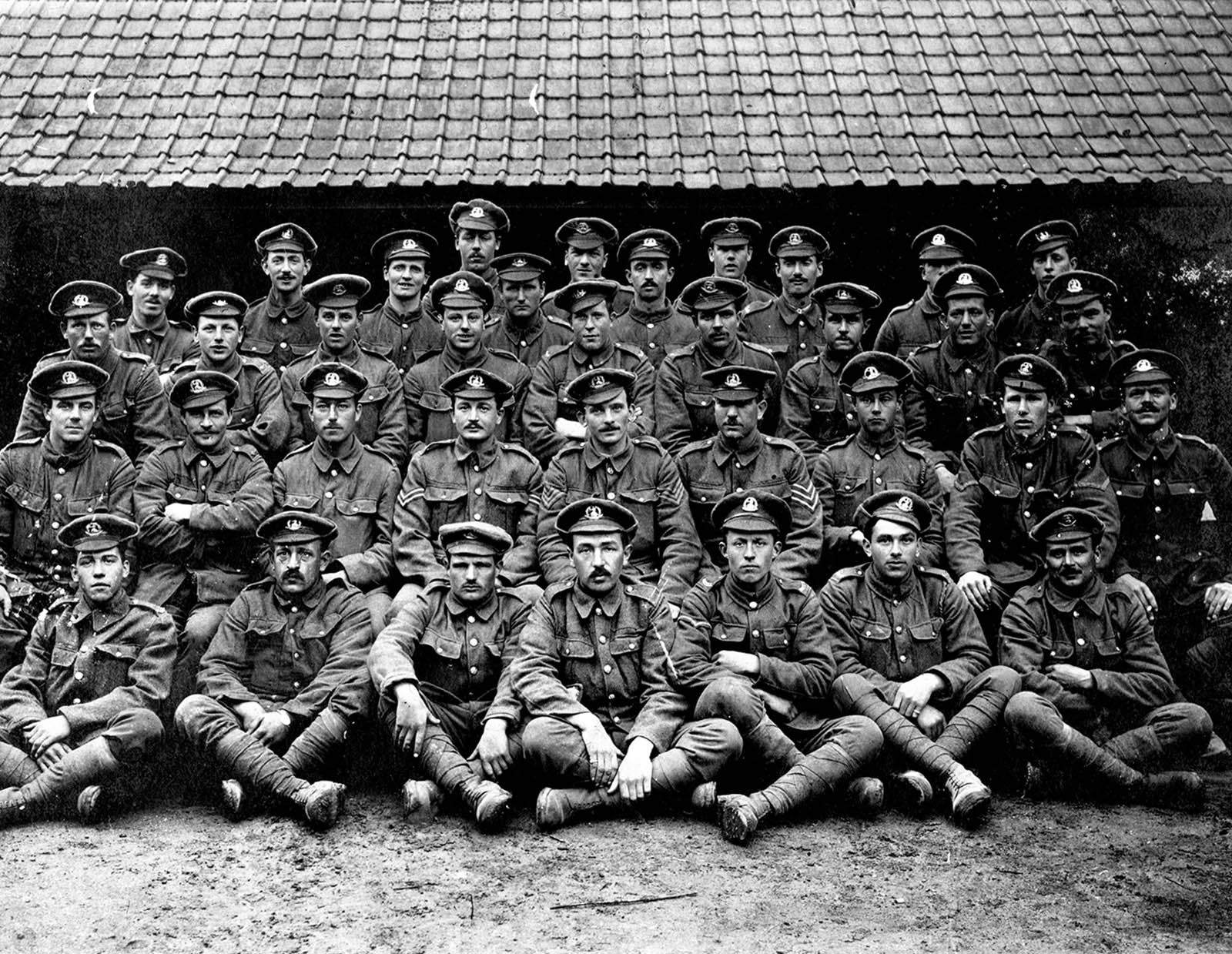
Tommies of the 1st Battalion, Norfolk Regiment in France, May 1916

The 1st Battalion was serving in Ireland upon the outbreak of the war and was given orders to mobilise on 4 August, the day that Britain declared war on Germany. Part of the 15th Infantry Brigade, 5th Division, the battalion left Belfast on 14 August and immediately embarked for France, where they became part of the British Expeditionary Force (BEF). They saw their first action of the war against the German Army at the Battle of Mons in August 1914.

The 2nd Battalion was serving in Bombay, India in the 18th (Belgaum) Brigade, part of the 6th (Poona) Division, of the British Indian Army, upon the outbreak of war. The 2nd Battalion of the Norfolks fought in the Mesopotamian campaign. The treatment of prisoners after the fall of Kut al Amara in April 1916 mirrors what later befell the Royal Norfolks in the Far East during the Second World War.

==== Territorial Force ====
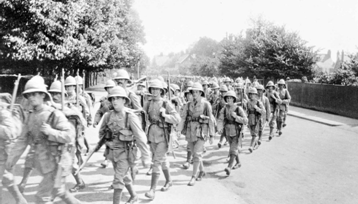
Men of the Sandringham Company, 1/5th Battalion, Norfolk Regiment, in tropical uniform, 1915

The two Territorial Force battalions, the 4th and 5th, were both part of the Norfolk and Suffolk Brigade, part of the East Anglian Division. In May 1915 these became the 163rd (Norfolk and Suffolk) Brigade, 54th (East Anglian) Division. The two territorial battalions both served in the Gallipoli campaign in mid-1915. The 1/5th included men recruited from the Royal estate at Sandringham.

On 12 August 1915, the 1/5th Battalion suffered heavy losses at Gallipoli when it became isolated during an attack. A myth grew up long after the War that the men had advanced into a mist and simply disappeared. A BBC TV drama, All the King's Men (1999), starring David Jason as Captain Frank Beck, was based upon their story.

In the Second Battle of Gaza in 1917, the 1/4th and 1/5th battalions suffered 75% casualties, about 1,100 men. The 1/6th (Cyclist) Battalion was in Norwich on the outbreak of war: however, the 1/6th never served overseas and remained instead in Norfolk throughout the war until 1918 when it was sent to Ireland.

The 2/4th and 2/5th battalions were both raised in September 1914 from the few men of the 4th and 5th battalions who did not volunteer for Imperial Service overseas when asked. Therefore, Territorial units were split into 1st Line units, which were liable to serve overseas, and 2nd Line units, which were intended to act as a reserve for the 1st Line serving overseas. To distinguish them, all battalions adopted the '1/' or '2/' prefix (1/4th Norfolks as a 1st Line unit, 2/4th Norfolks as a 2nd Line unit). The 2/4th and 2/5th were part of the 2nd Norfolk and Suffolk Brigade, 2nd East Anglian Division, later, in August 1915, they became 208th (2/1st Norfolk and Suffolk) Brigade, 69th (2nd East Anglian) Division. However, both battalions were disbanded in 1918: the 2/4th in June and the 2/5th in May. The 2/6th (Cyclist) Battalion, formed in October 1914 as a duplicate of the 1/6th (Cyclist) Battalion, had much the same history as the 1/6th Battalion and remained in the United Kingdom until May 1918 when it was disbanded.

The Norfolk Yeomanry (TF), having fought dismounted in the Gallipoli Campaign, were withdrawn to Egypt, where they were reorganised as infantry and redesignated as the 12th (Norfolk Yeomanry) Battalion, Norfolk Regiment, in the 74th (Yeomanry) Division (the 'Broken Spur' division). The battalion fought in the Palestine Campaign at the Third Battle of Gaza (the Battles of Beersheba and Nebi Samwi) in 1917, and distinguished itself at the Battle of Tell Azur in March 1918. The 74th Division was then sent to reinforce the BEF in France, where the 12th Norfolks were detached to the 31st Division, with which the battalion served during the final Hundred Days Offensive.

==== Service battalions ====
The 7th (Service) Battalion, Norfolk Regiment was raised in August 1914 from men volunteering for Kitchener's New Armies: it landed at Boulogne-sur-Mer as part of the 35th Infantry Brigade in the 12th (Eastern) Division in May 1915 for service on the Western Front.

The 8th (Service) Battalion landed at Boulogne as part of the 53rd Infantry Brigade of the 18th (Eastern) Division in July 1915 and was present on the first day of the Battle of the Somme on 1 July 1916.

The 9th (Service) Battalion landed at Boulogne as part of the 71st Infantry Brigade in the 24th Division in August 1915 for operations on the Western Front.

The 10th (Service) Battalion, raised in 1914, became the 10th (Reserve) Battalion in April 1915.

==== Victoria Cross ====
During the war, Lieutenant Colonel Jack Sherwood Kelly, a Norfolk Regiment officer, was awarded the Victoria Cross while leading a trench assault by Irish troops during the Battle of Cambrai in 1917.

=== Between the wars ===
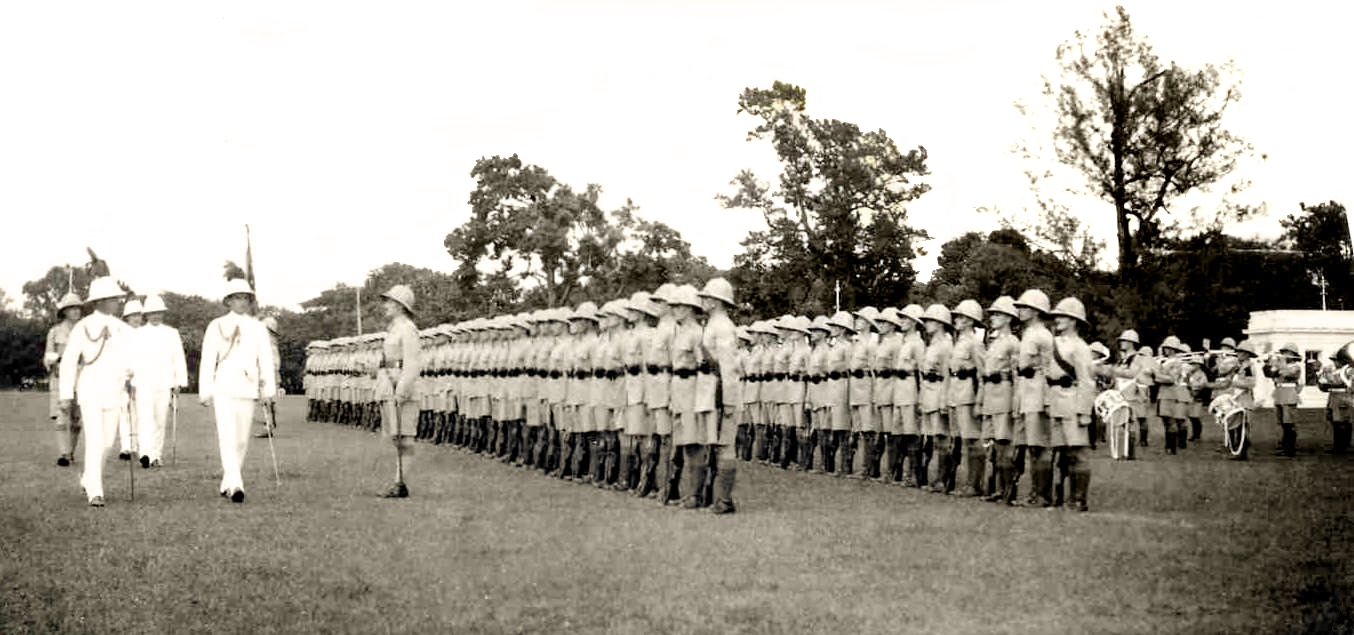
Men of the 1st Battalion, Norfolk Regiment, on parade being inspected by Sir John Anderson, the governor general of Bengal; Dacca, British India, 1933.

In June 1935 King George V celebrated his silver jubilee. This opportunity was taken of granting royal status to four regiments, principally in recognition of their service in the previous war:

On the occasion of His Majesty's Birthday and in commemoration of the completion of the twenty-fifth year of his reign, the King has been graciously pleased... to approve that the following regiments shall in future enjoy the distinction "Royal" and shall henceforth be designated:—

- 5th Royal Inniskilling Dragoon Guards
- The Buffs (Royal East Kent Regiment)
- The Royal Northumberland Fusiliers
- The Royal Norfolk Regiment

=== Second World War ===
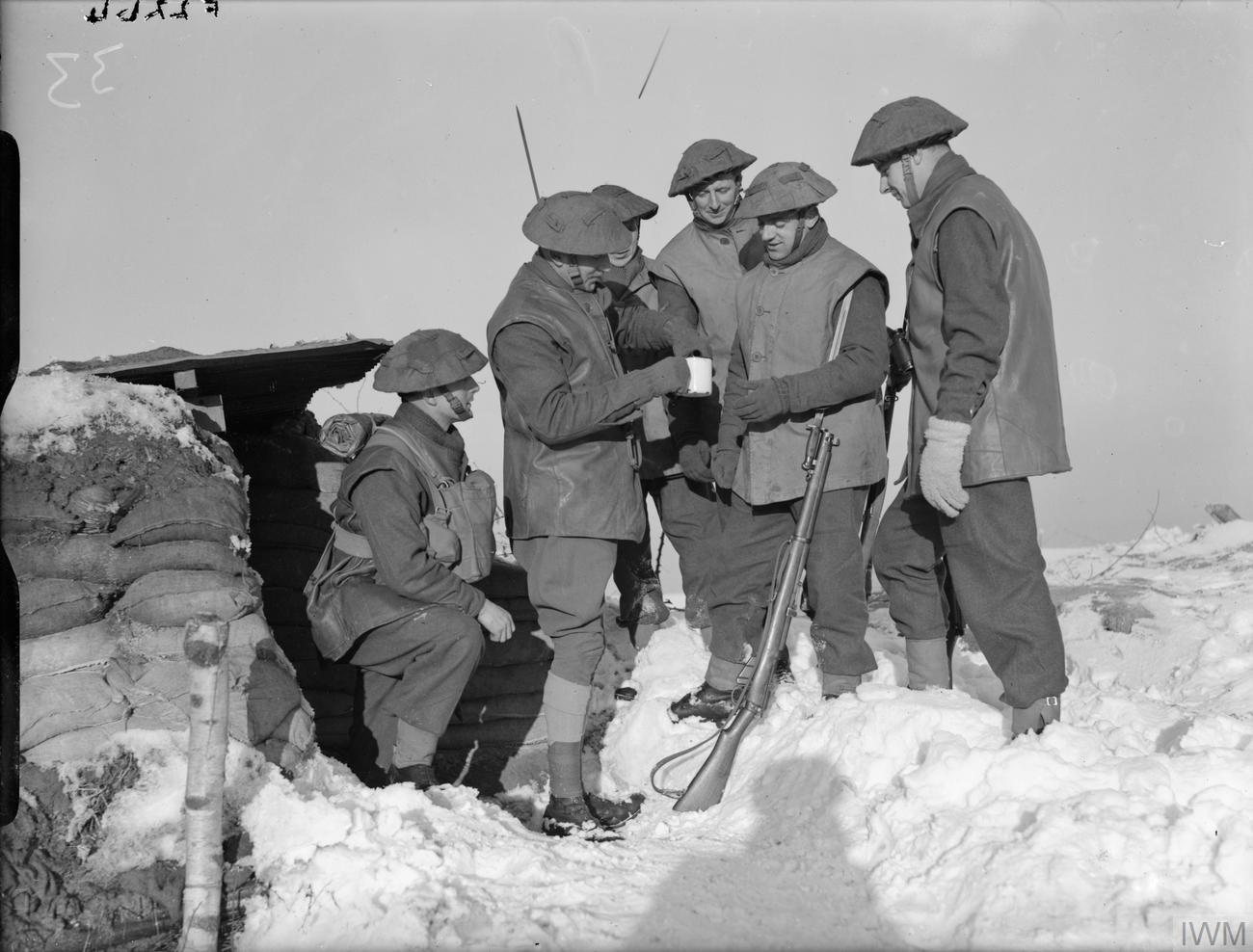
Men of the 2nd Battalion, Royal Norfolk Regiment receive their rum ration before going out on patrol in France, 26 January 1940.

In 1940, the first decorations for gallantry awarded to the British Expeditionary Force in France were gained by men of the 2nd Battalion. Captain Frank Peter Barclay, was awarded the Military Cross, and Lance-Corporal Davis the Military Medal. Captain F.P. Barclay would later lead the 1st Battalion in the North West Europe campaign towards the end of the war. Five members of the Royal Norfolks, the highest number of any British Army regiment during the Second World War, were awarded the Victoria Cross:

- David Auldjo Jamieson
- John Niel Randle
- George Gristock
- Sidney Bates
- George Arthur Knowland

==== Regular Army battalions ====
The 1st Battalion was a regular army unit that was stationed in India at the outbreak of war and was recalled to Britain, arriving in July 1940 during the Battle of Britain. They were part of the 185th Infantry Brigade originally assigned to the 79th Armoured Division but the brigade (including the 2nd Royal Warwickshire Regiment and 2nd King's Shropshire Light Infantry) transferred to the 3rd Infantry Division, with which it would remain with for the rest of the war. The battalion landed on Red Queen Beach, the left flank of Sword Beach, at 07:25 on 6 June 1944, D-Day. The 1st Battalion progressed up the beach and engaged the 736th Grenadier Regiment at the fortified position on Periers Ridge codenamed Hillman Fortress. In this attack the 1st Battalion suffered 150 casualties. The 1st Battalion continued to fight with distinction through the Normandy Campaign and throughout the North West Europe campaign. On 6 August 1944 near Viessoix, Sidney Bates of B Company was posthumously awarded the Victoria Cross for his great courage in the Battle of Sourdevallee against the 10th SS Panzer Division. Lieutenant General Miles Dempsey, the British Second Army commander, stated that by holding their ground in the battle the battalion made the subsequent breakthrough in August possible. By the end of the war in Europe, the 1st Battalion had gained a remarkable reputation and was claimed by Field Marshal Sir Bernard Montgomery, the 21st Army Group commander, as 'second to none' of all the battalions in the 21st Army Group. The 1st Royal Norfolks had suffered 20 officers and 260 other ranks killed with well over 1,000 wounded or missing in 11 months of almost continuous combat.

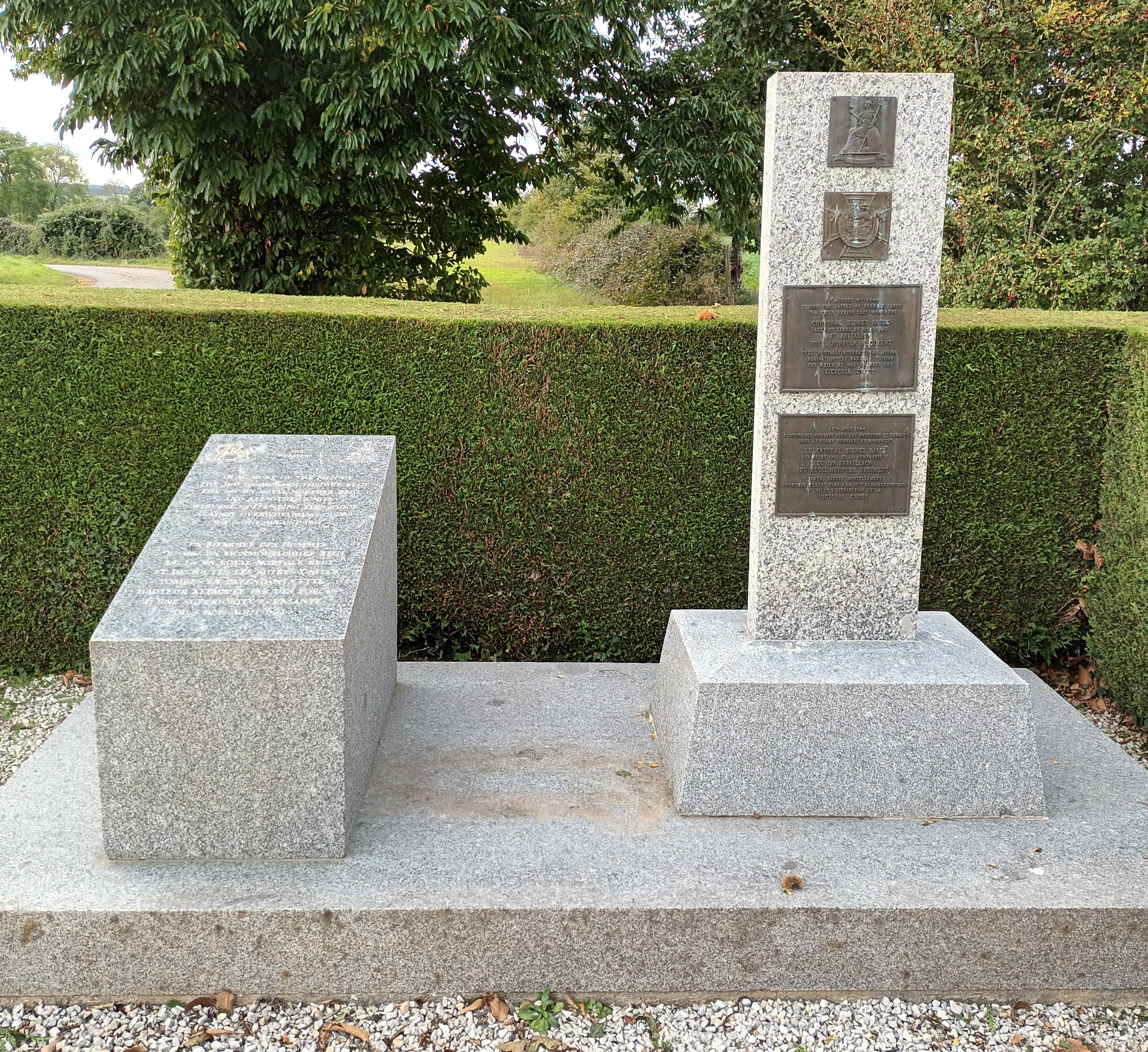
Memorial at Pavée in the commune of Viessoix

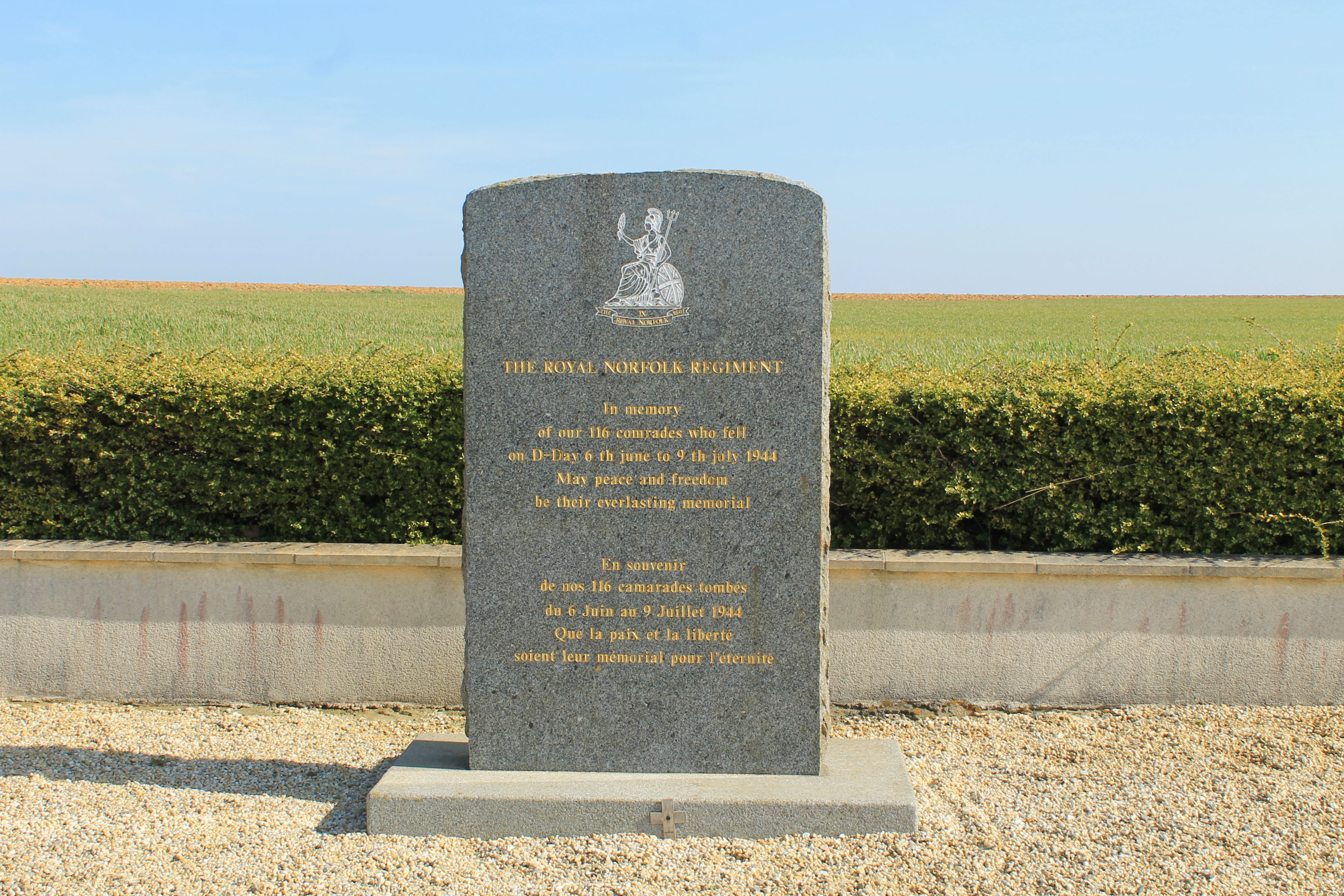
Monument at Biéville-Beuville, Normandy, in memory of 116 comrades who fell between D-Day 6 June and 9 July 1944

During the Battle of France in 1940, Company Sergeant-Major George Gristock of the 2nd Royal Norfolks was awarded the Victoria Cross. During the battle, members of the Royal Norfolks were victims of a German war crime at Le Paradis in the Pas-de-Calais on 26 May.

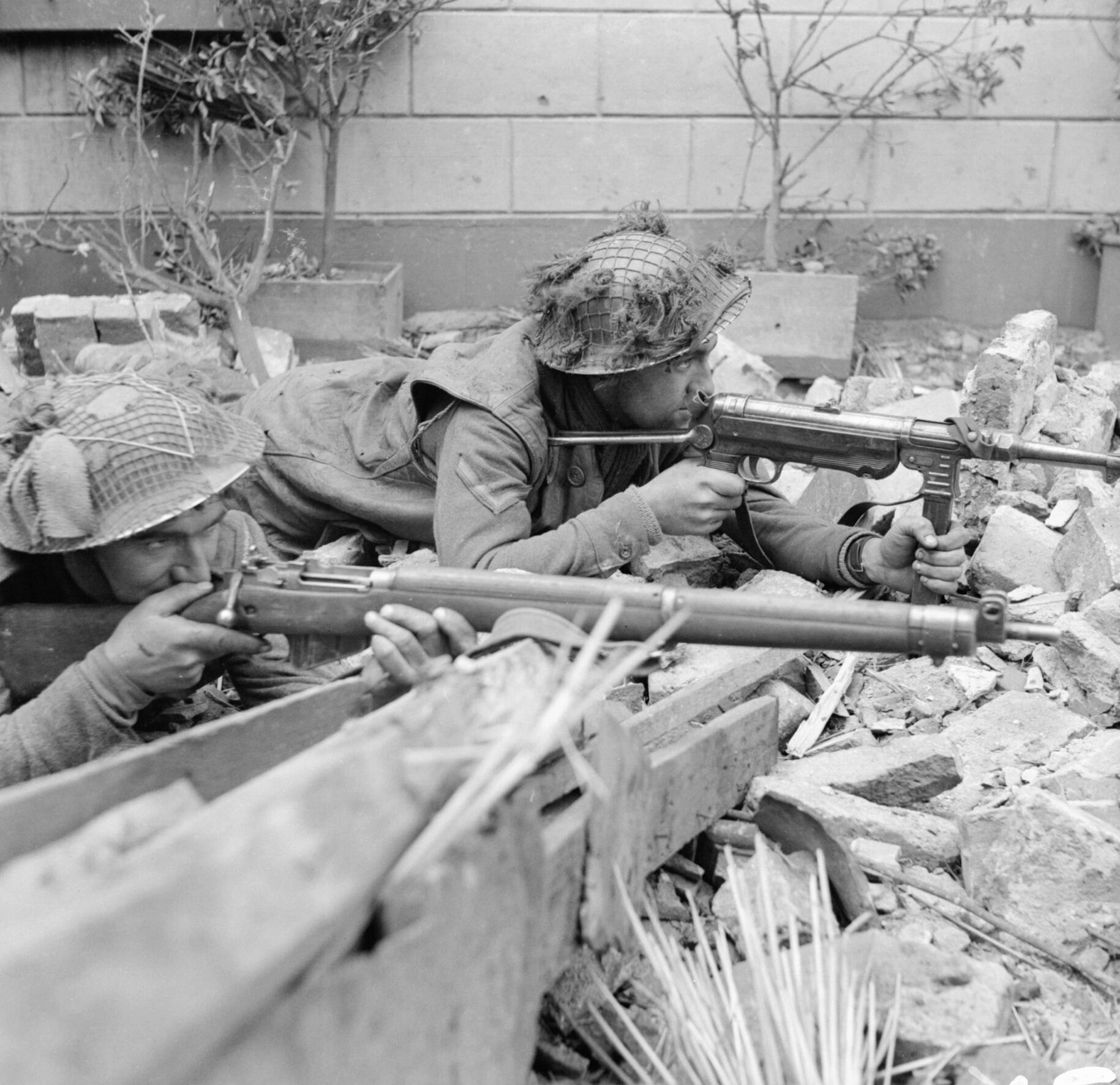
Lance Corporal R. Hearn and Private F. Slater (nearest camera) of the 1st Battalion, Royal Norfolk Regiment aim their weapons in the ruins of Kervenheim, 3 March 1945. Corporal Hearn is using a captured German MP 40 'Schmeisser' submachine gun.

The 2nd Battalion, Royal Norfolk Regiment, under the command of Lieutenant Colonel Eric Hayes, were attached to the 4th Infantry Brigade, part of the 2nd Infantry Division, which was holding the line of the La Bassée Canal and covering the retreat to Dunkirk. Units became separated from each other and HQ Company had formed a defensive position based at the Duriez farmhouse. They carried on their defence until the afternoon, by which point many were injured and the enemy were shelling the farm. Making a last stand in the open they were outnumbered and surrendered to a unit of the 2nd Infantry Regiment of the SS 'Totenkopf' (Death's Head) Division, under SS Obersturmfuhrer Fritz Knöchlein. The 99 prisoners were marched to some farm buildings on another farm where they were lined up alongside a barn wall. They were then fired upon by two machine guns; 97 were killed and the bodies buried in a shallow pit. Privates Albert Pooley and William O'Callaghan had hidden in a pigsty and were discovered later by the farm's owner, Mme Creton, and her son. The two soldiers were later captured by a Wehrmacht unit and spent the rest of the war as prisoners of war.

The bodies of the murdered soldiers were exhumed in 1942 by the French and reburied in the local churchyard which now forms part of the Le Paradis War Cemetery. A memorial plaque was placed on the barn wall in 1970. The massacre was investigated by the War Crimes Investigation Unit and Knöchlein was traced and arrested. Tried in a court in Hamburg, he was found guilty and hanged on 28 January 1949.

The 2nd Battalion, still as part of the 4th Infantry Brigade of the 2nd Infantry Division, also served in the Far East in the Burma campaign participating in battles such as the Battle of Kohima until the end of the war against Japan in 1945. They served with the British Fourteenth Army, known as the 'Forgotten Army' as their actions were generally overlooked and the main focus was in the North West Europe campaign. The Fourteenth Army was commanded by the popular and highly respected William Slim, 1st Viscount Slim. Both John Niel Randle and George Arthur Knowland were posthumously awarded the Victoria Cross whilst serving with the 2nd Battalion in the Far East, both for extraordinary heroism.

==== Territorial Army battalions ====
The 4th, 5th and 6th battalions, all part of the Territorial Army, served in the Far East. The 5th and 6th (City of Norwich) were both assigned to the 53rd Infantry Brigade, and the 4th Battalion the 54th Infantry Brigade. Both brigades were part of the 18th Infantry Division. Throughout most of their existence, all three battalions remained in the United Kingdom assigned to coastal defence duties and training to repel a German invasion and, in October 1941, the division left, destined for the Middle East. The 18th Division fought in the defence of Singapore and Malaya against the Japanese advance. The men of these battalions, and other East Anglian battalions of other regiments, ended up as prisoners of war when Singapore fell in February 1942. They would remain so until August 1945, during which time they were used as forced labour on projects such as the Death Railway through Burma.

The 7th Battalion, Royal Norfolk Regiment was formed in May 1939 as a 2nd Line Territorial Army duplicate of the 5th Battalion and, therefore, contained many former members of the 5th. Together with the 5th and 6th battalions, the 7th was assigned to the 53rd Infantry Brigade, part of the 18th Infantry Division until November when it assigned to pioneer duties in France with the British Expeditionary Force (BEF). In May 1940, it was assigned to the 51st (Highland) Infantry Division. The 51st Division was stationed on the Maginot Line and therefore escaped encirclement with the rest of the BEF during the Battle of France where they spent some time attached to the French 10th Army. The 7th Royal Norfolks suffered heavy casualties when the 51st (Highland) Infantry Division was surrounded and had no choice but to surrender, on 12 June 1940, with only 31 members of the battalion managing to return to Britain. In October 1940 the battalion was assigned to 205th Independent Infantry Brigade (Home), then the 220th Independent Infantry Brigade (Home). On 14 October 1942, the battalion was transferred to the 176th Infantry Brigade, alongside the 7th Battalion, South Staffordshire Regiment and 6th Battalion, North Staffordshire Regiment, of the 59th (Staffordshire) Infantry Division. The 59th Division was one of the follow-up units after D-Day in June 1944 and was considered by General Sir Bernard Montgomery as one of his best divisions. On the night of 7/8 August 1944, Captain David Auldjo Jamieson of D Company was awarded the Victoria Cross for his heroic leadership which greatly helped to fend off several enemy counter-attacks in a 36-hour period. Due to an acute shortage of infantrymen in the British Army at the time, the battalion, commanded by Lieutenant Colonel Ian Freeland, and division were disbanded in late August 1944 and its men used as replacements for other British divisions in the 21st Army Group who had also suffered heavy casualties in Normandy.

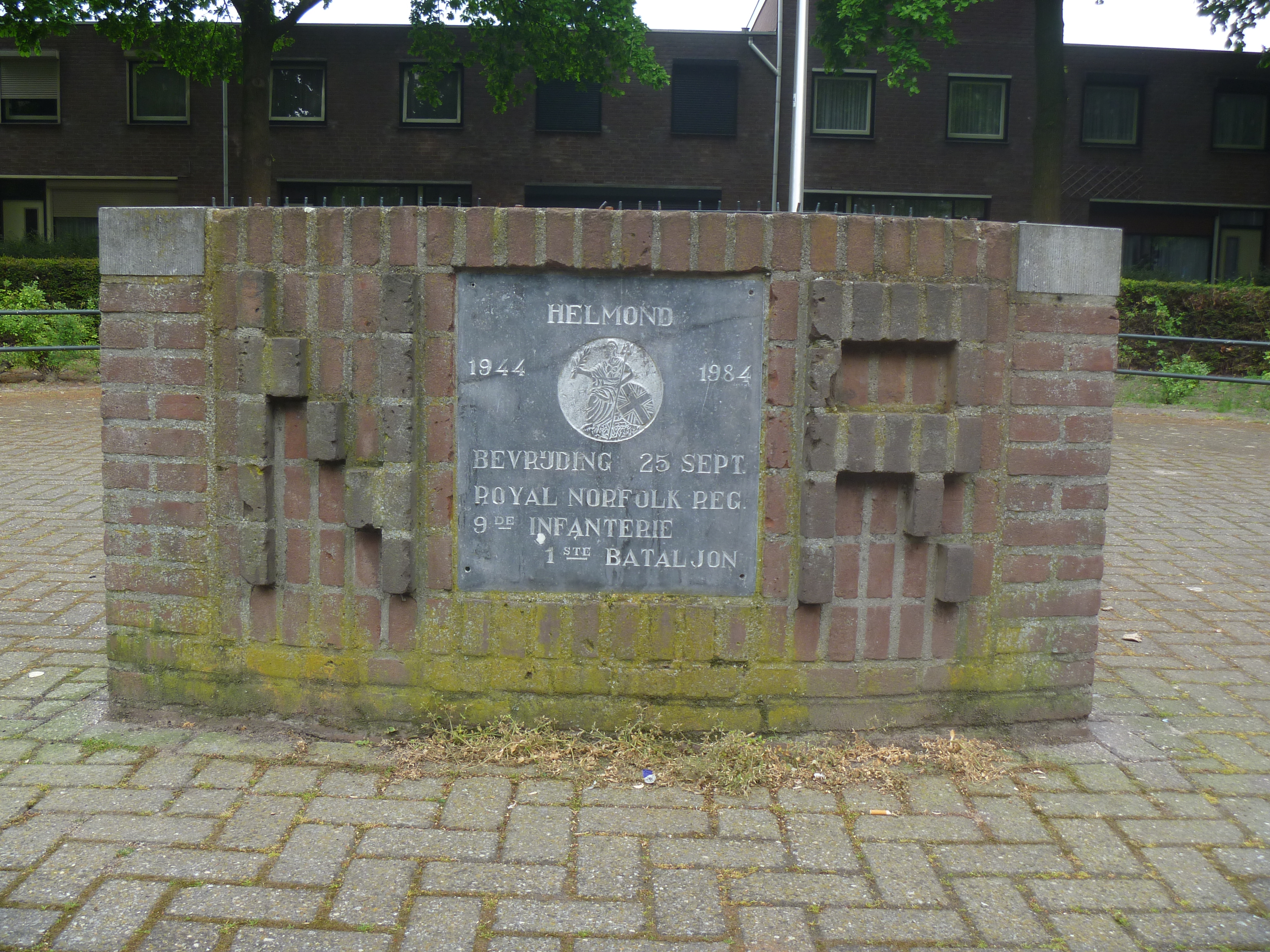
Monument on Royal Norfolkplein, Helmond, Netherlands, recording the liberation of the town on 25 September 1944 by the 1st Battalion, Royal Norfolk Regiment

==== Hostilities-only battalions ====
The 8th Battalion was raised in 1939 alongside the 9th Battalion with many veterans of the First World War. Both battalions were used mainly to supply reinforcements to those battalions of the regiment that were overseas. Neither of these battalions saw service overseas and remained in the United Kingdom throughout the war as part of the Home Forces with the 9th Battalion apparently being disbanded in August 1944 when its parent unit (25th Brigade attached to 47th (Reserve) Infantry Division) was disbanded.

The 8th Battalion was renumbered as the 30th Battalion and used for garrison duties in Italy during which the 43rd Infantry Brigade, which included 30th Battalion, Somerset Light Infantry and 30th Battalion, Dorset Regiment, was made to appear as a full division for deception purposes. The battalion remained in Italy until it was disbanded in 1946.

The 50th (Holding) Battalion was raised in late May 1940. The role of the Holding battalion was to temporarily 'hold' men who were homeless, medically unfit, awaiting orders, on a course or returning from abroad. The battalion was renumbered as the 9th Battalion in October and was assigned to the 220th Independent Infantry Brigade (Home), part of Norfolk County Division in early 1941.

The 70th (Young Soldiers) Battalion was raised in late 1940 for those young soldiers, mostly around the ages of 18 or 19, who had volunteered for the Army and therefore had not reached the compulsory age for conscription. The battalion spent most of its time in the UK guarding against a German invasion. However, the battalion was disbanded in 1943 due to the British government lowering the age of conscription to the British Armed Forces to 18 earlier in the year. This decision was due to a growing shortage of manpower, especially in the British Army and in the infantry in particular and the young soldiers of the disbanded 70th were sent to other battalions of the regiment serving overseas.

=== Post Second World War ===
The regiment served in Korea in 1951–52 during the Korean War, and in Cyprus in the fight against EOKA in 1955–56. In 1959 the Royal Norfolk Regiment was amalgamated as part of the reorganisation of the British Army resulting from the 1957 Defence White Paper becoming part of a new formation, the 1st East Anglian Regiment, part of the East Anglian Brigade.

== Regimental museum ==
The history of the Royal Norfolk Regiment and its predecessors and successors is recorded at the Royal Norfolk Regimental Museum. The museum moved from the Britannia Barracks, now part of Norwich prison, to the Shirehall and then to the Norwich Castle Museum. Although archives and the reserve collections are still held in the Shirehall, the principal museum display there closed in September 2011, and relocated to the main Norwich Castle Museum, reopening fully in 2013. Its exhibits illustrate the history of the Regiment from its 17th-century origins to its incorporation into the Royal Anglian Regiment in 1964, along with many aspects of military life in the Regiment. There is an extensive and representative display of medals awarded to soldiers of the Regiment, including two of the six Victoria Crosses won.

== Regimental chapel ==
St Saviour's Chapel in Norwich Cathedral is the chapel of the Royal Norfolk and Royal Anglian Regiments. Among other monuments it contains memorial stones to the 9th Foot/Royal Norfolk Regiment and to the 1st Bn Royal Norfolk Regiment in the Korean War.

== Uniform and insignia ==
The dress worn by the Regiment's predecessor units in the late 17th and early 18th centuries included orange and subsequently green facings. In 1733, official permission was given to change from bright green back to light orange facings. By 1747, this unusual shade had evolved into yellow, which was retained until 1881 when, in common with all English and Welsh regiments, the newly renamed Norfolk Regiment was given white distinctions on its scarlet tunics. In 1905, the traditional yellow facings were restored for full dress and mess uniforms. Another distinction of the Norfolk Regiment was the inclusion of a black line in the gold braid of officers' uniforms from 1881 onwards. When the regiment was redesignated as the "Royal Norfolk Regiment" in 1935, it was specially permitted to retain the yellow facings instead of changing to blue.

The figure of Britannia was officially recognised in 1799 as part of the insignia of the 9th Regiment of Foot. Regimental tradition claimed that it was granted to the regiment by Queen Anne in 1707 in recognition of its service at the Battle of Almanza. However, there is no evidence that it was used before the 1770s, and it was not listed as an authorised device in the royal warrants of 1747, 1751 or 1768. It subsequently became a central part of the badge of the Norfolk Regiment.

== Traditions ==
The Royal Norfolk Regiment held an anniversary on 25 April for the Battle of Almansa, which they inherited along with the regimental nickname of the "Holy Boys" from the 9th Regiment of Foot. They gained the "Holy Boys" nickname during the Peninsular War from the misidentification by a Spanish soldier of Britannia on their cap badge as the Virgin Mary.

== Battle honours ==
The following were the regiment's battle honours:

- Earlier years
  - Belleisle, Havannah, Martinque 1794, Roliça, Vimiera, Corunna, Busaco, Salamanca Vitoria, San Sebastián , Nive, Peninsula, Cabool 1842, Moodkee, Ferozeshah, Sobraon, Sevastopol, Kabul 1879, Afghanistan 1879–80, Paardeberg, South Africa (1900–02)
- First World War: (The regiment were permitted to display ten representative honours on the colours: these are indicated in **bold** text.)
  - **Mons**, **Le Cateau**, Retreat from Mons, **Marne 1914**, Aisne 1914, La Bassée 1914, **Ypres 1914** '15 '17 '18, Gravenstafel, St Julien, Frezenberg, Bellewaarde, Loos, **Somme 1916** '18, Albert 1916 '18, Delville Wood, Pozières, Guillemont, Flers-Courcelette, Morval, Thiepval, Le Transloy, Ancre Heights, Ancre 1916 '18, Arras 1917, Vimy 1917, Scarpe 1917, Arleux, Oppy, Pilckem, Langemarck 1917, Polygon Wood, Broodseinde, Poelcappelle, Passchendaele, Cambrai 1917 '18, St Quentin, Bapaume 1918, Lys, Bailleul, Kemmel, Scherpenberg, Amiens, **Hindenburg Line**, Épéhy, Canal du Nord, St Quentin Canal, Beaurevoir, Selle, Sambre, France and Flanders 1914–18, Italy 1917–18, Suvla, **Landing at Suvla**, Scimitar Hill, Gallipoli 1915, Egypt 1915–17,**Gaza**, El Mughar, Nebi Samwil, Jerusalem, Jaffa, Tell 'Asur, Megiddo, Sharon, Palestine 1917–18, **Shaiba**, **Kut al Amara 1915** '17, Ctesiphon, Defence of Kut al Amara, Mesopotamia 1914–18
- Second World War:
  - St Omer-La Bassée, North-West Europe 1940, Normandy Landing, Brieux Bridgehead, Venray, Rhineland, North-West Europe 1944–45, Singapore Island, Kohima, Aradura (1944–1945), Burma 1944–45
- Later wars:
  - Korea 1951–52

== Victoria Cross ==
In total, six members of the Norfolk or Royal Norfolk Regiment were awarded the Victoria Cross:

- Acting Lieutenant-Colonel John Sherwood-Kelly – at Battle of Cambrai while commanding Inniskilling Fusiliers
- Company Sergeant Major George Gristock – in Belgium during the Battle of France, subsequently dying of wounds sustained
- Captain John Niel Randle – in Far East, 1944
- Corporal Sidney Bates – 1st Bn, France 1944
- Captain David Jamieson – France at the Brieux bridgehead, 1944
- Lieutenant George Arthur Knowland – attached No. 1 Commando, Burma 1945

== Colonels of the Regiment ==
Colonels of the regiment were:

- 1685–1688: Col. Henry Cornewall
- 1688: Col. Oliver Nicholas
- 1688–1689: Col. John Cunningham
- 1689–1715: Gen. William Steuart
- 1715–1717: Lt-Gen. Hon. Sir James Campbell of Lawars, KB
- 1717–1718: Maj-Gen. Charles Cathcart, 8th Lord Cathcart
- 1718–1725: Col. James Otway
- 1725–1737: Brig-Gen. Richard Kane
- 1737–1739: Lt-Gen. William Hargrave
- 1739–1749: George Reade
- 1749–1751: Maj-Gen. Sir Charles Armand Powlett, KB

9th Regiment of Foot

- 1751–1755: Gen. John Waldegrave, 3rd Earl Waldegrave
- 1755–1758: Gen. Sir Joseph Yorke, 1st Baron Dover, KB
- 1758–1771: Lt-Gen. William Whitmore
- 1771–1782: Lt-Gen. Edward Ligonier, 1st Earl Ligonier, KB

9th (East Norfolk) Regiment

- 1782–1788: Maj-Gen. Thomas Twisleton, 13th Baron Saye and Sele
- 1788–1794: Lt-Gen. Hon. Alexander Leslie
- 1794–1804: Gen. Albemarle Bertie, 9th Earl of Lindsey
- 1804–1805: Lt-Gen. Peter Hunter
- 1805–1833: Gen. Sir Robert Brownrigg
- 1833–1844: Lt-Gen. Sir John Cameron
- 1844–1848: Lt-Gen. Sir Thomas Arbuthnot
- 1848–1871: Gen. Sir James Archibald Hope, GCB
- 1871–1881: Gen. Sir Henry Bates, KCB

The Norfolk Regiment

- 1881–1889: Gen. Sir Henry Bates, KCB
- 1889–1893: Gen. Sir Arthur Borton, GCB, GCMG
- 1893: Gen. Charles Elmhirst, CB
- 1893–1898: Gen. Thomas Edmond Knox, CB
- 1898–1903: Lt-Gen. Henry Buchanan, CB
- 1903–1917: Gen. Henry Ralph Browne, CB
- 1917–1946: Gen. Sir Peter Strickland, KCB, KBE, CMG, DSO

The Royal Norfolk Regiment

- 1946–1947: Maj-Gen. Horatio Berney-Ficklin, CB, MC
- 1947–1951: Brig. William John O'Brien Daunt, CBE
- 1951: Maj-Gen. Eric Hayes, CB
- 1951–1959: Brig. Claude John Wilkinson, DSO

== See also ==
- List of British Army regiments (1881)
- 54th (West Norfolk) Regiment of Foot (1782–1881)
- Norfolk Yeomanry
- West Runton War Memorial
- Sheringham War Memorial

== Sources ==
- Becke, Archibald F. (1936). Order of Battle of Divisions Part 2A. The Territorial Force Mounted Divisions and the 1st-Line Territorial Force Divisions (42–56). London: HMSO. OCLC 4405016.
- Becke, Archibald F. (1937). Order of Battle of Divisions Part 2B. The 2nd-Line Territorial Force Divisions (57th–69th) with The Home-Service Divisions (71st–73rd) and 74th and 75th Divisions. London: HMSO. OCLC 4405016.
- Becke, Archibald F. (1945). Order of Battle of Divisions Part 3B. New Army Divisions (30-41) & 63rd (R.N.) Division. London: HMSO. OCLC 4405016.
- Beckett, Ian (2003). Discovering English County Regiments. Shire. ISBN 978-0747-805069.
- Cannon, Richard (1848). Historical Record of the Ninth, or the East Norfolk, Regiment of Foot. London: Parker, Furnivall and Parker. ISBN 9780665454189.
- Joslen, Lt-Col H.F. (1960). Orders of Battle, United Kingdom and Colonial Formations and Units in the Second World War, 1939–1945. London: HM Stationery Office. ISBN 1-843424-74-6.
- Patrick Mileham, The Yeomanry Regiments: 200 Years of Tradition, 2nd Edn, Edinburgh: Canongate Academic, 1994, ISBN 1-898410-36-4.
- Maj C.H. Dudley Ward, The 74th (Yeomanry) Division in Syria and France, London: John Murray, 1922/Uckfield: Naval & Military Press, 2004, ISBN 1-843428-71-7.
