= Blainville-sur-Orne =

- Commune
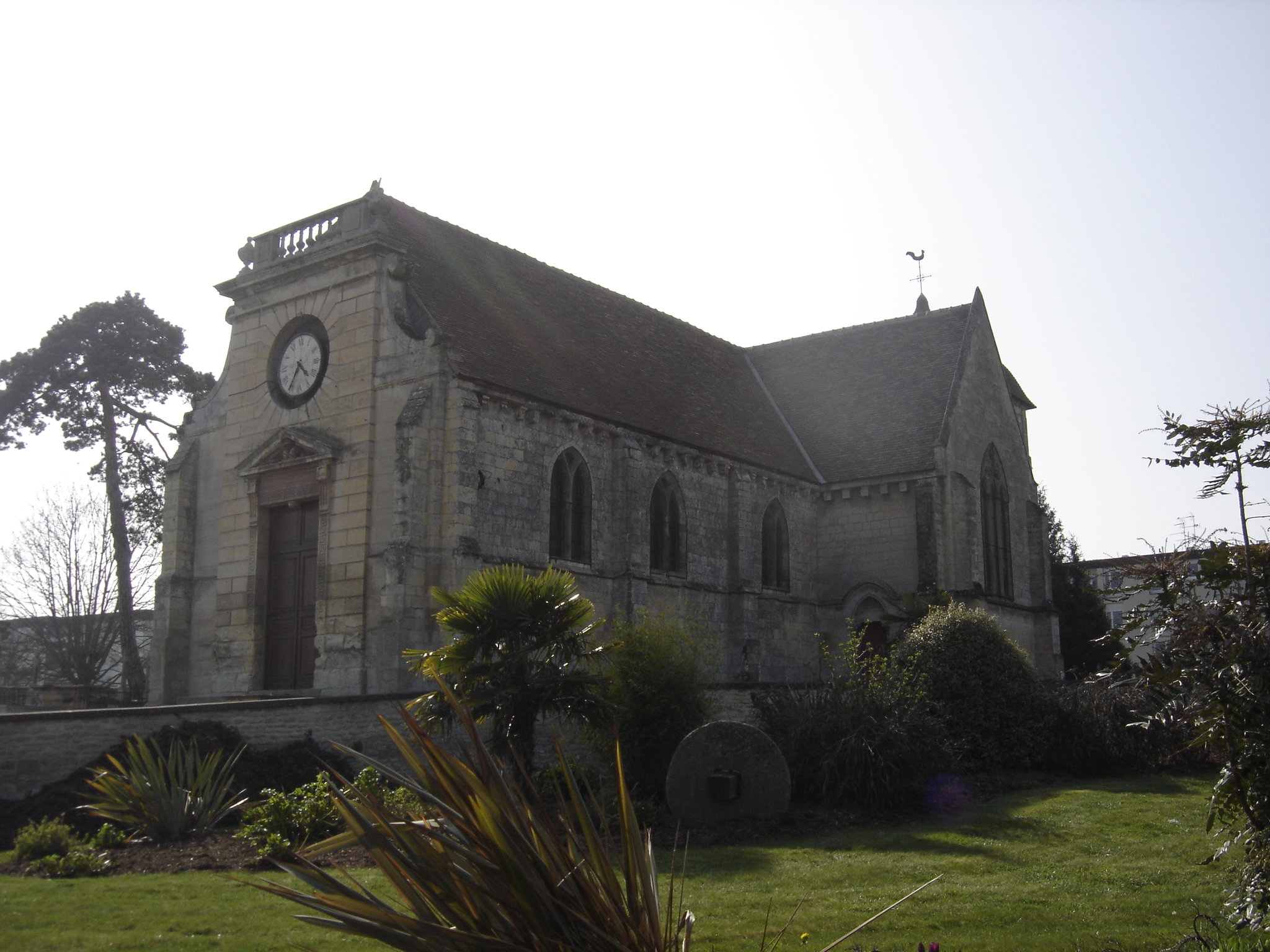
- The church in Blainville-sur-Orne

- Coat of arms
- Location of Blainville-sur-Orne
- Location within France Location within Normandy
- Coordinates: 49°13′47″N 0°17′56″W
- Country: France
- Region: Normandy
- Department: Calvados
- Arrondissement: Caen
- Canton: Ouistreham
- Intercommunality: Caen la Mer

Government
  - Mayor (2020–2026): Lionel Marie
- Area^{1}: 7.11 km^{2} (2.75 sq mi)
- Elevation: 25 m (82 ft)
- Highest elevation: 36 m (118 ft)
- Lowest elevation: 0 m (0 ft)
- Population (2023): 6,106
  - Density: 859/km^{2} (2,220/sq mi)
- Time zone: UTC+01:00 (CET)
  - Summer (DST): UTC+02:00 (CEST)
- INSEE/Postal code: 14076 /14550
- ^{1} French Land Register data, which excludes lakes, ponds, glaciers > 1 km^{2} (0.386 sq mi or 247 acres) and river estuaries.

Blainville-sur-Orne (French pronunciation: [blɛ̃vil syʁ ɔʁn], literally Blainville on Orne) is a commune in the Calvados department in the Normandy region in northwestern France.

== Geography ==
Blainville-sur-Orne is on the west side of the Canal de Caen à la Mer, just south of Bénouville and the famous Pegasus Bridge of D-Day fame. The town is also home to a Renault Trucks (formerly Saviem) manufacturing plant. The plant is across the canal to the southeast, between the canal and the river Orne. Just across the river from the plant is the commune of Colombelles. Directly across the canal from Blainville-sur-Orne is the fourth commercial French port for the importation of exotic wood, generally coming from the Gulf of Guinea. The port also exports cereals that are produced in the area and has a silo capacity of 33,000 tons. It lies 7 km (4.3 mi) north of Caen and 7 km (4.3 mi) south of the English Channel.

== Population ==
Historical population

Year	Pop.	±% p.a.
1793	210	—
1800	299	+5.18%
1806	325	+1.40%
1821	382	+1.08%
1831	351	−0.84%
1836	359	+0.45%
1841	353	−0.34%
1846	389	+1.96%
1851	357	−1.70%
1856	362	+0.28%
1861	381	+1.03%
1866	388	+0.36%
1872	351	−1.66%
1876	350	−0.07%
1881	307	−2.59%
1886	297	−0.66%
1891	282	−1.03%
1896	245	−2.77%
1901	235	−0.83%

Year	Pop.	±% p.a.
1906	239	+0.34%
1911	231	−0.68%
1921	960	+15.31%
1926	1,189	+4.37%
1931	1,206	+0.28%
1936	579	−13.65%
1946	1,573	+10.51%
1954	2,079	+3.55%
1962	2,119	+0.24%
1968	2,735	+4.34%
1975	2,519	−1.17%
1982	4,390	+8.26%
1990	4,341	−0.14%
1999	4,390	+0.12%
2007	5,541	+2.95%
2012	5,538	−0.01%
2017	5,801	+0.93%
2023	6,106	+0.86%

Source: EHESS and INSEE (1968-2023)

== Twin towns ==
Blainville-sur-Orne is twinned with:

- Bomlitz, Germany, since 2004
- Sartirana Lomellina, Italy, since 2007

== See also ==
- Blainville, Quebec - a suburb of Montreal
- Communes of the Calvados department
