= Ivo de Vieuxpont =

13th century Anglo-Norman noble

Ivo de Vieuxpont (died 1239), Lord of Alston Moor, Sorbie and Cuverville, was an Anglo-Norman noble.

Ivo was a son of William de Vieuxpont and Maud de Morville. Ivo supported John, King of England. Known as one of the counsellors of John, he was appointed governor of Mountsorrel castle. Ivo was identified as an enemy of Henry III of England, and his lands in Northamptonshire were given to his brother Robert de Vieuxpont.

== Marriage and issue ==
Ivo married Isabel, daughter of William de Lancaster and Helwise de Stuteville. They had the following children:

- Robert de Vieuxpont, Lord of Cuverville, married Marie de sainte Beuve, without issue.
- Lawrence de Vieuxpont
- Nicholas de Vieuxpont, Lord of Alston Moor.
- Joan de Vieuxpont
- Jane de Vieuxpont

Ivo next married Sybilia, daughter of Bernard de Thoresby, but the marriage was childless.
