= Mathieu, Calvados =

Mathieu
- Commune
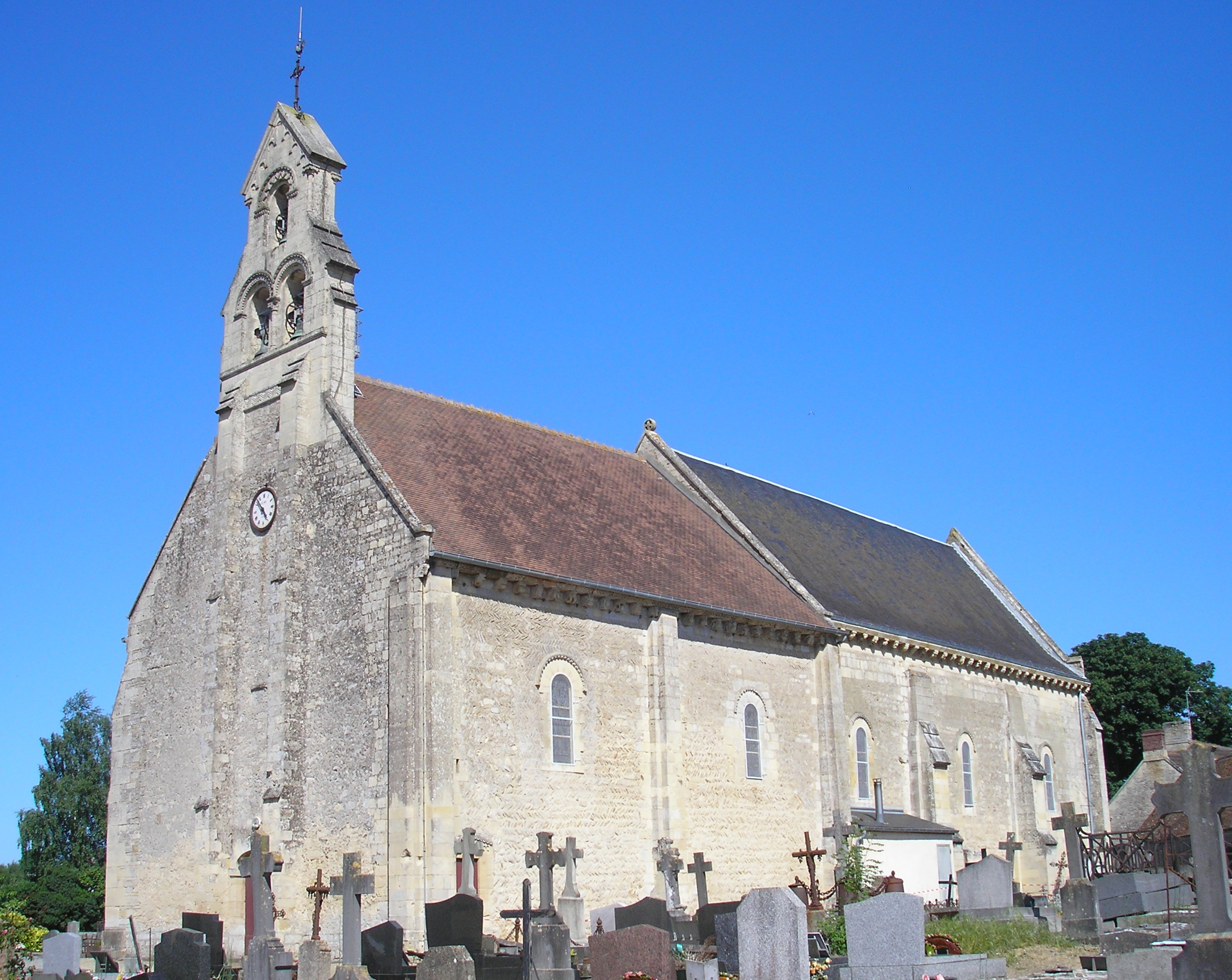
- The church in Mathieu
- Location of Mathieu
- Location within France Location within Normandy
- Coordinates: 49°15′21″N 0°22′19″W
- Country: France
- Region: Normandy
- Department: Calvados
- Arrondissement: Caen
- Canton: Ouistreham
- Intercommunality: CU Caen la Mer

Government
  - Mayor (2020–2026): Philippe Mars
- Area^{1}: 9.41 km^{2} (3.63 sq mi)
- Highest elevation: 59 m (194 ft)
- Lowest elevation: 30 m (98 ft)
- Population (2023): 2,331
  - Density: 248/km^{2} (642/sq mi)
- Time zone: UTC+01:00 (CET)
  - Summer (DST): UTC+02:00 (CEST)
- INSEE/Postal code: 14407 /14920
- ^{1} French Land Register data, which excludes lakes, ponds, glaciers > 1 km^{2} (0.386 sq mi or 247 acres) and river estuaries.

Mathieu (French pronunciation: [matjø]) is a commune in the Calvados department in the Normandy region in northwestern France.

== Population ==
Historical population
Year	Pop.	±% p.a.
1968	964	—
1975	1,100	+1.90%
1982	1,255	+1.90%
1990	1,577	+2.90%
1999	1,625	+0.33%
2007	1,947	+2.29%
2012	1,957	+0.10%
2017	2,223	+2.58%
2023	2,331	+0.79%
Source: INSEE

== See also ==
- Communes of the Calvados department
