= Démouville =

- Commune
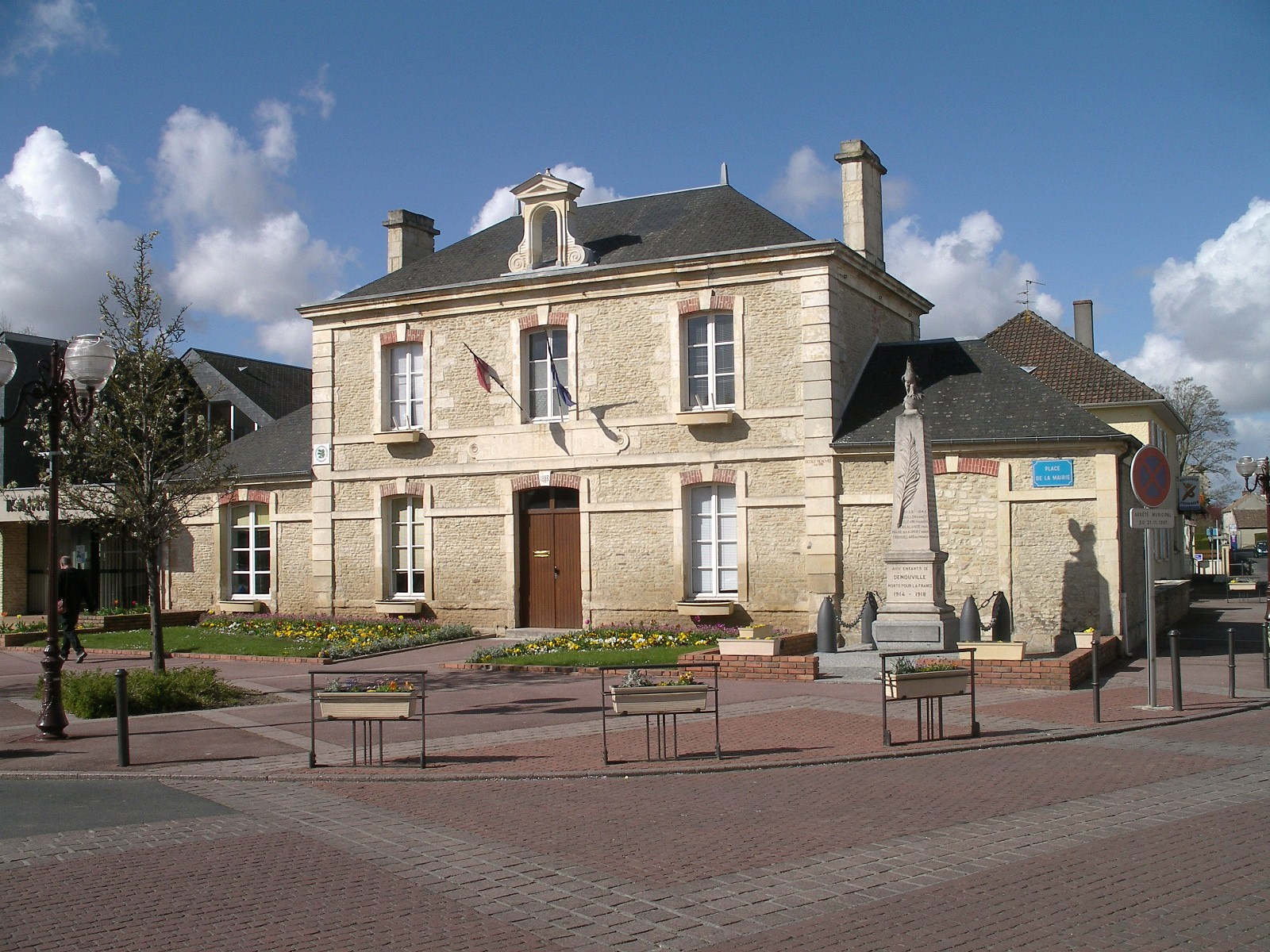
- The town hall in Démouville

- Coat of arms
- Location of Démouville
- Location within France Location within Normandy
- Coordinates: 49°10′54″N 0°16′03″W
- Country: France
- Region: Normandy
- Department: Calvados
- Arrondissement: Caen
- Canton: Troarn
- Intercommunality: CU Caen la Mer

Government
  - Mayor (2023–2026): Cédric Cassigneul
- Area^{1}: 3.56 km^{2} (1.37 sq mi)
- Elevation: 19 m (62 ft)
- Highest elevation: 29 m (95 ft)
- Lowest elevation: 13 m (43 ft)
- Population (2023): 3,035
  - Density: 853/km^{2} (2,210/sq mi)
- Time zone: UTC+01:00 (CET)
  - Summer (DST): UTC+02:00 (CEST)
- INSEE/Postal code: 14221 /14840
- ^{1} French Land Register data, which excludes lakes, ponds, glaciers > 1 km^{2} (0.386 sq mi or 247 acres) and river estuaries.

Démouville (French pronunciation: [demuvil]) is a commune in the Calvados department in the Normandy region in northwestern France.

== Geography ==
A watercourse, Le Biez, flows through the commune.

== Population ==
Historical population
Year	Pop.	±% p.a.
1968	1,045	—
1975	1,373	+3.98%
1982	2,165	+6.72%
1990	2,495	+1.79%
1999	3,052	+2.26%
2007	3,153	+0.41%
2012	3,297	+0.90%
2017	3,189	−0.66%
2023	3,035	−0.82%
Source: INSEE

== See also ==
- Communes of the Calvados department
