= Épron =

- Commune
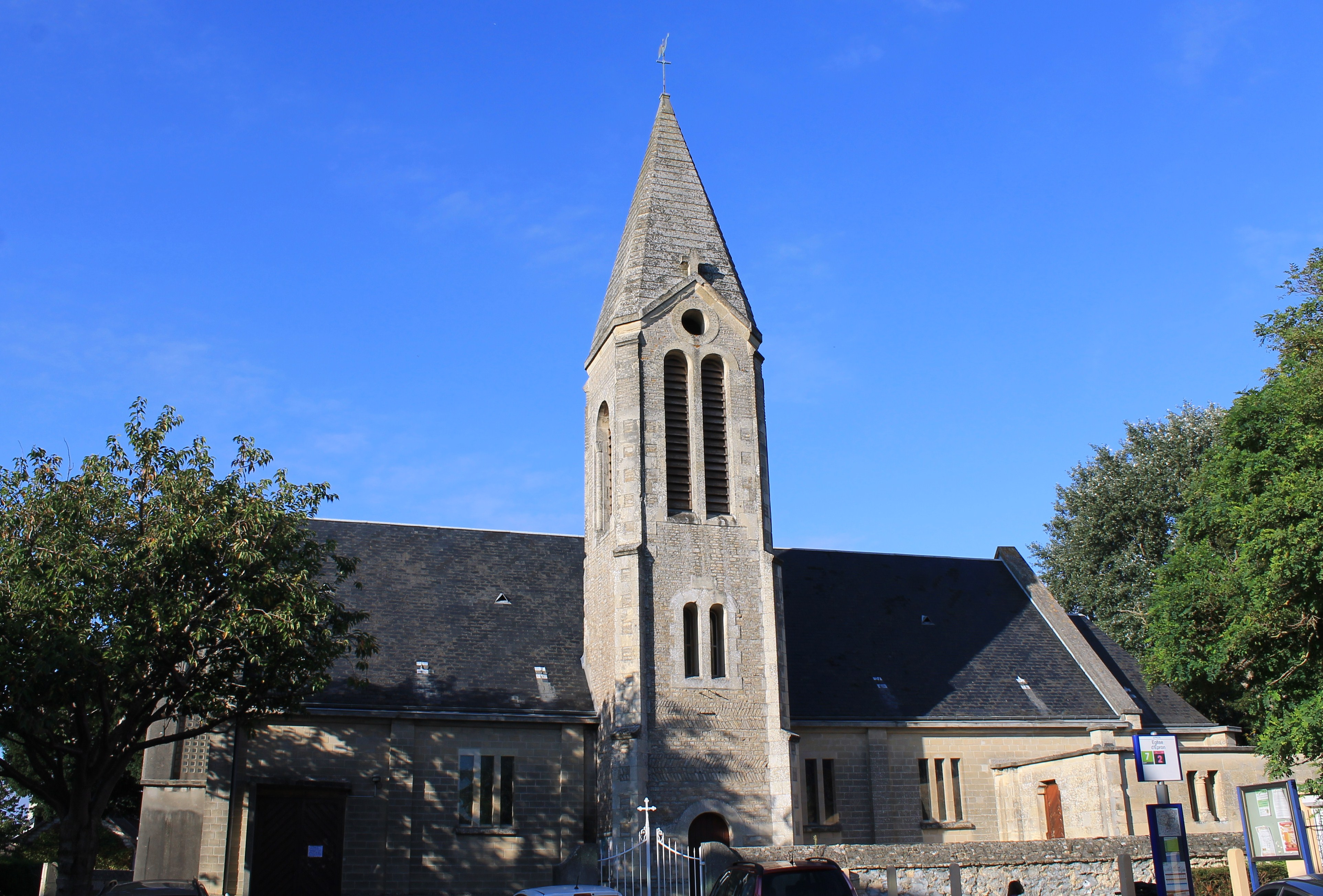
- The church in Épron

- Coat of arms
- Location of Épron
- Location within France Location within Normandy
- Coordinates: 49°13′22″N 0°22′12″W
- Country: France
- Region: Normandy
- Department: Calvados
- Arrondissement: Caen
- Canton: Caen-3
- Intercommunality: Caen la Mer

Government
  - Mayor (2020–2026): Franck Guéguéniat
- Area^{1}: 1.42 km^{2} (0.55 sq mi)
- Elevation: 56 m (184 ft)
- Highest elevation: 60 m (200 ft)
- Lowest elevation: 25 m (82 ft)
- Population (2023): 2,093
  - Density: 1,470/km^{2} (3,820/sq mi)
- Time zone: UTC+01:00 (CET)
  - Summer (DST): UTC+02:00 (CEST)
- INSEE/Postal code: 14242 /14610
- ^{1} French Land Register data, which excludes lakes, ponds, glaciers > 1 km^{2} (0.386 sq mi or 247 acres) and river estuaries.

Épron (French pronunciation: [epʁɔ̃]) is a commune in the Calvados department in the Normandy region in northwestern France.

== Population ==
Historical population
Year	Pop.	±% p.a.
1968	325	—
1975	568	+8.30%
1982	858	+6.07%
1990	1,425	+6.55%
1999	1,755	+2.34%
2007	1,616	−1.03%
2012	1,577	−0.49%
2017	1,634	+0.71%
2023	2,093	+4.21%
Source: INSEE

== See also ==
- Communes of the Calvados department
