= Verson =

- Commune
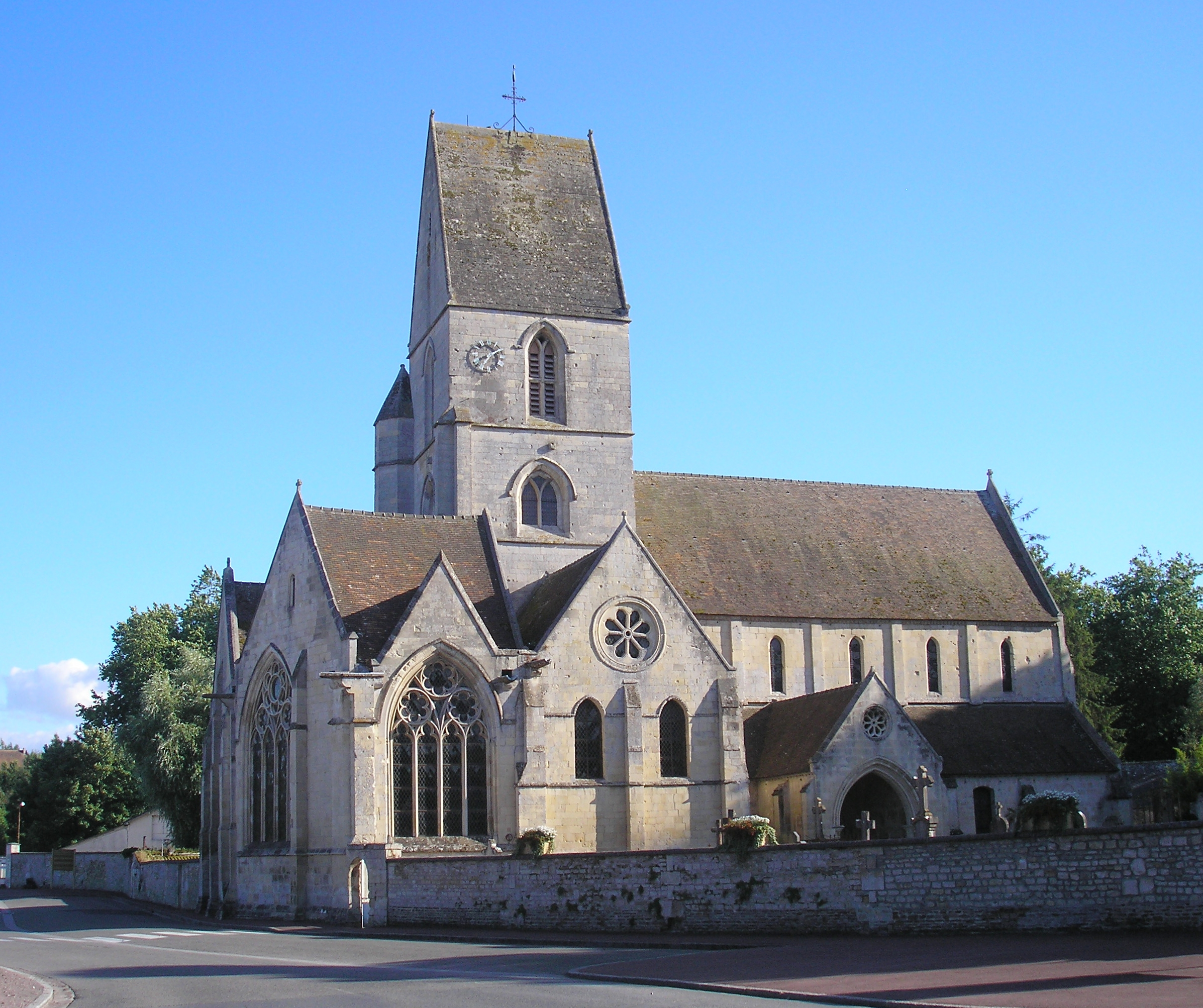
- The church in Verson

- Coat of arms
- Location of Verson
- Location within France Location within Normandy
- Coordinates: 49°09′20″N 0°27′03″W
- Country: France
- Region: Normandy
- Department: Calvados
- Arrondissement: Caen
- Canton: Caen-1
- Intercommunality: CU Caen la Mer

Government
  - Mayor (2020–2026): Nathalie Donatin
- Area^{1}: 10.36 km^{2} (4.00 sq mi)
- Elevation: 83 m (272 ft)
- Highest elevation: 93 m (305 ft)
- Lowest elevation: 12 m (39 ft)
- Population (2023): 4,059
  - Density: 391.8/km^{2} (1,015/sq mi)
- Time zone: UTC+01:00 (CET)
  - Summer (DST): UTC+02:00 (CEST)
- INSEE/Postal code: 14738 /14790
- ^{1} French Land Register data, which excludes lakes, ponds, glaciers > 1 km^{2} (0.386 sq mi or 247 acres) and river estuaries.

Verson (French pronunciation: [vɛʁsɔ̃]) is a commune in the Calvados department in the Normandy region in northwestern France.

== Geography ==
The river Odon flows through the commune.

== Population ==
Historical population

| Year | Pop. | ±% p.a. |
|---|---|---|
| 1793 | 1,061 | — |
| 1800 | 1,021 | −0.55% |
| 1806 | 1,347 | +4.73% |
| 1821 | 1,102 | −1.33% |
| 1831 | 1,280 | +1.51% |
| 1836 | 1,285 | +0.08% |
| 1841 | 1,270 | −0.23% |
| 1846 | 1,275 | +0.08% |
| 1851 | 1,167 | −1.75% |
| 1856 | 1,215 | +0.81% |
| 1861 | 1,206 | −0.15% |
| 1866 | 1,171 | −0.59% |
| 1872 | 1,040 | −1.96% |
| 1876 | 1,023 | −0.41% |
| 1881 | 933 | −1.82% |
| 1886 | 895 | −0.83% |
| 1891 | 875 | −0.45% |
| 1896 | 804 | −1.68% |
| 1901 | 801 | −0.07% |

| Year | Pop. | ±% p.a. |
|---|---|---|
| 1906 | 785 | −0.40% |
| 1911 | 760 | −0.65% |
| 1921 | 734 | −0.35% |
| 1926 | 694 | −1.11% |
| 1931 | 715 | +0.60% |
| 1936 | 722 | +0.20% |
| 1946 | 899 | +2.22% |
| 1954 | 1,002 | +1.37% |
| 1962 | 1,335 | +3.65% |
| 1968 | 1,380 | +0.55% |
| 1975 | 1,743 | +3.39% |
| 1982 | 2,215 | +3.48% |
| 1990 | 3,153 | +4.51% |
| 1999 | 3,580 | +1.42% |
| 2007 | 3,651 | +0.25% |
| 2012 | 3,533 | −0.65% |
| 2017 | 3,616 | +0.47% |
| 2023 | 4,059 | +1.94% |

Source: EHESS and INSEE (1968-2023)

== Points of interest ==
=== National heritage sites ===
The Commune has three buildings and areas listed as a Monument historique

- Église Saint-Germain 12th century church listed as a monument in 1910.
- Croix à Verson 17th century cross, located in the cemetery of Église Saint-Germain, listed as a monument in 1932.
- Manoir de la Fontaine 16th century Manor house, listed as a monument in 1933.

== Notable people ==
- Léopold Sédar Senghor - (1906 – 2001) was a Senegalese politician, cultural theorist and poet who served as the first president of Senegal from 1960 to 1980, died here.

== Twin towns – sister cities ==
Verson, along with Tourville-sur-Odon is twinned with:

- Hambühren, Germany
- Buk, Poland

== See also ==
- Communes of the Calvados department
