= Hambühren =

Municipality in Celle district, Lower Saxony, Germany

- Municipality
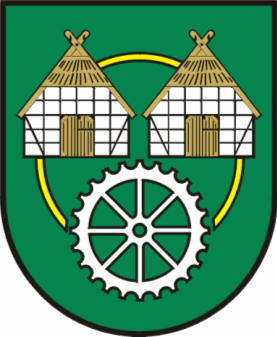
- Coat of arms

- Location of Hambühren within Celle district
- Interactive map of Hambühren
- Location within Germany Location within Lower Saxony
- Coordinates: 52°38′N 09°59′E
- Country: Germany
- State: Lower Saxony
- District: Celle

Government
  - Mayor (2019–24): Thomas Kranz

Area
  - Total: 56.81 km^{2} (21.93 sq mi)
- Elevation: 36 m (118 ft)

Population (2025-12-31)
  - Total: 10,110
  - Density: 178.0/km^{2} (460.9/sq mi)
- Time zone: UTC+01:00 (CET)
  - Summer (DST): UTC+02:00 (CEST)
- Postal codes: 29313
- Dialling codes: 05084, 05143 (Oldau)
- Vehicle registration: CE
- Website: www.hambuehren.de

Hambühren (German pronunciation: [hamˈbyːʁən]) is a municipality in the district of Celle, in Lower Saxony, Germany. It is situated approximately 7 km (4.3 mi) west of Celle.

== History ==
From the summer of 1944 to February 1945, a satellite camp of Bergen-Belsen concentration camp was in operation at Hambühren. Guarded by SS staff, around 400 female prisoners were forced to expand the former potash mine and to lay train tracks to it, work carried out by the company Hochtief. The tunnels were intended as an underground production site for Bremen plane manufacturer Focke-Wulf.

== Twin towns – sister cities ==
Hambühren is twinned with:

- Verson, France
- Tourville-sur-Odon, France
