= Orne (Normandy river) =

River in France

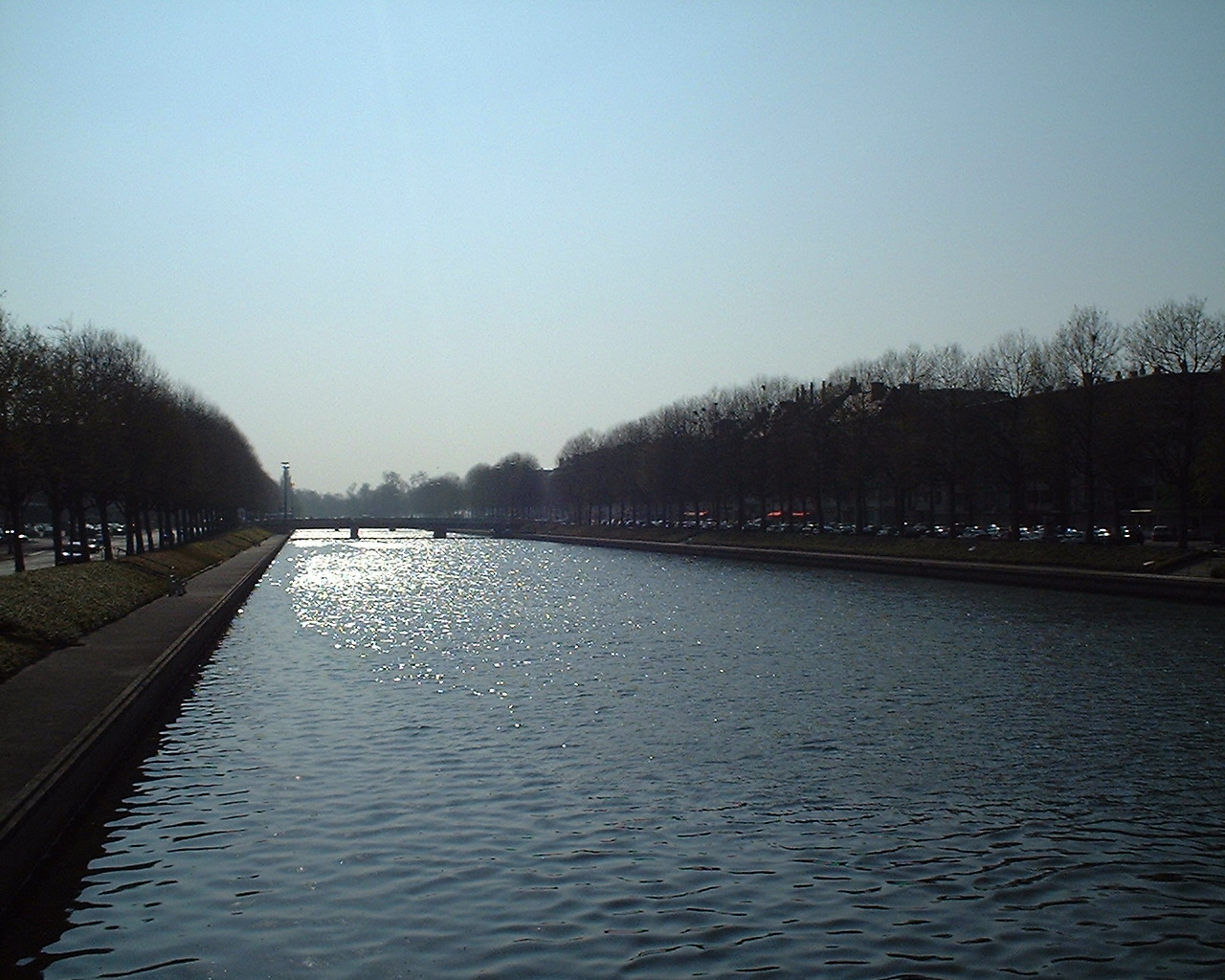
- The Orne in Caen

- Location within France Location within Normandy
- Native name: L'Orne (f) (French)

Location
- Country: France

Physical characteristics
- Source
  - location: Aunou-sur-Orne
  - elevation: 240 m (790 ft)
- Mouth
  - location: English Channel
  - coordinates: 49°16′42″N 0°13′34″W
- Length: 170 km (110 mi)
- Basin size: 2,932 km^{2} (1,132 sq mi)
- Discharge
  - average: 27.5 m^{3}/s (970 cu ft/s)

The Orne (French: [ɔʁn]) is a river in Normandy, within northwestern France. It is 170 km (110 mi) long. It discharges into the English Channel at the port of Ouistreham. Its source is in Aunou-sur-Orne, east of Sées. Its main tributaries are the Odon and the Rouvre.

== Geography ==
The Orne flows through the following departments and towns:

- Orne (named after the river): Sées, Argentan
- Calvados: Thury-Harcourt, Saint-André-sur-Orne, Caen, Ouistreham

It also flows through the areas known as Suisse Normande and the Plaine d'Argentan.

Its longest tributaries are, from source to mouth:

- Don
- Ure
- Cance
- Udon
- Baize
- Rouvre
- Noireau
- Laize
- Odon

=== Lac de Rabodanges ===
In 1960 a dam at Rabodanges in Putanges-le-Lac was built by along the course of the Orne. The dam created a 6 km artificial lake covering almost 240 acres, making it the largest lake in Lower Normandy. The lake is now a popular tourist destination and had a designated swimming area opened in August 2022.

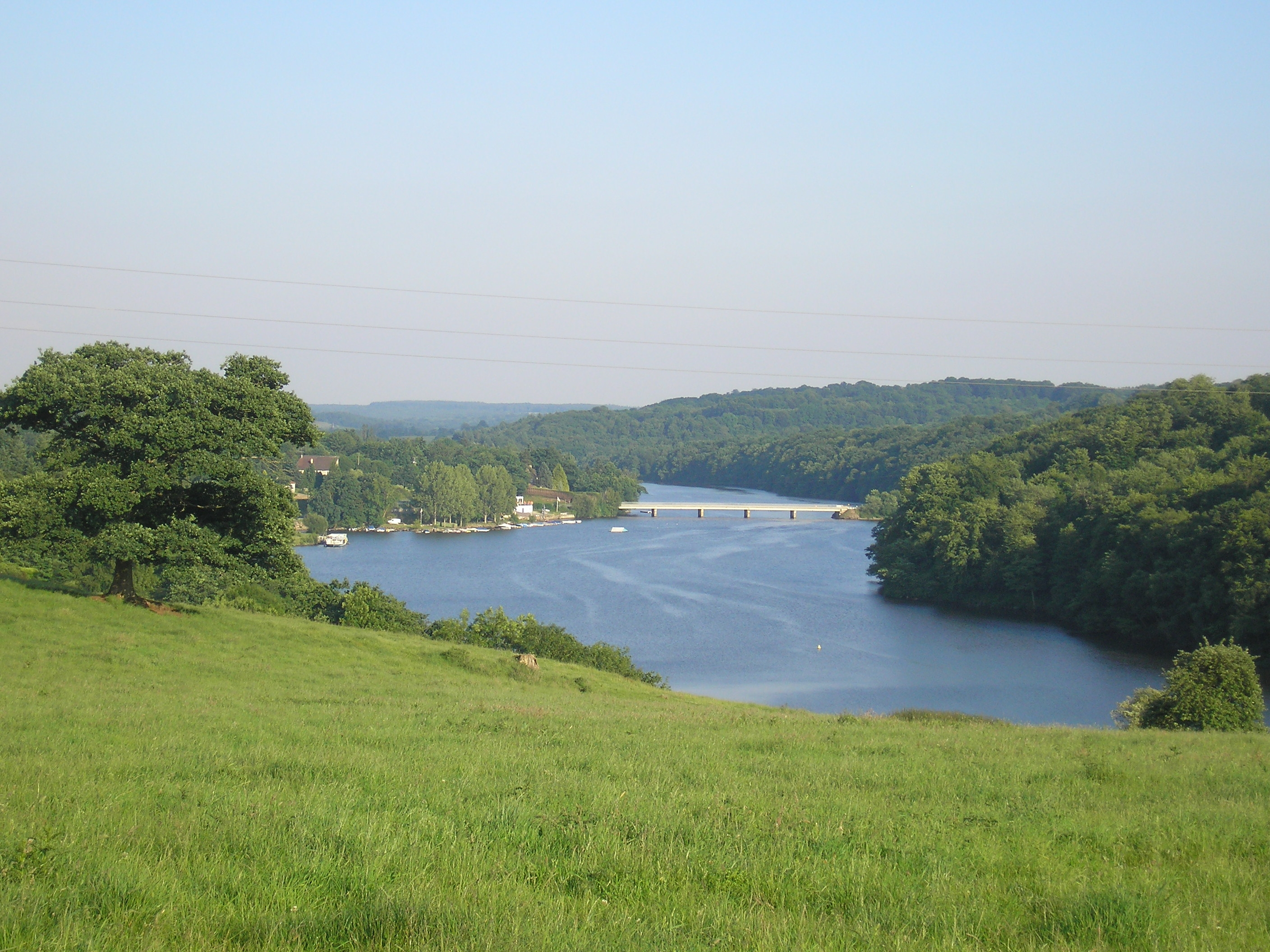
Lac de Rabodanges

== Name ==
The name of the Orne in Normandy, which is referred to as the Olinas by Ptolemy, is a homonym of Fluvius Olne, the Orne saosnoise in Sarthe, which Xavier Delamarre traces back to the Celtic olīnā (elbow).

== Hydrology and water quality ==
The waters of the Orne are typically moderately turbid and brown in colour. Its pH level has been measured at 8.5 at the town of St. Andre sur Orne where summer water temperatures approximate 18 °C (64 °F). Electrical conductivity of the water has been measured at 30 microsiemens per centimeter.

== See also ==
- Canal de Caen à la Mer
- Operation Tonga
