= Saint-Aubin-d'Arquenay =

- Commune
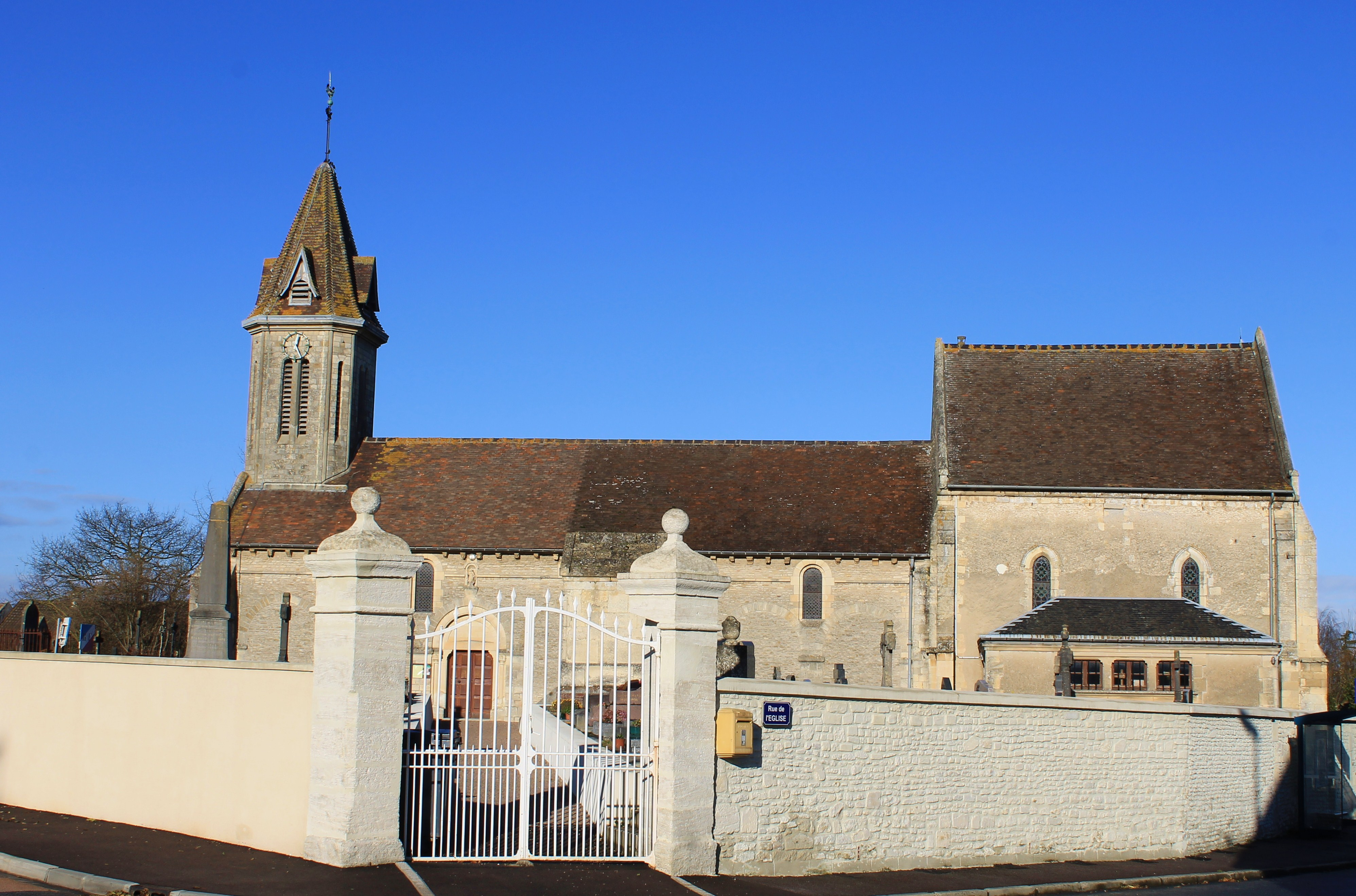
- The church in Saint-Aubin-d'Arquenay

- Coat of arms
- Location of Saint-Aubin-d'Arquenay
- Location within France Location within Normandy
- Coordinates: 49°15′47″N 0°17′15″W
- Country: France
- Region: Normandy
- Department: Calvados
- Arrondissement: Caen
- Canton: Ouistreham
- Intercommunality: CU Caen la Mer

Government
  - Mayor (2020–2026): Bertin George
- Area^{1}: 3.29 km^{2} (1.27 sq mi)
- Elevation: 32 m (105 ft)
- Highest elevation: 46 m (151 ft)
- Lowest elevation: 14 m (46 ft)
- Population (2023): 1,118
  - Density: 340/km^{2} (880/sq mi)
- Time zone: UTC+01:00 (CET)
  - Summer (DST): UTC+02:00 (CEST)
- INSEE/Postal code: 14558 /14970
- ^{1} French Land Register data, which excludes lakes, ponds, glaciers > 1 km^{2} (0.386 sq mi or 247 acres) and river estuaries.

Saint-Aubin-d'Arquenay (French pronunciation: [sɛ̃.t‿obɛ̃ daʁkənɛ]) is a commune in the Calvados department in the Normandy region in northwestern France.

== Population ==
Historical population
Year	Pop.	±% p.a.
1968	326	—
1975	403	+3.08%
1982	504	+3.25%
1990	567	+1.48%
1999	633	+1.23%
2007	798	+2.94%
2012	782	−0.40%
2017	1,070	+6.47%
2023	1,118	+0.73%
Source: INSEE

== See also ==
- Communes of the Calvados department
