= Cambes-en-Plaine =

- Commune
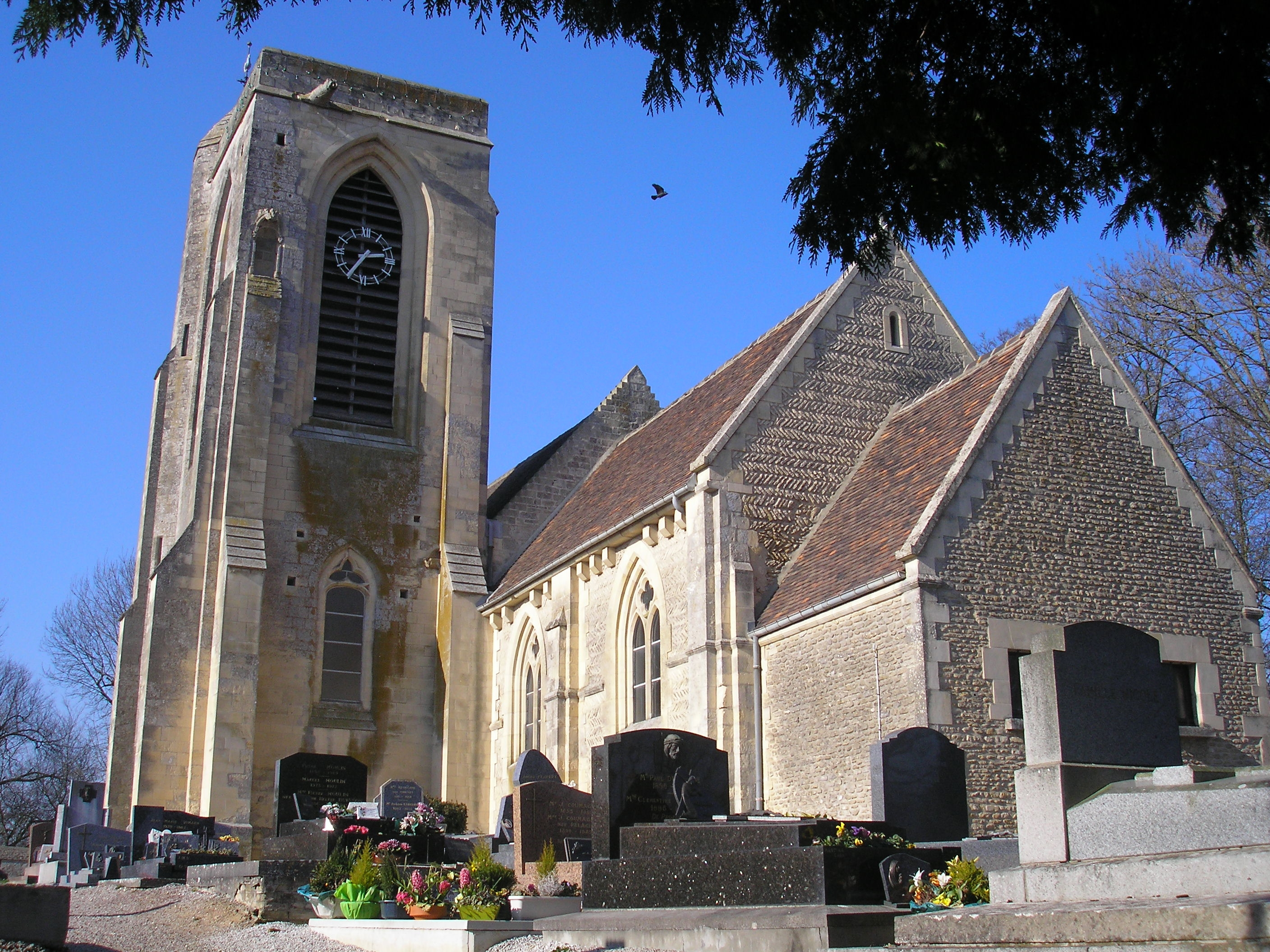
- The church in Cambes-en-Plaine
- Location of Cambes-en-Plaine
- Location within France Location within Normandy
- Coordinates: 49°14′00″N 0°23′01″W
- Country: France
- Region: Normandy
- Department: Calvados
- Arrondissement: Caen
- Canton: Ouistreham
- Intercommunality: Caen la Mer

Government
  - Mayor (2020–2026): Élisabeth Holler
- Area^{1}: 3.25 km^{2} (1.25 sq mi)
- Elevation: 55 m (180 ft)
- Highest elevation: 66 m (217 ft)
- Lowest elevation: 47 m (154 ft)
- Population (2023): 1,830
  - Density: 563/km^{2} (1,460/sq mi)
- Time zone: UTC+01:00 (CET)
  - Summer (DST): UTC+02:00 (CEST)
- INSEE/Postal code: 14125 /14610
- ^{1} French Land Register data, which excludes lakes, ponds, glaciers > 1 km^{2} (0.386 sq mi or 247 acres) and river estuaries.

Cambes-en-Plaine (French pronunciation: [kɑ̃b ɑ̃ plɛn]) is a commune in the Calvados department in the Normandy region in northwestern France.

== Population ==
Historical population
Year	Pop.	±% p.a.
1968	332	—
1975	309	−1.02%
1982	792	+14.39%
1990	972	+2.59%
1999	1,493	+4.88%
2007	1,474	−0.16%
2012	1,417	−0.79%
2017	1,722	+3.98%
2023	1,830	+1.02%
Source: INSEE

== See also ==
- Communes of the Calvados department
