= Colleville-Montgomery =

- Commune
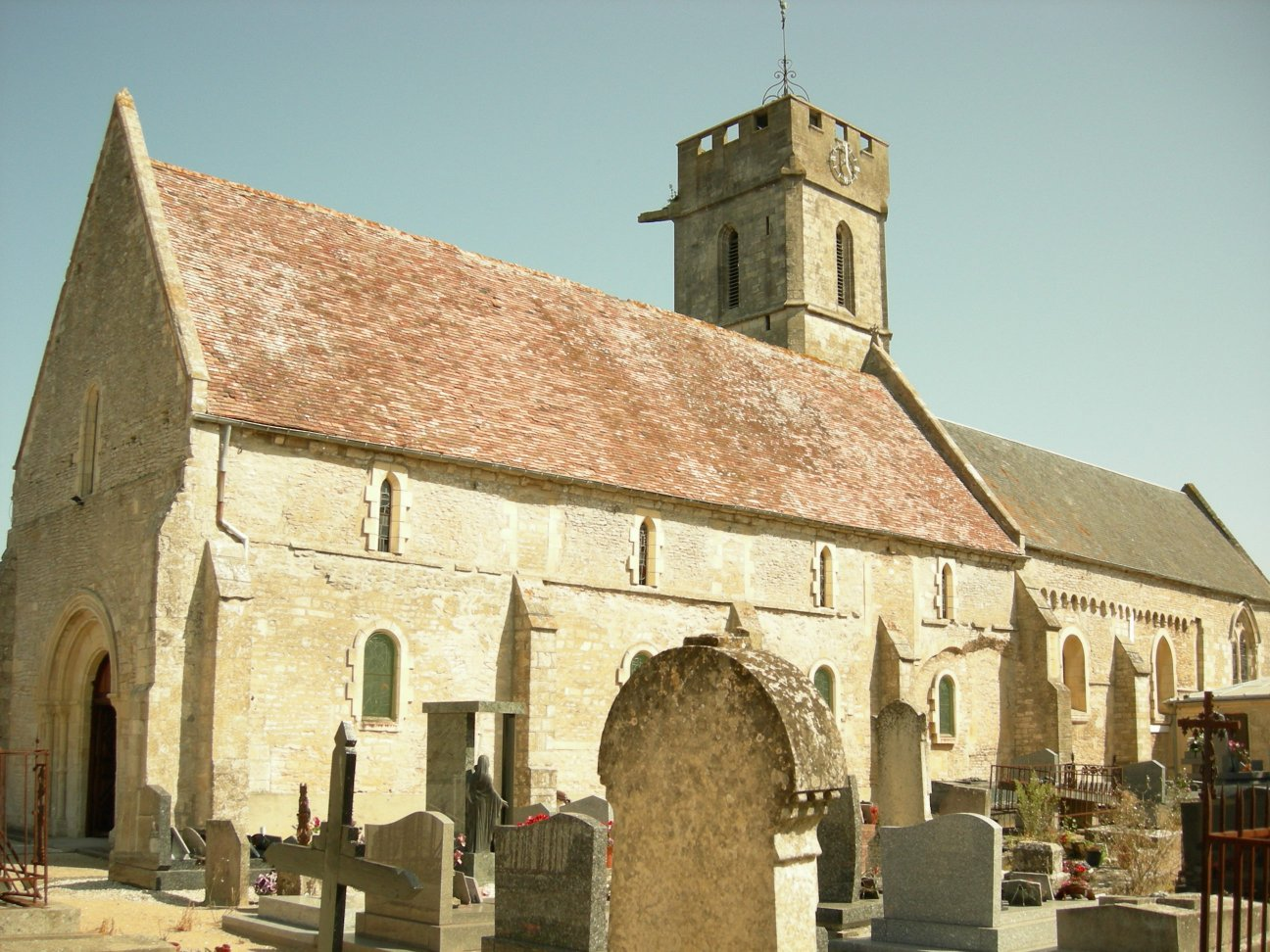
- The church in Colleville-Montgomery

- Coat of arms
- Location of Colleville-Montgomery
- Location within France Location within Normandy
- Coordinates: 49°17′00″N 0°18′00″W
- Country: France
- Region: Normandy
- Department: Calvados
- Arrondissement: Caen
- Canton: Ouistreham
- Intercommunality: CU Caen la Mer

Government
  - Mayor (2020–2026): Frédéric Loinard
- Area^{1}: 7.74 km^{2} (2.99 sq mi)
- Elevation: 10 m (33 ft)
- Highest elevation: 58 m (190 ft)
- Lowest elevation: 3 m (9.8 ft)
- Population (2023): 2,586
  - Density: 334/km^{2} (865/sq mi)
- Time zone: UTC+01:00 (CET)
  - Summer (DST): UTC+02:00 (CEST)
- INSEE/Postal code: 14166 /14880
- ^{1} French Land Register data, which excludes lakes, ponds, glaciers > 1 km^{2} (0.386 sq mi or 247 acres) and river estuaries.

Colleville-Montgomery (French pronunciation: [kɔlvil mɔ̃ɡɔmʁi]; formerly Colleville-sur-Orne) is a commune in the Calvados department in the Normandy region in northern France.

== History ==
The town was known as Colleville-sur-Orne until 13 June 1946 to distinguish it from another town in the department, also in a coastal location, Colleville-sur-Mer; It became Colleville-Montgomery as a tribute to General Bernard Montgomery (1887–1976), commander of the allied land forces during the Battle of Normandy. There are two neighbouring towns in Calvados called Sainte-Foy-de-Montgommery and Saint-Germain-de-Montgommery, but they are named for distant ancestors of Montgomery who were part of William the Conqueror's invading army in 1066 and settled in England. The town was featured in the 1962 film, The Longest Day, detailing the French Resistance and their efforts on D-Day.

== Sights ==
- The Church

Built by Saint-Vigor, Bishop of the city of Bayeux (511–531), during the 11th and 12th centuries, it has two choirs and a Romanesque nave.

The first bay consists in barrel vaults. The other vaults are more recent, built at the same time as the arches which lead to the second choir, from the thirteenth century.

The side tower from the twelfth century for the lower part is of Romanesque design, and from the fifteenth century for the upper part with a terrace on top surrounded by a parapet, and contains three bells. The bell tower, partially destroyed during the liberation of the area, was reconstructed.

The windows were designed in the style of Gothic architecture and their stained glass were restored after World War II.

- Hillman Fortress

Built by the German army in 1942, it consists of a complex of bunkers which are being restored since 1990 by an association called "Les Amis du Suffolk Régiment". Free guided visits are organised during the summer.

- La Redoute

Located at the end of Vauban street, this fortification was built in 1779 according to a design by Vauban. Half of it still remains visible.

- Statue of Bill Millin

The statue of Bill Millin, the "mad piper" of D-day June 6, 1944, can be found in the village. It was put up with great ceremony three years after his death (2010), in 2013.

== Tourism ==
There is a camping place located about 200 m from the beach.

== Population ==
Historical population
Year	Pop.	±% p.a.
1968	563	—
1975	780	+4.77%
1982	1,430	+9.05%
1990	1,926	+3.79%
1999	1,925	−0.01%
2007	2,223	+1.82%
2012	2,294	+0.63%
2017	2,437	+1.22%
2023	2,586	+0.99%
Source: INSEE

== International relations ==
Colleville-Montgomery is twinned with:

- Kleinrinderfeld, Germany

== See also ==
- Colleville-sur-Mer
- Communes of the Calvados department
