= Tourville-sur-Odon =

- Commune
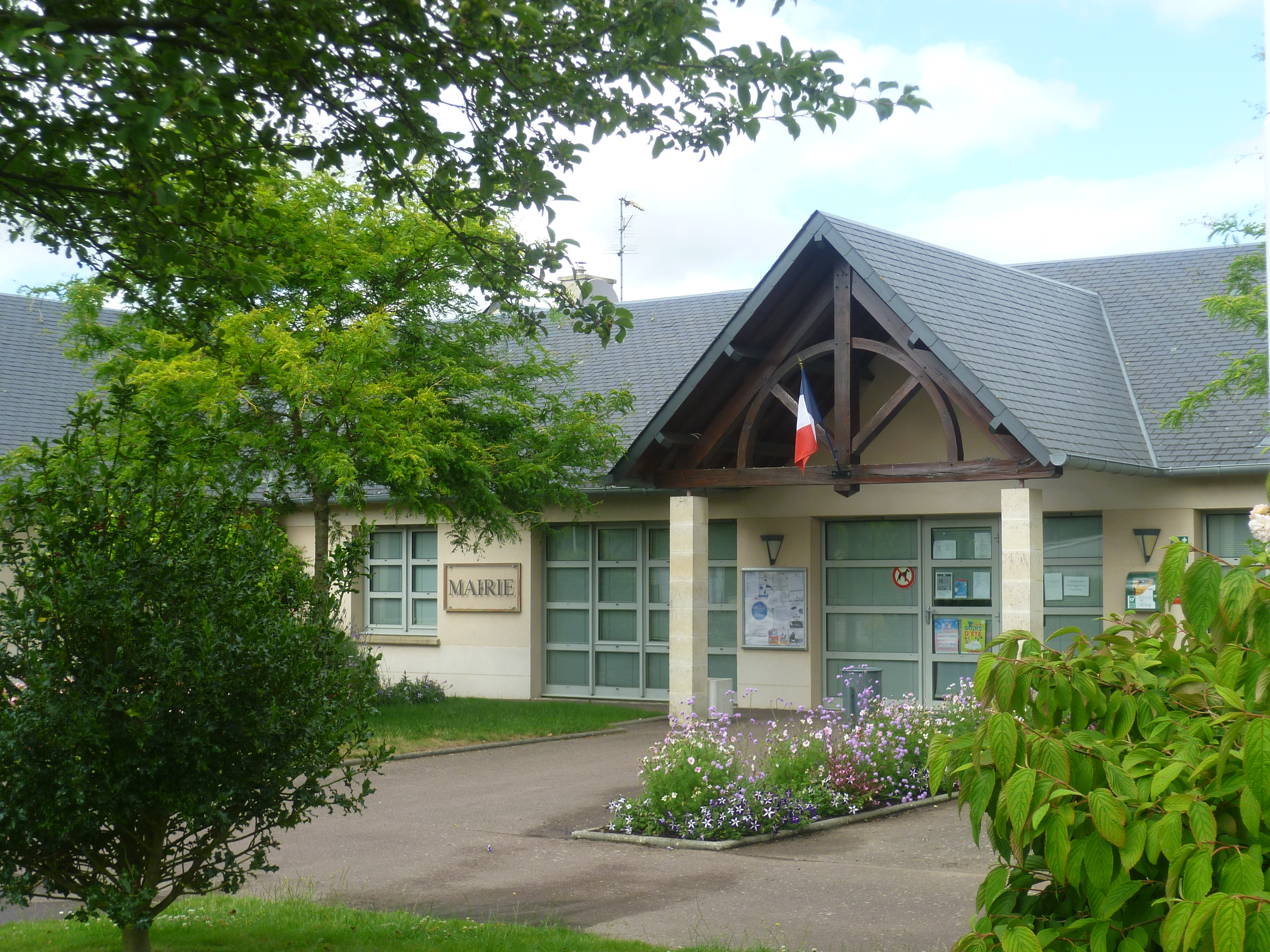
- The town hall in Tourville-sur-Odon

- Coat of arms
- Location of Tourville-sur-Odon
- Location within France Location within Normandy
- Coordinates: 49°08′30″N 0°30′03″W
- Country: France
- Region: Normandy
- Department: Calvados
- Arrondissement: Caen
- Canton: Caen-1
- Intercommunality: CU Caen la Mer

Government
  - Mayor (2020–2026): Didier Bouley
- Area^{1}: 1.70 km^{2} (0.66 sq mi)
- Elevation: 70 m (230 ft)
- Highest elevation: 88 m (289 ft)
- Lowest elevation: 37 m (121 ft)
- Population (2023): 1,153
  - Density: 678/km^{2} (1,760/sq mi)
- Time zone: UTC+01:00 (CET)
  - Summer (DST): UTC+02:00 (CEST)
- INSEE/Postal code: 14707 /14210
- ^{1} French Land Register data, which excludes lakes, ponds, glaciers > 1 km^{2} (0.386 sq mi or 247 acres) and river estuaries.

Tourville-sur-Odon (French pronunciation: [tuʁvil syʁ ɔdɔ̃], literally Tourville on Odon) is a commune in the Calvados department in the Normandy region in northwestern France.

== Geography ==
The river Odon flows through the commune. In addition a stream the Ruisseau de Sabley traverses the commune.

== Population ==
Historical population
Year	Pop.	±% p.a.
1968	295	—
1975	300	+0.24%
1982	515	+8.03%
1990	889	+7.06%
1999	1,067	+2.05%
2007	1,151	+0.95%
2012	1,048	−1.86%
2017	1,032	−0.31%
2023	1,153	+1.86%
Source: INSEE

== Twin towns – sister cities ==
Tourville-sur-Odon, along with Verson is twinned with:

- Hambühren, Germany
- Buk, Poland

== See also ==
- Communes of the Calvados department
