= Communauté urbaine Caen la Mer =

Coordinates: 49°10′59″N 0°22′10″W

Caen la Mer
- Communauté urbaine
- Location within the Calvados department
- Country: France
- Region: Normandy
- Department: Calvados
- No. of communes: {{{nbcomm}}}
- Established: January 2017

Government
  - President: Joël Bruneau (LR)
- Area: 362.94 km^{2} (140.13 sq mi)
- Population (2018): 268,470
  - Density: 739.71/km^{2} (1,915.8/sq mi)
- Website: www.caenlamer.fr

The communauté urbaine Caen la Mer is the communauté urbaine, an intercommunal structure, centred on the city of Caen. It is located in the Calvados department, in the Normandy region, northwestern France. It was created in January 2017, replacing the previous Communauté d'agglomération Caen la Mer and two communautés de communes. Its area is 362.9 km^{2}. Its population was 268,470 in 2018, of which 105,512 in Caen proper.

== History ==
The communauté urbaine had its origins in the creation in 1990 of a District of Greater Caen (DGC) which consisted of 18 communes.

Since then the grouping transformed itself in 2002 into an Agglomeration called the Communauté d'agglomération du Grand Caen. Since 2004 it has been called the communauté d'agglomération Caen la mer.

The community welcomed ten more member communes on 1 January 2003 and Sannerville on 1 January 2004.

From 1 January 2013, a further six communes were accepted into the agglomeration: three communes from the former Communauté de communes des Rives de l'Odon (which consisted of Tourville-sur-Odon, Verson, and Mouen) and Colleville-Montgomery, Ouistreham, and Saint-André-sur-Orne. This regrouping created an agglomeration of 236,167 inhabitants. In January 2017 the agglomeration community merged with the former commune communities of Entre Thue et Mue and Plaine Sud de Caen, and became an urban community.

The agglomeration staff numbered 650 workers in 2009, with an annual budget of €245 million, of which €95.9 million were investments.

== Presidents of Caen la Mer ==
- 23 November 1990 - 9 April 2001 : Jean-Marie Girault (UDF), Mayor of Caen
- 10 April 2001 - 17 April 2008 : Luc Duncombe (UDF-NC), Deputy Mayor of Caen
- 18 April 2008 - 25 April 2014 : Philippe Duron (PS), Mayor of Caen
- 25 April 2014 - present : Joël Bruneau (The Republicans), Mayor of Caen

== Member communes ==
The communauté urbaine Caen la Mer consists of the following 48 communes:

1. Authie
2. Bénouville
3. Biéville-Beuville
4. Blainville-sur-Orne
5. Bourguébus
6. Bretteville-sur-Odon
7. Caen
8. Cairon
9. Cambes-en-Plaine
10. Carpiquet
11. Le Castelet
12. Castine-en-Plaine
13. Colleville-Montgomery
14. Colombelles
15. Cormelles-le-Royal
16. Cuverville
17. Démouville
18. Épron
19. Éterville
20. Fleury-sur-Orne
21. Giberville
22. Grentheville
23. Hermanville-sur-Mer
24. Hérouville-Saint-Clair
25. Ifs
26. Le Fresne-Camilly
27. Lion-sur-Mer
28. Louvigny
29. Mathieu
30. Mondeville
31. Mouen
32. Ouistreham
33. Périers-sur-le-Dan
34. Rosel
35. Rots
36. Saint-André-sur-Orne
37. Saint-Aubin-d'Arquenay
38. Saint-Contest
39. Saint-Germain-la-Blanche-Herbe
40. Saint-Manvieu-Norrey
41. Sannerville
42. Soliers
43. Thaon
44. Thue et Mue
45. Tourville-sur-Odon
46. Troarn
47. Verson
48. Villons-les-Buissons

== Member communes before 2017 ==
As of 2016 the Communauté d'agglomération Caen la Mer included 35 communes. Of these 35 communes, 17 were also part of the urban unit of Caen. Four communes of the urban unit of Caen (Baron-sur-Odon, Fontaine-Étoupefour, Mondrainville and Rots) were not part of the communauté d'agglomération.

The Commune members send a total of 139 delegates to the community council.

Name	Urban?	Entry Date	No. of Delegates
Authie	No	1990	2
Bénouville	No	2003	2
Biéville-Beuville	No	2003	2
Blainville-sur-Orne	No	2003	3
Bretteville-sur-Odon	Yes	1990	3
Caen	Yes	1990	51
Cambes-en-Plaine	No	1990	2
Carpiquet	Yes	1990	2
Colleville-Montgomery	No	2013	2
Colombelles	Yes	1990	3
Cormelles-le-Royal	Yes	1990	3
Cuverville	Yes	1990	2
Démouville	Yes	1990	2
Épron	Yes	1990	2
Éterville	No	2003	2
Fleury-sur-Orne	Yes	1990	3
Giberville	Yes	1990	3
Hermanville-sur-Mer	No	2003	2
Hérouville-Saint-Clair	Yes	1990	8
Ifs	Yes	1990	5
Lion-sur-Mer	No	2003	2
Louvigny	No	1990	2
Mathieu	No	2003	2
Mondeville	Yes	1990	4
Mouen	Yes	2013	2
Ouistreham	No	2013	4
Périers-sur-le-Dan	No	2003	2
Saint-André-sur-Orne	No	2013	2
Saint-Aubin-d'Arquenay	No	2003	2
Saint-Contest	No	1990	2
Saint-Germain-la-Blanche-Herbe	Yes	1990	2
Sannerville	No	2004	2
Tourville-sur-Odon	Yes	2013	2
Verson	Yes	2013	3
Villons-les-Buissons	No	2003	2

== Skills ==
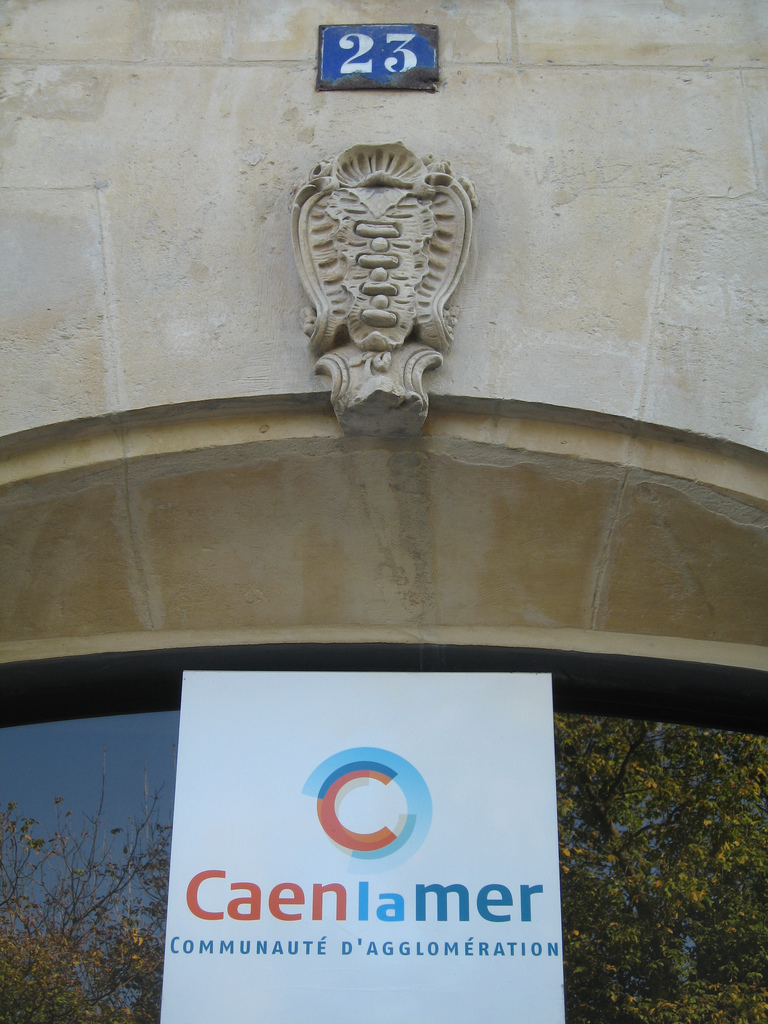
21 place de la République in Caen, the seat of Caen la mer

In accordance with the provisions of the Chevènement Act of 12 July 1999, the responsibilities delegated by the member municipalities of Caen La Mer are divided into three groups:

- Required skills
- Facilitative skills and
- Optional skills

These were determined by the decision of the Community Council of 21 January 2005.

The communauté d'agglomération collects only one tax: a business tax (TP) of 16.06% per annum of the rental value of buildings.

=== Required Skills ===
==== Economic Development ====
- The creation, development, maintenance and management of areas of industrial, commercial, services, handicrafts, tourism, ports, and airport activities (e.g. Port of Caen, Caen – Carpiquet Airport) in the interests of the community
- Economic development activities recognized as of community interest with the SEM Normandy development and the agency Synergia.

==== Development of Community spaces ====
- Planning Territorial Coherence and master plan
- Design and production of ZAC recognized developments in the community interest
- Organisation of Urban Transport. In this context, the community is associated with the General Council of Calvados in a joint union called Viacités, the transport organizing authority of the agglomeration, to whom it delegates its public transport network - the bus and tram network Twisto.

==== Social balance of housing ====
- the Local Habitat Program (PLH), signed in 2003, for the annual construction of 1,400 housing units, including 400 for social security, until 2010
- Housing policy in the community interest
- Actions and financial aid for social housing recognized as being in the community interest
- Reserve land for the implementation of the EU's social policy for a balanced habitat
- Actions, by operations of community interest, for housing for the poor
- Improvement of the housing stock of the community

==== City Policy ====
Contractual arrangements for urban development, local development and the economic and social integration of community interests (e.g. the City Contract and Urban Contract for social cohesion, the Grand City project and ANRU convention, and the local integration program for the economy (PLIE)

- Local measures in the community interest to prevent delinquency
- Counselling to prevent delinquency and local security measures.

=== Optional Skills ===
==== Roads ====
- Creation or development and maintenance of roads recognized to be in the community interest
- Creation or development and management of parking areas recognized to be in the community interest.

==== Sanitation ====
The community has all the skills of the member communes to monitor, collect and treat wastewater through two stations.

- Protection and enhancement of the environment:

Fight against air pollution
Fight against nuisance noise
Collect and eliminate or use waste from households and other waste through the management of five civic recycling centres.

=== Facilitative Skills ===
- Security and control of fire:

Participation in the Fire and Rescue service (SDIS)

- Secretariat of the security committee of the town
- Actions for higher education:

Actions and research on public and private higher education in the community interest.

- Telecommunications network:

Creation of a telecommunications network available for all

- Fight against floods
- Welcoming of vagrants
- Planning and Land Management.
- Culture and Sports: construction, development, maintenance and management of cultural and sports facilities recognized to be in the community interest

the swimming pools at the Aquatic Stadia in the Grace of God, the Chemin-Vert, and the Montmorency districts, and the ice-skating rink.

- Libraries: at Caen, Hérouville, and Ifs;
- Theatres: Champ Exquisite at Blainville and Jean-Vilar at Ifs;
- Cinemas: Le Lux and Le Café des images
- Conservatory and the musical season of the Caen Orchestra
- School of Fine Arts and Media of Caen
- Management of Union House
- Suburban parks and rural areas:

development and management of suburban parks in the agglomeration
development of rural areas within the jurisdiction of the communes

- Littoral

maintenance and management of angle parking areas and municipal government levees.
find means to supervise and monitor places of swimming and water activities, subject to the exercise of police powers by the mayors
monitoring and maintenance of beaches subject to the exercise of police powers by the mayors

- Development and promotional activities in the community interest such as:

Provision to the member communes of means to take Community action (especially in the context of Article L5211-56 of the General Code for Local Authorities)

== See also ==
- Caen Guided Light Transit
