= Saint-André-sur-Orne =

- Commune
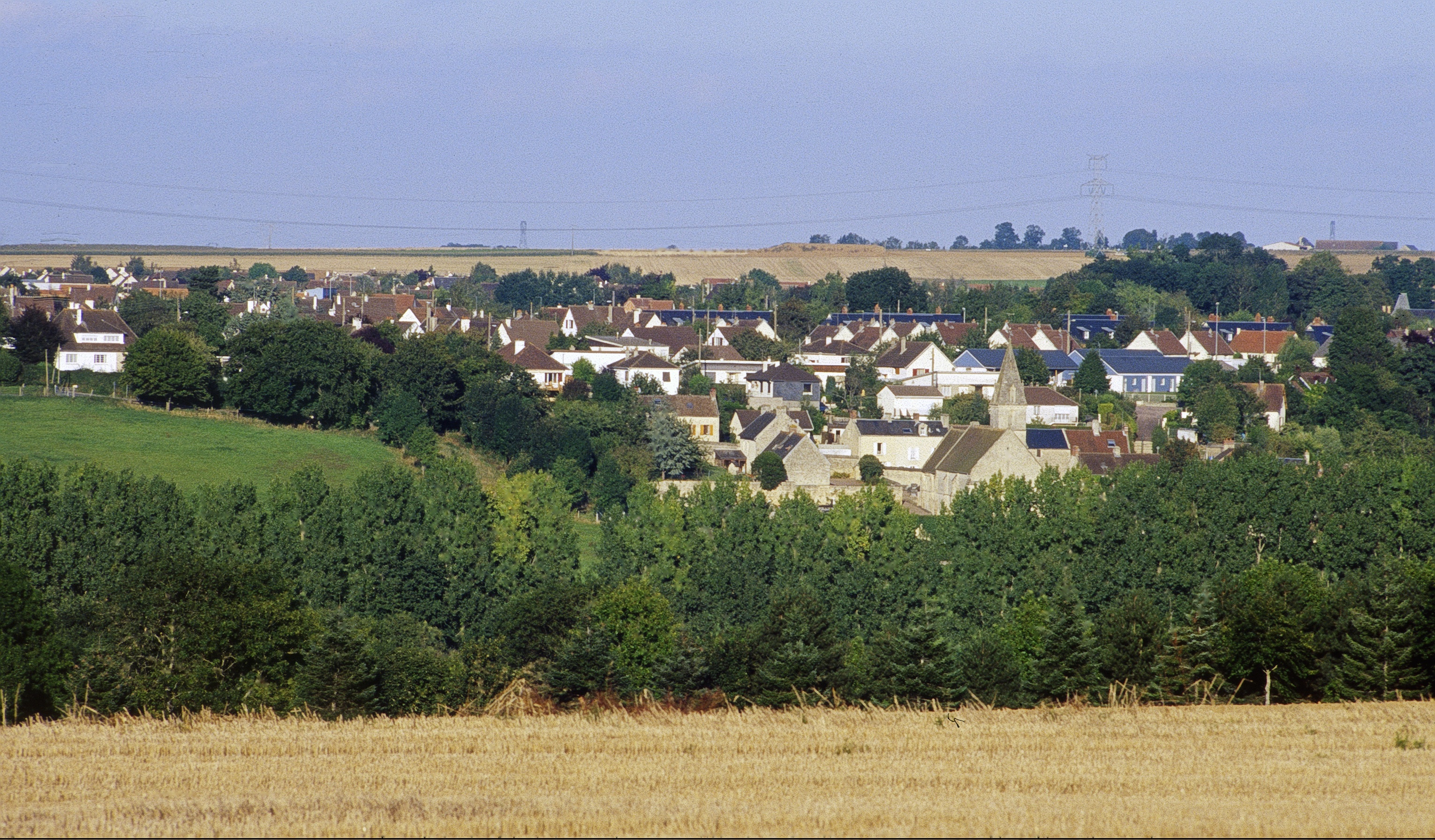
- A general view of Saint-André-sur-Orne
- Location of Saint-André-sur-Orne
- Location within France Location within Normandy
- Coordinates: 49°07′09″N 0°22′55″W
- Country: France
- Region: Normandy
- Department: Calvados
- Arrondissement: Caen
- Canton: Caen-5
- Intercommunality: CU Caen la Mer

Government
  - Mayor (2020–2026): Christian Delbruel
- Area^{1}: 3.68 km^{2} (1.42 sq mi)
- Elevation: 30 m (98 ft)
- Highest elevation: 53 m (174 ft)
- Lowest elevation: 3 m (9.8 ft)
- Population (2023): 1,664
  - Density: 452/km^{2} (1,170/sq mi)
- Time zone: UTC+01:00 (CET)
  - Summer (DST): UTC+02:00 (CEST)
- INSEE/Postal code: 14556 /14320
- ^{1} French Land Register data, which excludes lakes, ponds, glaciers > 1 km^{2} (0.386 sq mi or 247 acres) and river estuaries.

Saint-André-sur-Orne (French pronunciation: [sɛ̃.t‿ɑ̃dʁe syʁ ɔʁn], literally Saint-André on Orne; named Saint-André-de-Fontenay until 1911) is a village in the Calvados department in the Normandy region in northwestern France.

== Geography ==
The commune is made up of the following collection of villages and hamlets, Étavaux and Saint-André-sur-Orne.

The river Orne flows through the commune.

== History ==
The village's history is closely linked to the Saint Stephen abbey "Abbaye Saint-Étienne-de-Fontenay" founded on his land of Fontenay by Raoul Tesson around 1047 under the patronage of Duke William of Normandy (before he became King of England following his victory in Hastings in 1066) and which survived until the French Revolution at the end of the 18th century. Most of the abbey was destroyed at the beginning of the 19th century, but there still remains a 13th-century building along the Orne river, and the abbot's more "modern" house rebuilt at the beginning of the 18th century.

The village witnessed the expulsion of many schoolchildren from the "Maison du Clos" by the Nazi army during World War II, but the marching children were then rescued by Allied soldiers. The village was finally liberated in July 1944 by Canadian soldiers, many of whom died in this fierce battle, hence the street names of "Royal Black Watch" (the Montreal-based regiment) and the village's main street "Rue des Canadiens". Their bodies are buried in the Bretteville-sur-Laize Canadian War Cemetery in the nearby village of Cintheaux.

== Population ==
Historical population
Year	Pop.	±% p.a.
1968	1,044	—
1975	1,156	+1.47%
1982	1,242	+1.03%
1990	1,310	+0.67%
1999	1,606	+2.29%
2007	1,892	+2.07%
2012	1,827	−0.70%
2017	1,831	+0.04%
2023	1,664	−1.58%
Source: INSEE

== Points of Interest ==
=== National heritage sites ===
The commune has three sites listed as a Monument historique.

- Église Saint André - a thirteenth century church registered as a monument in 1937.
- Chapelle Saint Orthaire d'Etavaux - a twelfth century church registered as a monument in 1927.
- Ancienne abbaye Saint-Etienne-de-Fontenay - Former twelfth century Abbey which was registered as a monument in 1945.

== Twin towns – sister cities ==
Saint-André-sur-Orne is twinned with:

- Stockstadt am Main, Germany, since 1993.

== See also ==
- Communes of the Calvados department
