= Périers-sur-le-Dan =

- Commune
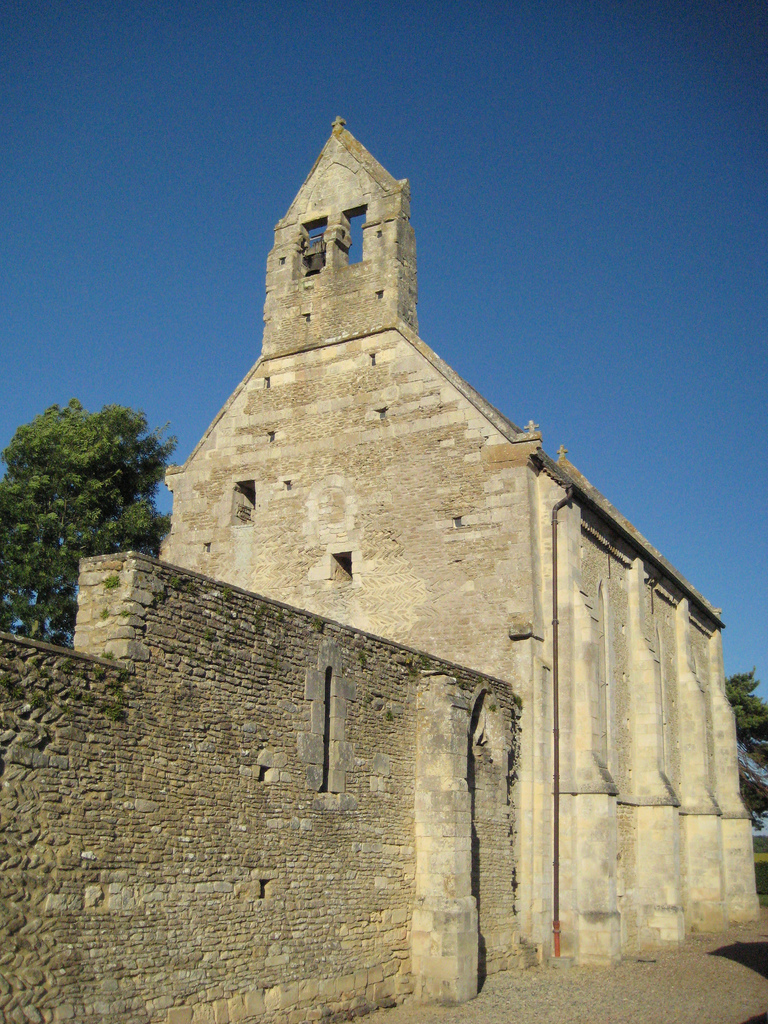
- The church in Périers-sur-le-Dan
- Location of Périers-sur-le-Dan
- Location within France Location within Normandy
- Coordinates: 49°15′32″N 0°20′29″W
- Country: France
- Region: Normandy
- Department: Calvados
- Arrondissement: Caen
- Canton: Ouistreham
- Intercommunality: CU Caen la Mer

Government
  - Mayor (2020–2026): Raymond Picard
- Area^{1}: 2.95 km^{2} (1.14 sq mi)
- Elevation: 26 m (85 ft)
- Highest elevation: 58 m (190 ft)
- Lowest elevation: 18 m (59 ft)
- Population (2023): 587
  - Density: 199/km^{2} (515/sq mi)
- Time zone: UTC+01:00 (CET)
  - Summer (DST): UTC+02:00 (CEST)
- INSEE/Postal code: 14495 /14112
- ^{1} French Land Register data, which excludes lakes, ponds, glaciers > 1 km^{2} (0.386 sq mi or 247 acres) and river estuaries.

Périers-sur-le-Dan (French pronunciation: [peʁje syʁ lə dɑ̃]) is a commune in the Calvados department in the Normandy region in northwestern France.

== Population ==
Historical population
Year	Pop.	±% p.a.
1968	196	—
1975	282	+5.33%
1982	360	+3.55%
1990	491	+3.96%
1999	456	−0.82%
2007	488	+0.85%
2012	503	+0.61%
2017	513	+0.39%
2023	587	+2.27%
Source: INSEE

== See also ==
- Communes of the Calvados department
