= Biéville-Beuville =

- Commune
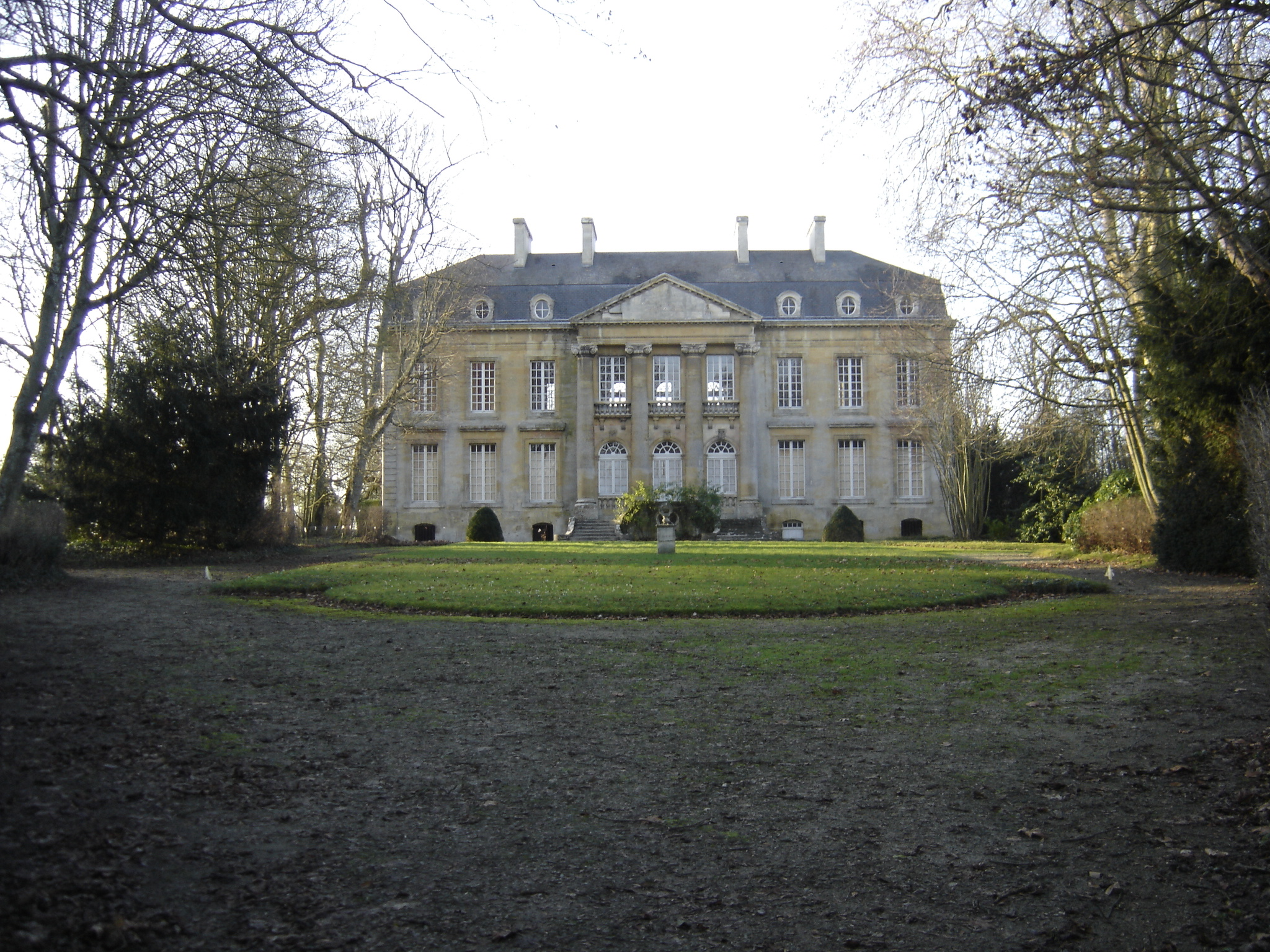
- Chateau of Biéville
- Location of Biéville-Beuville
- Location within France Location within Normandy
- Coordinates: 49°14′11″N 0°19′33″W
- Country: France
- Region: Normandy
- Department: Calvados
- Arrondissement: Caen
- Canton: Ouistreham
- Intercommunality: Caen la Mer

Government
  - Mayor (2020–2026): Christian Chauvois
- Area^{1}: 11.15 km^{2} (4.31 sq mi)
- Elevation: 30 m (98 ft)
- Highest elevation: 58 m (190 ft)
- Lowest elevation: 1 m (3.3 ft)
- Population (2023): 3,840
  - Density: 344/km^{2} (892/sq mi)
- Demonym: Boevillais
- Time zone: UTC+01:00 (CET)
  - Summer (DST): UTC+02:00 (CEST)
- INSEE/Postal code: 14068 /14112
- ^{1} French Land Register data, which excludes lakes, ponds, glaciers > 1 km^{2} (0.386 sq mi or 247 acres) and river estuaries.

Biéville-Beuville (French pronunciation: [bjevil bøvil]) is a commune in the Calvados department in the Normandy region in northwestern France. The hyphenated name originates from the former communes of Biéville-sur-Orne and Beuville, which were united in 1972.

== Toponymy ==
The name Biéville is believed to come from the Old German name Boio or Boia combined with the Old French ville, meaning farm. Biéville was recorded as Boiavilla in 1082. Residents (of the combined town) are still known as Boevillais.

Similarly, Beuville is believed to come from the Old German name Bodo. It was recorded as Bodvilla in 1134.

Norman settlers from the area in Scotland and England carried surnames such as de Bouvelles, de Bovelles, de Boyuille and de Boyuill, and are believed to be the origin of the common surnames Boyle and Bowles.

== History ==
Until the middle of the 16th century, the seignory of Beuville remained in the hands of the de Beuville family. In 1770, it fell to the Lecocq family; Louis Lecocq was the last lord of Beuville before the French Revolution overthrew the nobility.

The lordship of Bieville was a fiefferme (a fiefdom owned by the crown but leased to a local lord). The lords of Biéville were less powerful than the lords of other seignories such as Beuville, as their lands were not centralized. The lords of Biéville operated several other significant estates, including Rubercy, la Vallée, Balleroy, and la Londe.

During the Second World War, the British fought the Germans for more than a month nearby. The two parishes were united to form one commune in 1972.

== Population ==
The population data before 1972 refer to the sum of the populations of the former communes Beuville and Biéville-sur-Orne.

Historical population

Year	Pop.	±% p.a.
1793	799	—
1800	811	+0.21%
1806	853	+0.85%
1821	857	+0.03%
1831	857	+0.00%
1836	827	−0.71%
1841	851	+0.57%
1846	883	+0.74%
1851	884	+0.02%
1856	879	−0.11%
1861	875	−0.09%
1866	797	−1.85%
1872	781	−0.34%
1876	779	−0.06%
1881	715	−1.70%
1886	639	−2.22%
1891	657	+0.56%
1896	568	−2.87%
1901	567	−0.04%

Year	Pop.	±% p.a.
1906	562	−0.18%
1911	553	−0.32%
1921	586	+0.58%
1926	579	−0.24%
1931	571	−0.28%
1936	578	+0.24%
1946	639	+1.01%
1954	713	+1.38%
1962	810	+1.61%
1968	1,117	+5.50%
1975	1,321	+2.43%
1982	1,606	+2.83%
1990	2,223	+4.15%
1999	2,191	−0.16%
2007	2,516	+1.74%
2012	2,548	+0.25%
2017	3,391	+5.88%
2023	3,840	+2.09%

Source: EHESS and INSEE (1975-2023)

== See also ==
- Communes of the Calvados department
