= Buk, Greater Poland Voivodeship =

Buk
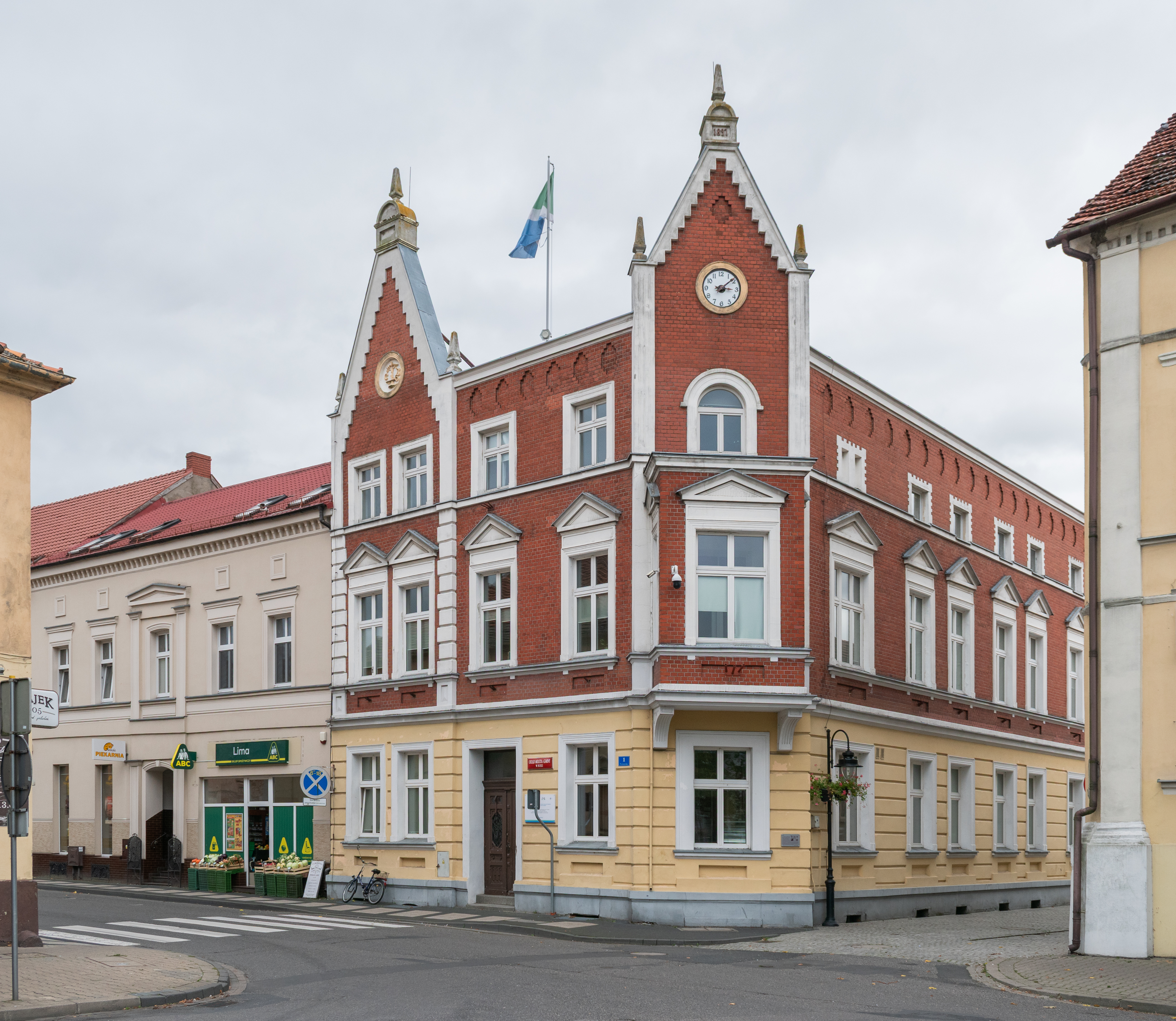
- Town hall

- Flag Coat of arms

- Location within Poland
- Coordinates: 52°21′N 16°31′E
- Country: Poland
- Voivodeship: Greater Poland
- County: Poznań
- Gmina: Buk
- Town rights: 1289

Government
  - Mayor: Paweł Adam

Area
  - Total: 2.96 km^{2} (1.14 sq mi)

Population (31 December 2021)
  - Total: 5,903
  - Density: 1,990/km^{2} (5,170/sq mi)
- Time zone: UTC+1 (CET)
  - Summer (DST): UTC+2 (CEST)
- Postal code: 64-320
- Area code: +48 61
- Vehicle registration: PZ, POZ
- Primary airport: Poznań–Ławica Airport
- Website: www.buk.gmina.pl

Buk [buk] is a town in Poznań County, in the Greater Poland Voivodeship, in western Poland. As of December 2021, the town has a population of 5,903.

== Etymology ==
The town's name means "Beech" in Polish, and the flag of the town shows a branch of beech, and three beech leaves. According to legend, Mieszko I, the first Christian ruler of Poland, died under a beech tree near the town.

== History ==
Buk was granted town rights in 1289. It was a private church town, administratively located in the Poznań County in the Poznań Voivodeship in the Greater Poland Province of the Kingdom of Poland.

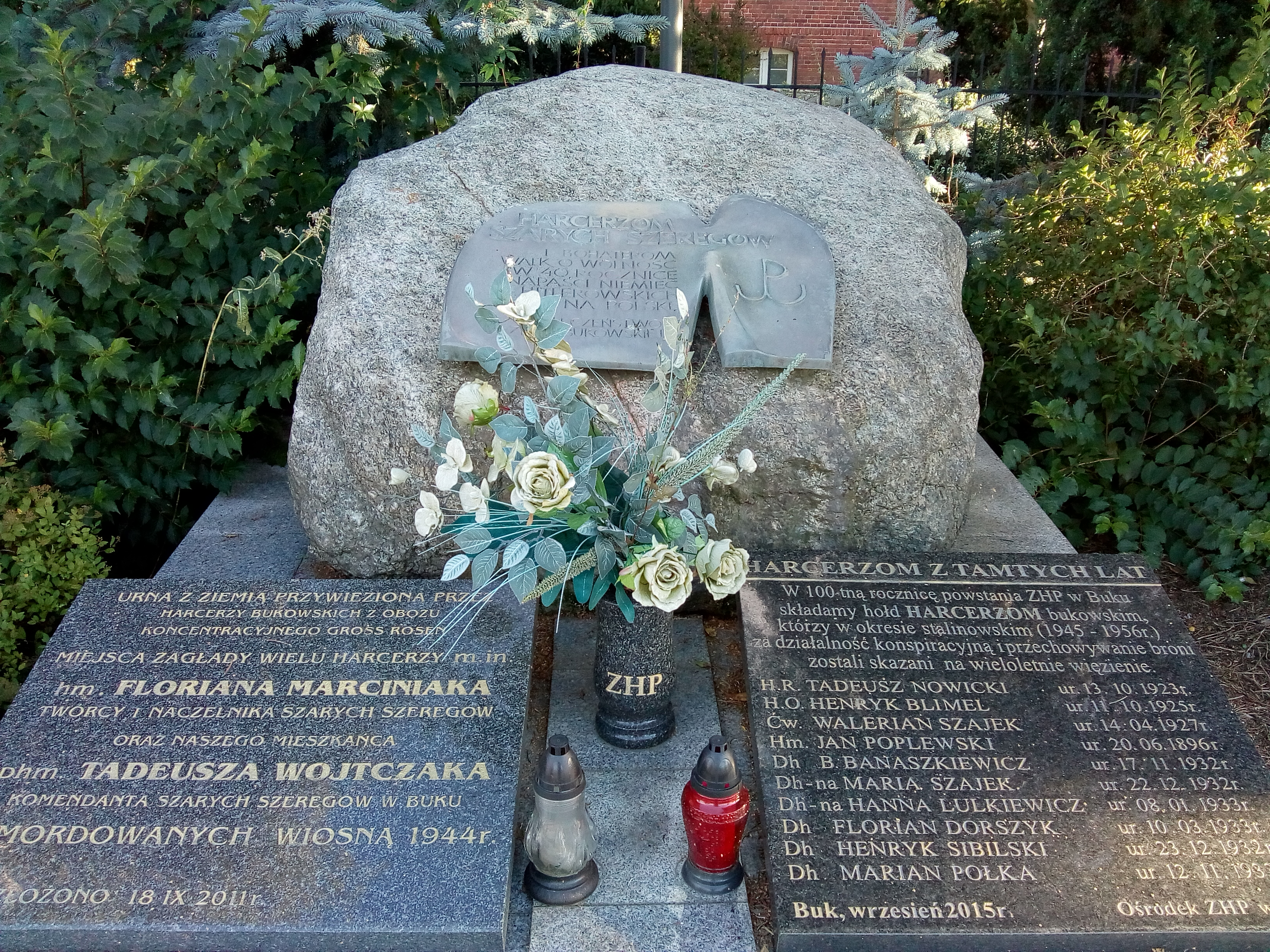
Grey Ranks memorial

Following the joint German-Soviet invasion of Poland, which started World War II in September 1939, Buk was occupied by Germany until 1945. On 10 October 1939, the Germans executed Polish parliamentarian Franciszek Górczak in Buk (see Nazi crimes against the Polish nation). In 1940, the occupiers carried out expulsions of Poles, who were deported to a transit camp in Łódź, while their houses and workshops were handed over to German colonists as part of the Lebensraum policy. The Polish resistance was active in Buk. The Grey Ranks printed Polish underground press, conducted intelligence, organized secret Polish schooling and secret film screenings for young people, etc. In 1943, the Germans renamed the town to Buchenstadt in attempt to erase traces of Polish origin. Tadeusz Wojtczak, founder of the local units of the Grey Ranks, was arrested by the Germans in August 1943, and following a brutal investigation he was imprisoned in the infamous Fort VII in Poznań and eventually killed in the Gross-Rosen concentration camp. In January 1945, a German-perpetrated death march of prisoners of various nationalities from the dissolved camp in Żabikowo to the Sachsenhausen concentration camp passed through Buk. In 1945, Polish partisans clashed with the Wehrmacht rear security near Buk. After the war, Buk was restored to Poland, although with a Soviet-installed communist regime, which stayed in power until the Fall of Communism in the 1980s. Some members of the Polish resistance movement were persecuted by the communists after the war. In 1947, the communists arrested Henryk Blimel, leader of the local Lisy unit of the Grey Ranks, and sentenced him to 12 years in prison.

From 1945 to 1998, Buk was administratively part of the Poznań Voivodeship.

== Demographics ==
Historical population

Year	Pop.	±%
1871	2,670	—
1880	2,885	+8.1%
1890	3,348	+16.0%
1900	3,547	+5.9%
1910	3,737	+5.4%
1921	3,480	−6.9%

Year	Pop.	±%
1931	3,637	+4.5%
1939	3,586	−1.4%
1950	3,475	−3.1%
1960	3,989	+14.8%
2010	6,089	+52.6%

== Transport ==
The Polish Voivodeship roads 306 and 307 pass through the town, and the A2 motorway runs nearby, north of the town. There is also a train station in Buk.

== Major corporations ==
- Wavin Metalplast-Buk sp. z o.o, Buk

== Twin towns – sister cities ==
Buk is twinned with:

- Verson, France
- Tourville-sur-Odon, France
