= Ouistreham =

- Commune
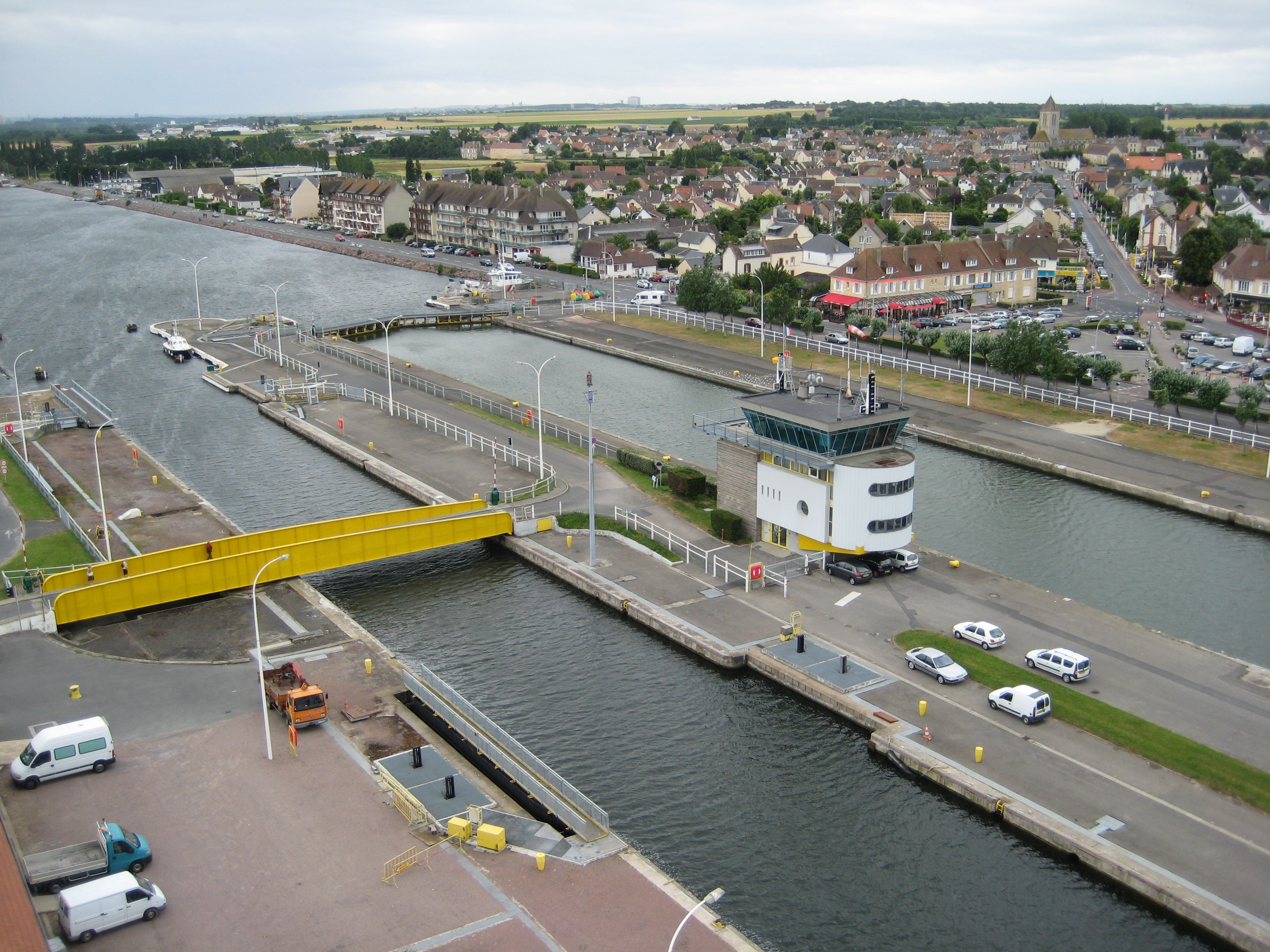
- Ouistreham locks

- Coat of arms
- Location of Ouistreham
- Location within France Location within Normandy
- Coordinates: 49°17′N 0°16′W
- Country: France
- Region: Normandy
- Department: Calvados
- Arrondissement: Caen
- Canton: Ouistreham
- Intercommunality: CU Caen la Mer

Government
  - Mayor (2020–2026): Romain Bail
- Area^{1}: 9.95 km^{2} (3.84 sq mi)
- Elevation: 12 m (39 ft)
- Population (2023): 9,212
  - Density: 926/km^{2} (2,400/sq mi)
- Time zone: UTC+01:00 (CET)
  - Summer (DST): UTC+02:00 (CEST)
- INSEE/Postal code: 14488 /14150
- Website: ouistreham-rivabella.fr
- ^{1} French Land Register data, which excludes lakes, ponds, glaciers > 1 km^{2} (0.386 sq mi or 247 acres) and river estuaries.

Ouistreham (French pronunciation: [wistʁe.am]) is a port town and commune in the Calvados department in Normandy region in northwestern France.

Ouistreham is a port with both Cargo ships and a harbour for ferries to and from England. It serves as the entry point of the Caen canal which leads to the city of Caen. Due to this, the town serves as a logistics centre.

== Etymology ==
The name Ouistreham derives from Saxon ham, meaning 'village'. There is no clear explanation for the first part of the name. A popular etymology is based on Middle French ouistre (Old French oystre), meaning 'oyster'. Most linguists agree on a Saxon origin, meaning Western or West (though some other linguists have claimed that it derives from the Saxon word meaning Eastern), because of the presence of Saxon-speaking settlers from England in Viking Normandy. Following this theory, 'Ouistreham' is a calque of 'Westerham' in Kent.

== History ==
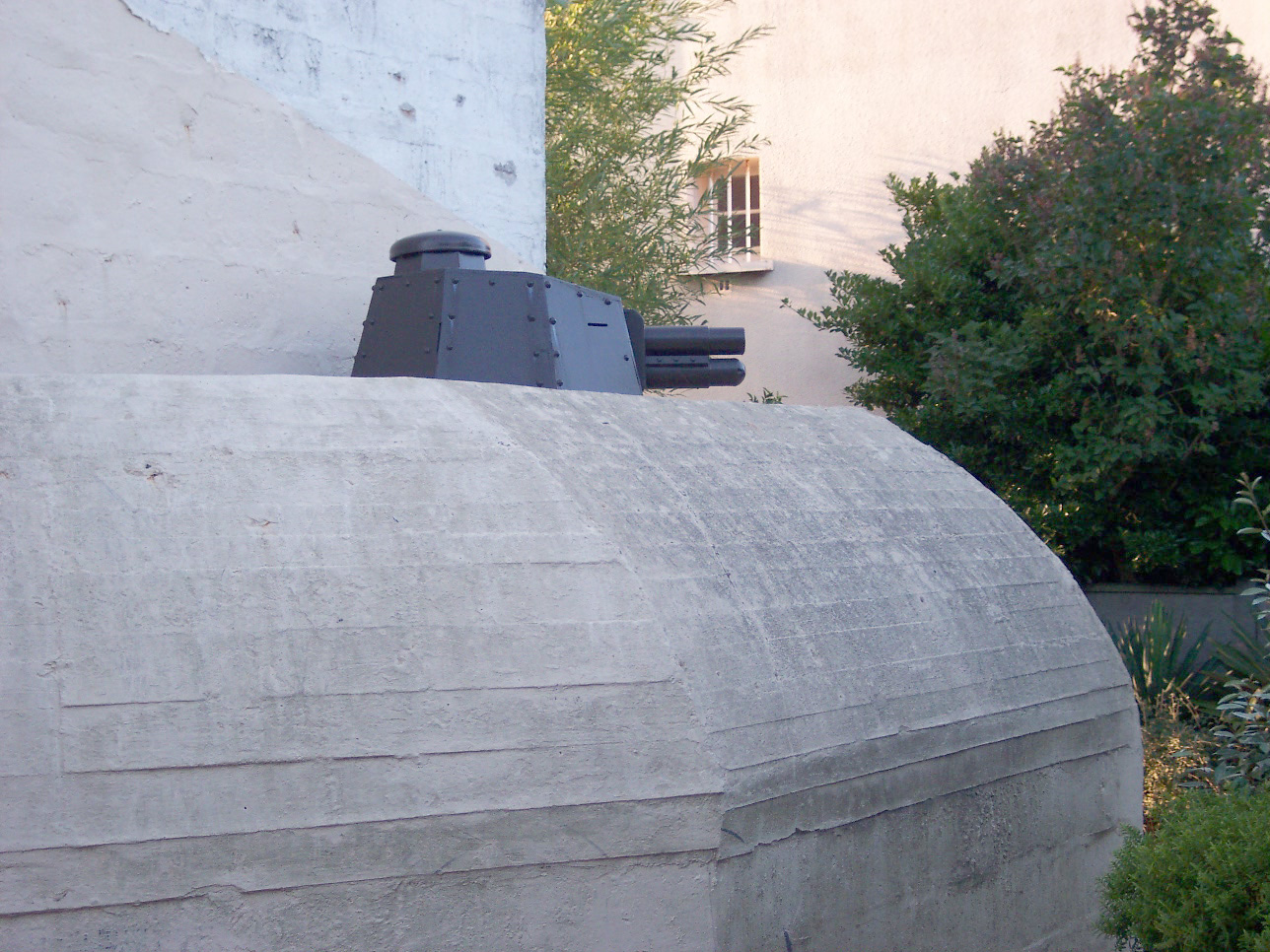
German bunker in Ouistreham, fitted with the turret of a Renault FT tank.

Ouistreham has been a trading port since the Middle Ages. The harbour is now a part of "Port de Caen-Ouistreham". Since the beginning of the 20th century, it has been a bathing beach on the "Riva Bella".

On 6 June 1944, No. 4 Commando landed at Ouistreham (codenamed Sword) and fought their way to Pegasus Bridge, with the 177 Free French of the No. 10 (Inter-Allied) Commando given the honour of spearheading the advance. The assault on Ouistreham was featured in the movie The Longest Day, although the film location for Ouistreham was at the nearby village of Port-en-Bessin.

A "Roman camp" (Catillon or Castillon) was located on the left bank of the Orne near Bénouville. It has been leveled, only a small part of the northwest rampart remains. In reality, modern archeology excludes the hypothesis that it is a Roman camp, at least not from the High Empire, archaeologists having never unveiled a Roman camp dating from this period in the North from Gaul, apart from Arlaines at Ressons-le-Long (Aisne), and probably not from the Lower Empire either. The expression Roman Camp or Caesar's Camp generally applies to works dating from the Iron Age or the Middle Ages.

The Saint-Samson church and the tithe barn make from the border of the town of Ouistreham the heart of this city. Its proximity to the sea meant that the town developed towards the shore, to the north. Ouistreham was a village of fishermen and farmers where the activity was also linked to maritime trade. Ouistreham experienced the development of its port thanks to the extraction and export of Caen and Ranville stone. There are still some typical fishermen's houses in this town.

In 1779, to protect the shore of the Orne from English attacks, it was decided to build three redoubts according to Vauban's plans, at Ouistreham, Colleville and Merville. These redoubts were disarmed in 1816, that of Ouistreham was sold to a private individual who transformed it into a mansion. Remains of the redoubt are still visible at the "Petit Château de la Redoute" at 38 boulevard Boivin-Champeaux.

In 1866, a first villa was built near the beach. Its owner, Mr. Longpré, manufacturer of corsets in Caen, gave it the name of Belle Rive. A painter who had noticed that the sunsets on the shores of Ouistreham resembled those he had had the opportunity to admire in Italy, de Belle Rive made it Riva Bella. Little by little the dunes and swamps disappear to give way to villas and the first casino is built.

At the very beginning of the 20th century, the seaside resort developed around these luxurious villas and leisure facilities: thalassotherapy and the Ouistreham casino. On 15 August 1891 the société anonyme des Établissements Decauville Aîné provisionally opened a narrow-gauge railway of local interest (60 cm) between Ouistreham and Luc-sur-Mer. This line, extended in 1891–1892 to Dives-sur-Mer and Caen, was taken over in 1894 by the Société anonyme des Chemins de fer du Calvados. It will remain for a long time the most profitable line of the Calvados Railways network. While the other lines were closed one after the other in the 1930s, the Luc - Ouistreham - Caen line was retained. Damaged during the landing, it closed in 1944.

During the Second World War, Ouistreham was occupied by German troops. From 1942, the beach area became a no man's land; 123 villas by the sea were demolished to make way for the defenses of the Atlantic Wall: 80 concrete structures and an artillery observation post overlooking the beach "the big bunker" were built. On 6 June 1944 this surveillance post became a strategic place and its capture ensured the landing point on the beach of Sword Beach. Commander Philippe Kieffer's No. 4 commando comprising the 177 French marines (forming an integral part of Lord Lovat's first special brigade) then reached the bridges of Bénouville (Pegasus Bridge) and Ranville and thus operated the junction with the paratroopers of the 6th DAP (British Airborne) after street fighting in Ouistreham.

On 6 June 2014 Ouistreham hosted the international ceremony for the 70th anniversary of the Normandy landings and battle (5 million viewers in France alone; 1.2 billion worldwide). There were 1,800 veterans, 19 heads of state and 8,000 guests of honor and people from Ouistreham in the stands.

== In literature ==
Georges Simenon set a Maigret story in Ouistreham entitled "Le port des brumes" or "The Misty Harbour" in English. Published first in 1932, Simenon - who had a deep interest in canals and waterways - evoked the nature and atmosphere of the port at that time.

== Population ==
Historical population

Year	Pop.	±% p.a.
1793	854	—
1800	796	−1.00%
1806	1,050	+4.72%
1821	1,104	+0.33%
1831	1,162	+0.51%
1836	1,149	−0.22%
1841	1,359	+3.41%
1846	1,194	−2.56%
1851	1,133	−1.04%
1856	1,221	+1.51%
1861	1,259	+0.61%
1866	1,243	−0.26%
1872	1,249	+0.08%
1876	1,196	−1.08%
1881	1,222	+0.43%
1886	1,206	−0.26%
1891	1,194	−0.20%
1896	1,354	+2.55%
1901	1,688	+4.51%

Year	Pop.	±% p.a.
1906	1,523	−2.04%
1911	1,574	+0.66%
1921	2,013	+2.49%
1926	2,220	+1.98%
1931	2,584	+3.08%
1936	2,790	+1.55%
1946	3,527	+2.37%
1954	4,342	+2.63%
1962	4,780	+1.21%
1968	5,223	+1.49%
1975	6,140	+2.34%
1982	6,310	+0.39%
1990	6,709	+0.77%
1999	8,679	+2.90%
2007	9,248	+0.80%
2012	9,452	+0.44%
2017	9,081	−0.80%
2023	9,212	+0.24%

Source: EHESS and INSEE (1968–2023)

== Transportation ==
The port of Ouistreham has a scheduled cross-Channel ferry service to Portsmouth, operated by Brittany Ferries. During 2017, Ouistreham became a new focal point for migrants and refugees trying to cross the Channel, leading the British government to contribute to improved security there.

== Sport ==
The Commune has a football team AJS Colleville-Ouistreham who play at the Stade Philippe Kieffer.

== International relations ==
Ouistreham is twinned with:

- (United Kingdom) Angmering in England (since 1976)
- Braine-l'Alleud in Belgium
- Lohr am Main in Germany

== See also ==
- Communes of the Calvados department
