= Cuverville, Calvados =

Cuverville
- Commune
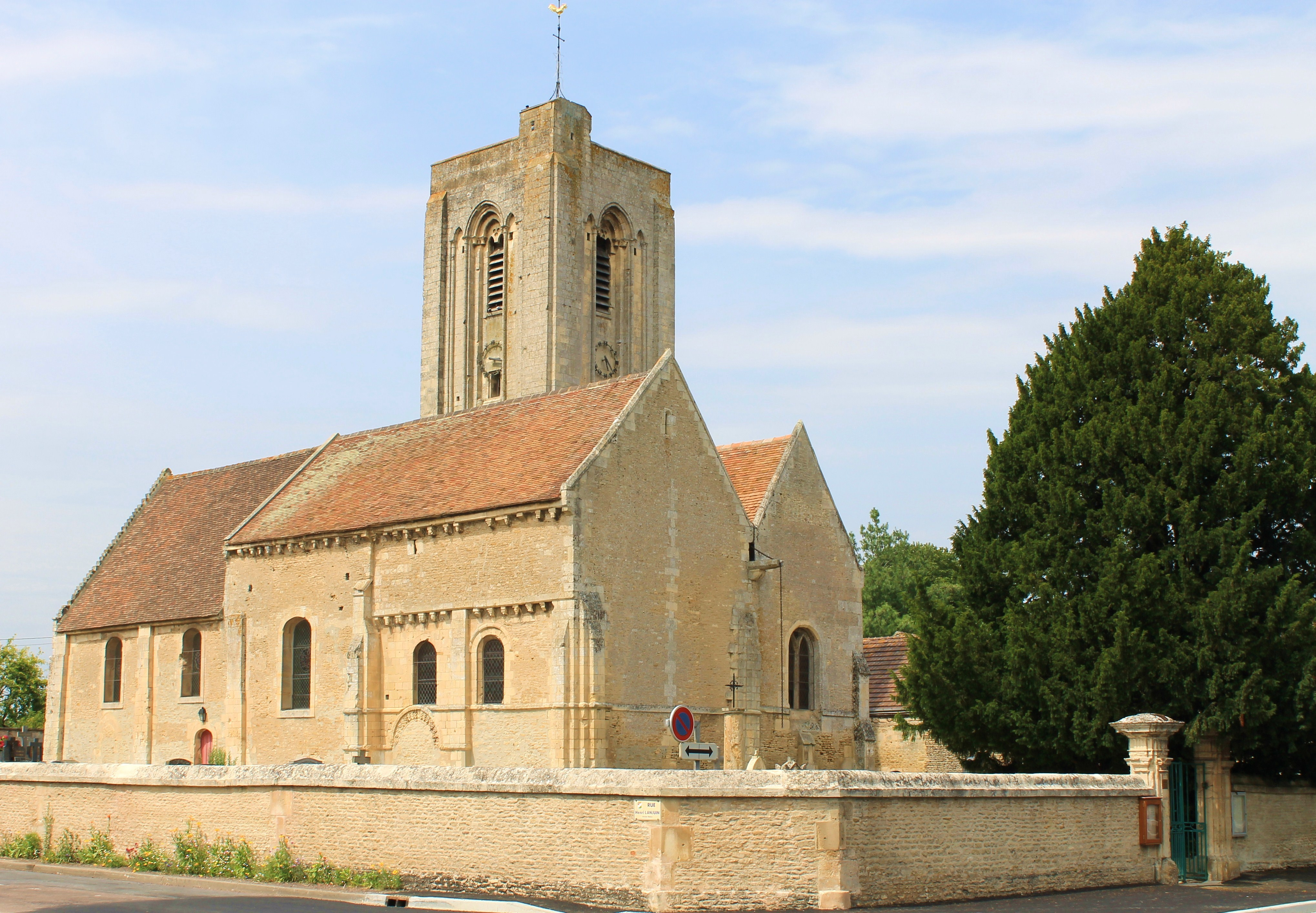
- The church in Cuverville

- Coat of arms
- Location of Cuverville
- Location within France Location within Normandy
- Coordinates: 49°11′26″N 0°15′45″W
- Country: France
- Region: Normandy
- Department: Calvados
- Arrondissement: Caen
- Canton: Troarn
- Intercommunality: CU Caen la Mer

Government
  - Mayor (2020–2026): Catherine Aubert
- Area^{1}: 2.01 km^{2} (0.78 sq mi)
- Elevation: 27 m (89 ft)
- Highest elevation: 32 m (105 ft)
- Lowest elevation: 16 m (52 ft)
- Population (2023): 2,267
  - Density: 1,130/km^{2} (2,920/sq mi)
- Time zone: UTC+01:00 (CET)
  - Summer (DST): UTC+02:00 (CEST)
- INSEE/Postal code: 14215 /14840
- ^{1} French Land Register data, which excludes lakes, ponds, glaciers > 1 km^{2} (0.386 sq mi or 247 acres) and river estuaries.

Cuverville (French pronunciation: [kyvɛʁvil]) is a commune in the Calvados department in the Normandy region in northwestern France.

== Population ==
Historical population
Year	Pop.	±% p.a.
1968	441	—
1975	517	+2.30%
1982	1,044	+10.56%
1990	1,314	+2.92%
1999	1,779	+3.42%
2007	2,031	+1.67%
2012	2,044	+0.13%
2017	2,130	+0.83%
2023	2,267	+1.04%
Source: INSEE

== See also ==
- Communes of the Calvados department
