= Canton of Ouistreham =

Coordinates: 49.28°N 0.26°W

Ouistreham
- Canton
- Interactive map of Ouistreham
- Country: France
- Region: Normandy
- Department: Calvados
- No. of communes: {{{nbcomm}}}

Government
  - Representatives (2021–2028): Michel Fricout; Christine Even
- Area: 72.93 km^{2} (28.16 sq mi)
- Population (2023): 35,406
  - Density: 485.5/km^{2} (1,257/sq mi)
- INSEE code: 14 20

The canton of Ouistreham is an administrative division of the Calvados department, northwestern France. Its borders were modified at the French canton reorganisation which came into effect in March 2015. Its seat is in Ouistreham.

== Composition ==
It consists of the following communes:

1. Bénouville
2. Biéville-Beuville
3. Blainville-sur-Orne
4. Cambes-en-Plaine
5. Colleville-Montgomery
6. Hermanville-sur-Mer
7. Lion-sur-Mer
8. Mathieu
9. Ouistreham
10. Périers-sur-le-Dan
11. Saint-Aubin-d'Arquenay

== Councillors ==
Election	Councillors	Party	Occupation
2015	Michel Fricout	LR	Councillor of Ouistreham
2015	Claire Trouvé	LR	Former Councillor of Caen

== Pictures of the canton ==
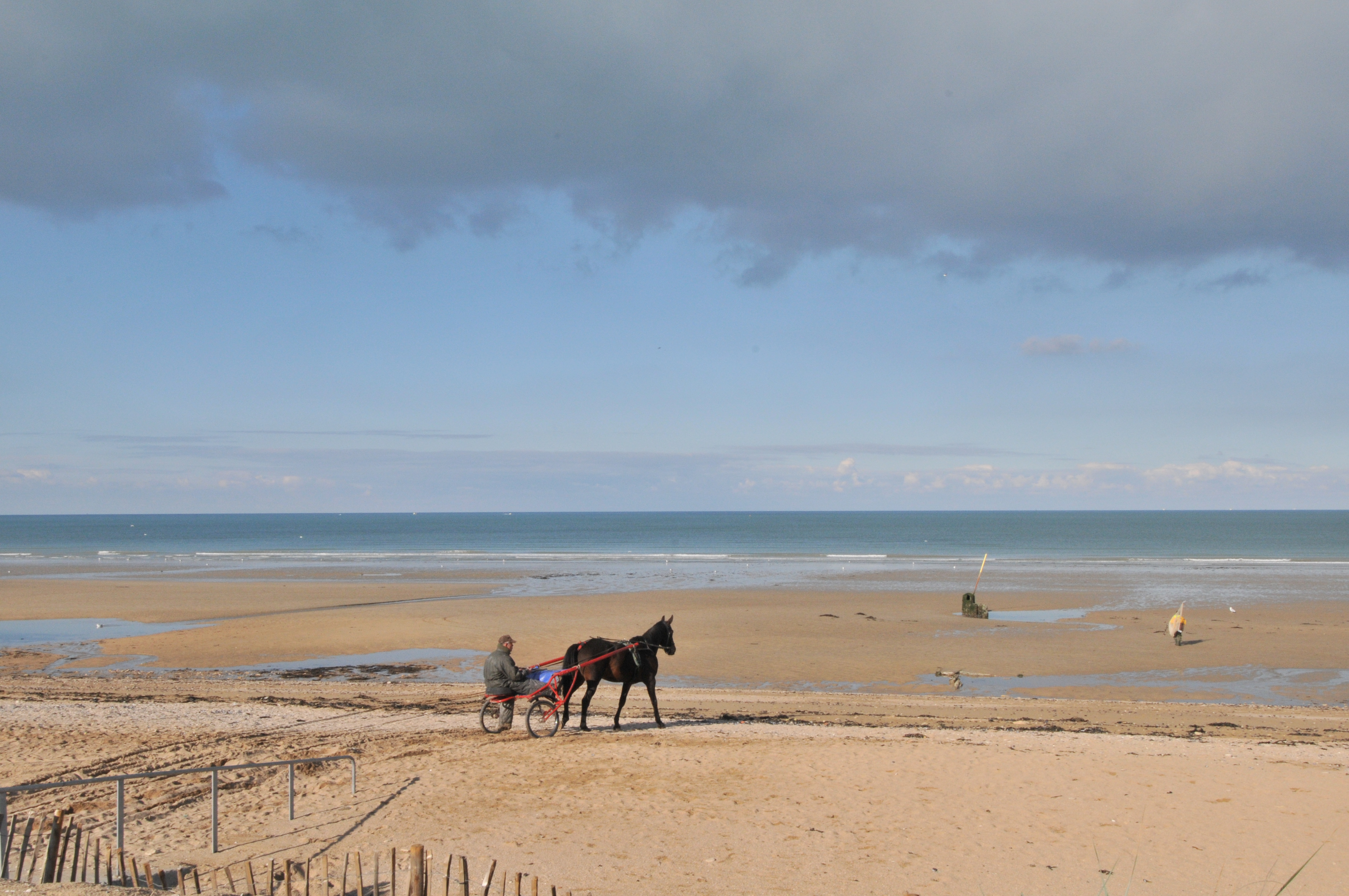
Hermanville-sur-Mer beach

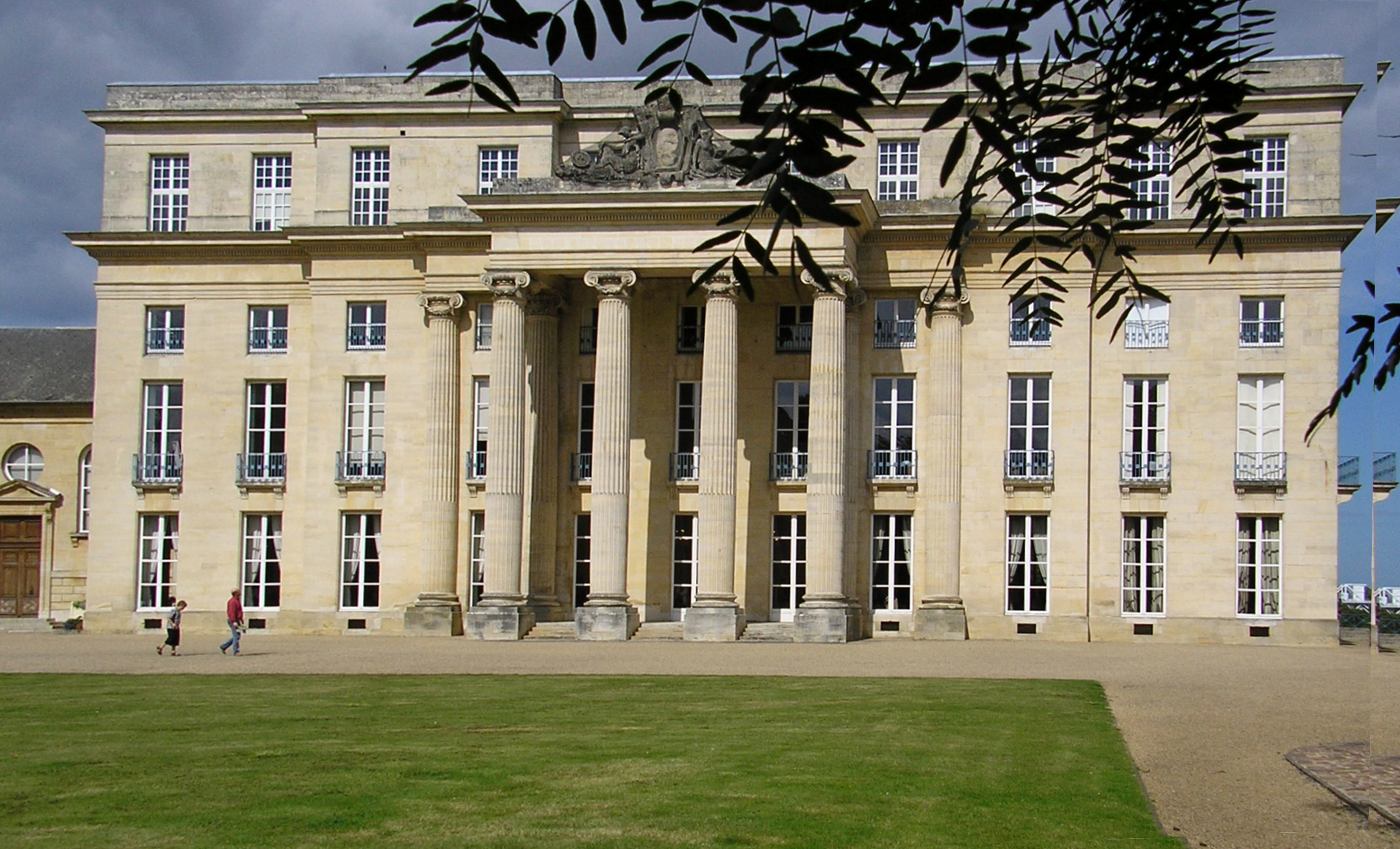
Château de Bénouville

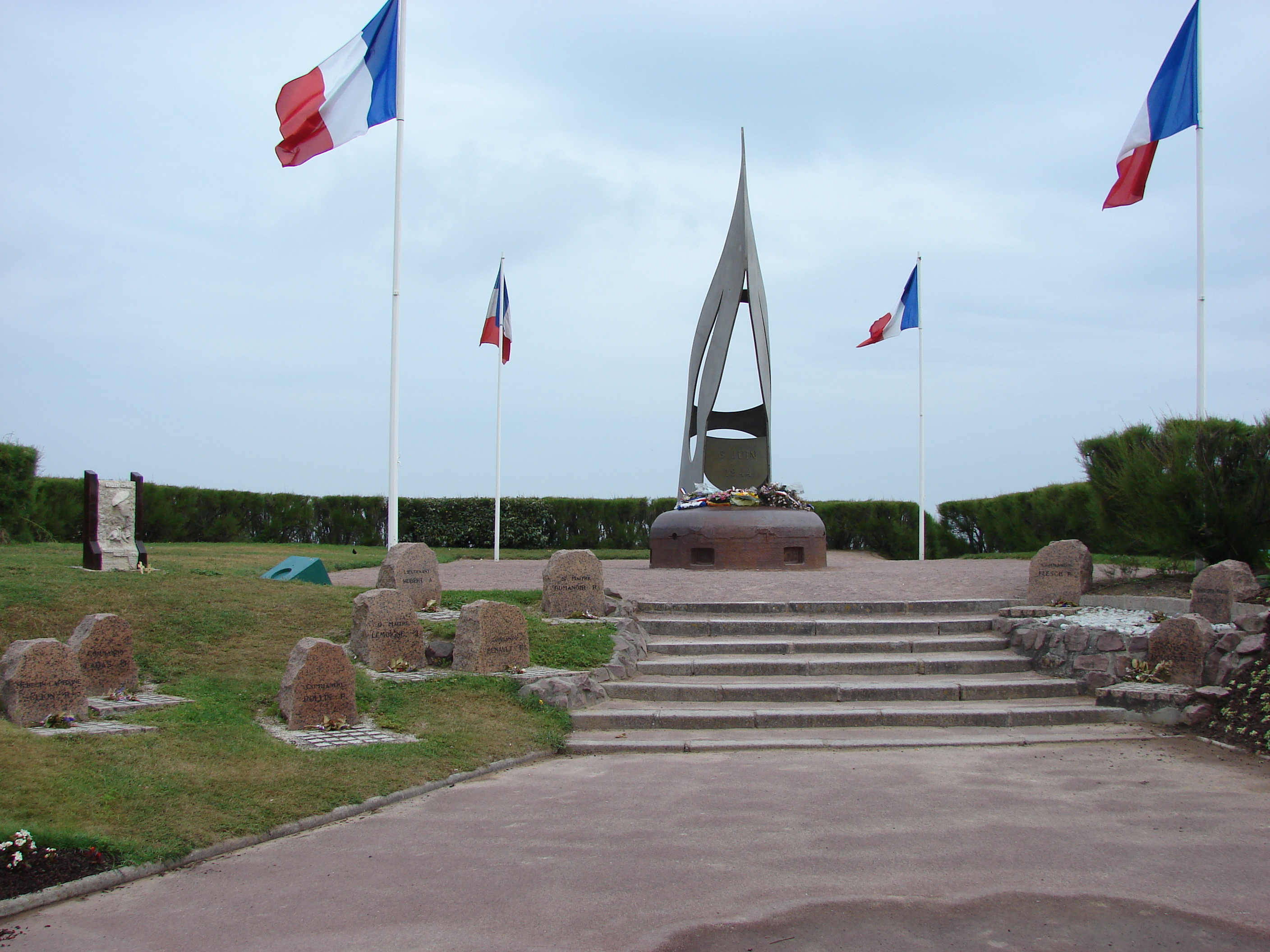
Monument Français Libres - Monument Kieffer in Ouistreham
