= Bénouville, Calvados =

Bénouville
- Commune
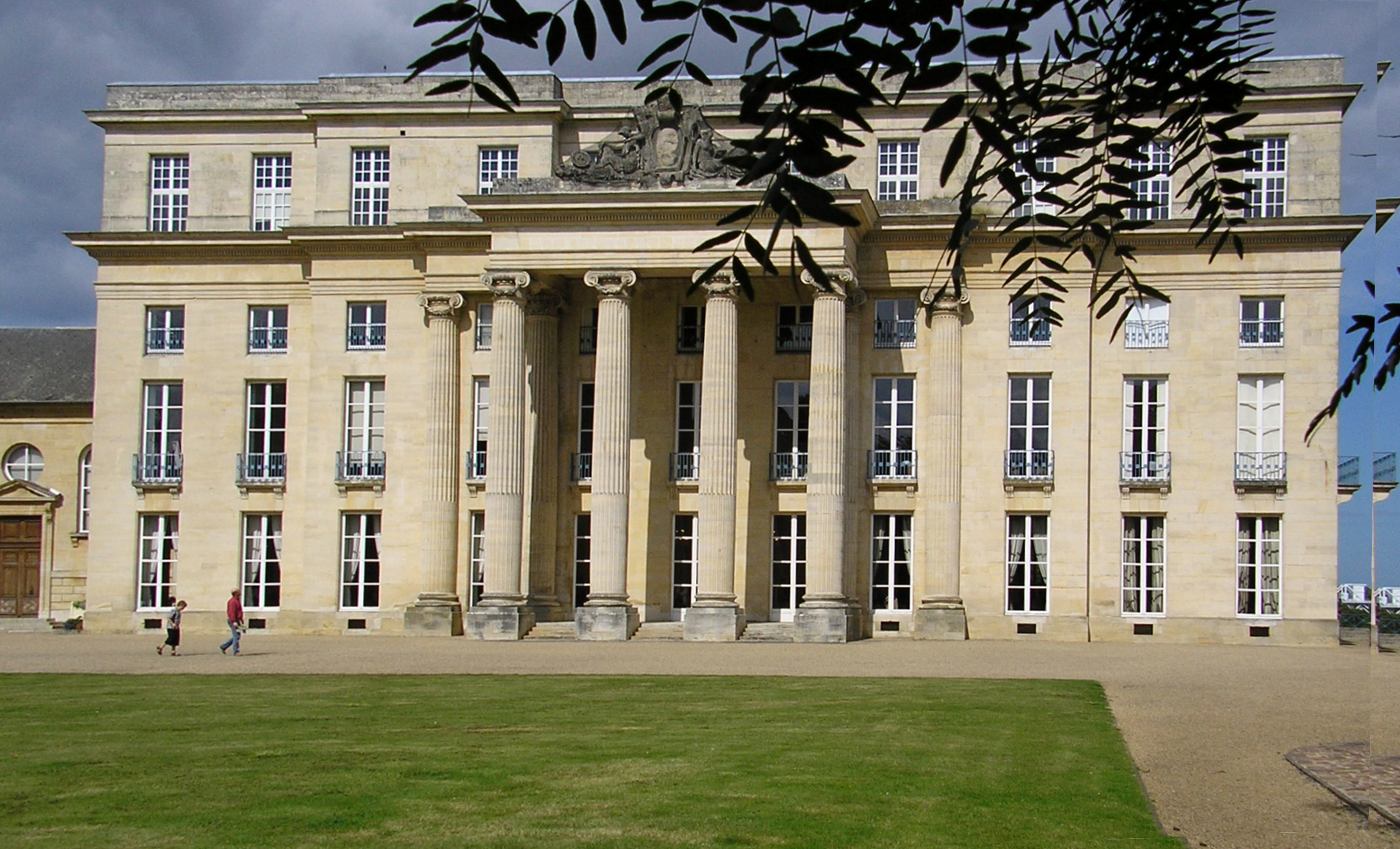
- Chateau of Bénouville

- Coat of arms
- Location of Bénouville
- Location within France Location within Normandy
- Coordinates: 49°14′30″N 0°16′43″W
- Country: France
- Region: Normandy
- Department: Calvados
- Arrondissement: Caen
- Canton: Ouistreham
- Intercommunality: Caen la Mer

Government
  - Mayor (2020–2026): Clémentine Le Marrec
- Area^{1}: 5.28 km^{2} (2.04 sq mi)
- Elevation: 30 m (98 ft)
- Highest elevation: 50 m (160 ft)
- Lowest elevation: 1 m (3.3 ft)
- Population (2023): 1,987
  - Density: 376/km^{2} (975/sq mi)
- Time zone: UTC+01:00 (CET)
  - Summer (DST): UTC+02:00 (CEST)
- INSEE/Postal code: 14060 /14970
- ^{1} French Land Register data, which excludes lakes, ponds, glaciers > 1 km^{2} (0.386 sq mi or 247 acres) and river estuaries.

Bénouville (French pronunciation: [benuvil]) is a commune in the Calvados department in the Normandy region in northwestern France.

It is located on the Canal de Caen à la Mer close to Caen and Ouistreham.

== Sights ==
- Château de Bénouville completed in 1777 by Claude Nicolas Ledoux
- Pegasus Bridge
- Memorial Pegasus

== D-Day and Pegasus Bridge ==
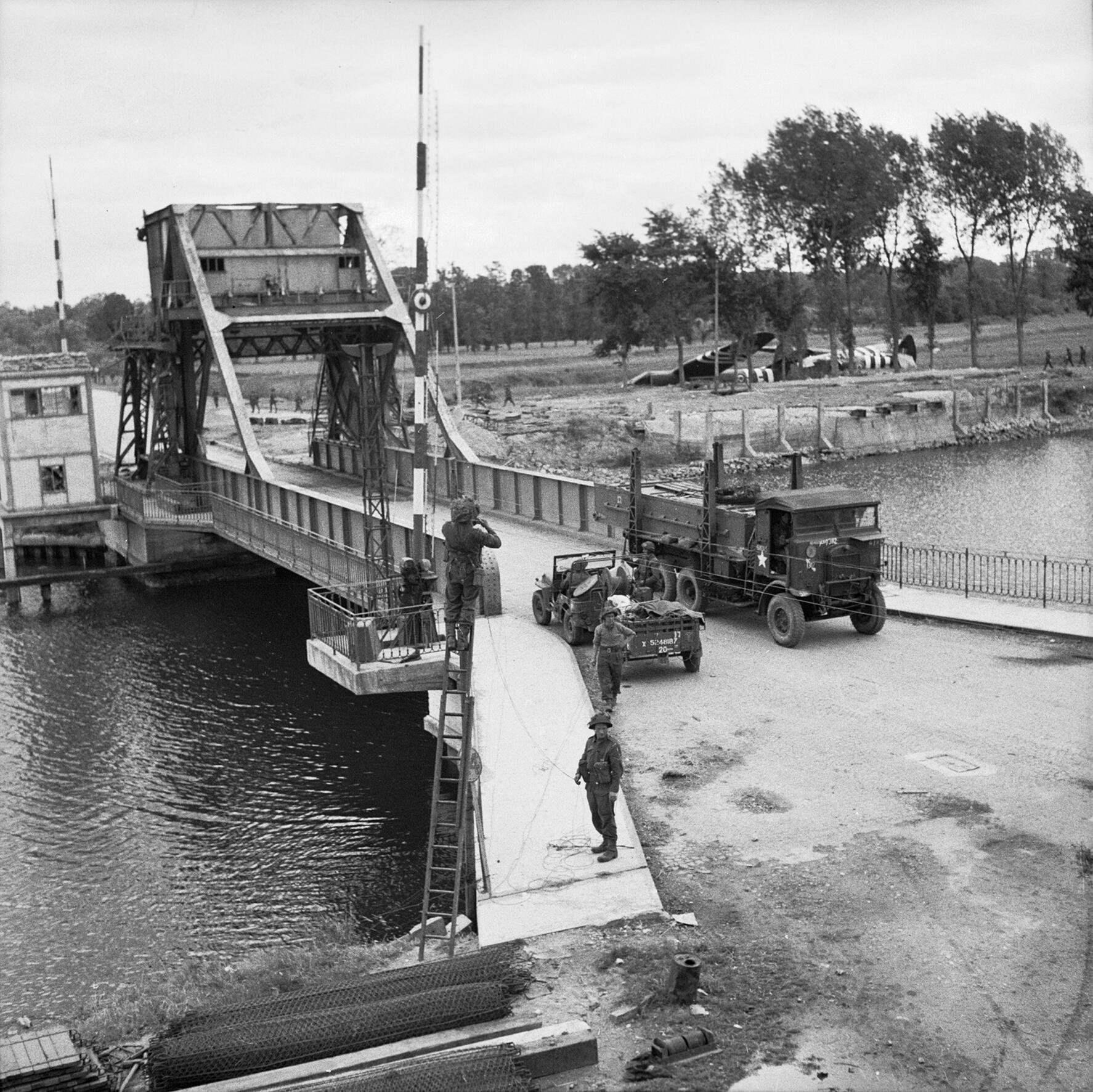
Pegasus Bridge in 1944

Bénouville was the scene of the first – and possibly most vital – battle of the Allied invasion of Europe on D-Day, 6 June 1944 and the night before. From 12.15 am (British Double Summertime = 5 June at 23:15 hrs. German/Middle-European time), a reinforced company of glider-borne troops from the 2nd Batt. Oxfordshire and Buckinghamshire Light Infantry, led by Major Reginald John Howard, landed around the bridge over the Caen Canal at Bénouville in three Horsa gliders and captured it from the Germans in a swift and dramatic attack. Control of this bridge was vital to the success of the whole Operation Overlord invasion, because it would be the route of any German counter-attack eventually with their "Panzers" against the seaborne forces which were due to start landing a few hours later on Sword.

At the same time, another Oxfordshire and Buckinghamshire glider-borne force of sixty men (one glider was wrongly released near Varaville at the Dives River) captured the neighbouring bridge over the River Orne – about a quarter of a mile away near Ranville – which was also of vital strategic importance. The Caen Canal bridge was later renamed Pegasus Bridge by Royal Engineers, in honour of the winged horse symbol of the Airborne Forces, while the River Orne bridge was many years later renamed Horsa Bridge, after the type of glider which carried the men to war.

Today, Pegasus Bridge and the nearby Café Gondrée are the scene of many pilgrimages and commemoration ceremonies, particularly around 6 June. Its wartime inhabitants were members of a local resistance group and passed the information on the canal bridge to a cell in Caen and from there to England. A few hundred yards across Pegasus Bridge lies the modern Musée Mémorial Pegasus. As for the Café Gondrée, on D-Day itself, Monsieur and Mme Gondrée who lived in the café were woken up by the landing of the gliders. Monsieur Gondrée looked out of a window and saw black "masked" troops running over the bridge, which he later learned were British paratroopers. In celebration, he also dug up some 99 bottles of champagne which he had hidden in the garden and in the morning of 6 June toasted his liberation with some of the men from the gliders.

The Gondrées had three daughters and one of them, Arlette, took over the café from her parents and maintained it as a memorial to the men who landed on 6 June 1944. (Her picture is in the Holt's Normandy Battlefield Guide Book published by Pen and Sword). To this day, it also remains a working café. For many years after the war Major John Howard could be found in the café for the 6 June anniversary and even today many veterans and current members of the Airborne Forces still visit Gondrée Café or one of the other bars in the immediate vicinity.

== Population ==
Historical population
Year	Pop.	±% p.a.
1968	739	—
1975	827	+1.62%
1982	828	+0.02%
1990	1,258	+5.37%
1999	1,741	+3.68%
2007	1,928	+1.28%
2012	2,099	+1.71%
2017	2,049	−0.48%
2023	1,987	−0.51%
Source: INSEE

== International relations ==
Bénouville is twinned with:

- Lynton and Lynmouth, United Kingdom

== See also ==
- Communes of the Calvados department
