= Thüngen =

- Municipality
- Coat of arms

- Location of Thüngen within Main-Spessart district
- Interactive map of Thüngen
- Location within Germany Location within Bavaria
- Coordinates: 49°56′32″N 9°51′34″E
- Country: Germany
- State: Bavaria
- Admin. region: Unterfranken
- District: Main-Spessart
- Municipal assoc.: Zellingen

Government
  - Mayor (2020–26): Lorenz Strifsky (SPD)

Area
  - Total: 13.6 km^{2} (5.3 sq mi)
- Elevation: 199 m (653 ft)

Population (2025-12-31)
  - Total: 1,265
  - Density: 93.0/km^{2} (241/sq mi)
- Time zone: UTC+01:00 (CET)
  - Summer (DST): UTC+02:00 (CEST)
- Postal codes: 97289
- Dialling codes: 09360
- Vehicle registration: MSP
- Website: www.markt-thuengen.de

Thüngen (German pronunciation: [ˈtʏŋən]) is a market municipality in the Main-Spessart district in the Regierungsbezirk of Lower Franconia (Unterfranken) in Bavaria, Germany and a member of the Verwaltungsgemeinschaft (Administrative Community) of Zellingen.

== Geography ==
=== Location ===
Thüngen lies in the Würzburg Region, 25 km north of Würzburg and 30 km west of Schweinfurt, in the north of the Main Triangle (Maindreieck) on the river Wern.

The community has only the Gemarkung (traditional rural cadastral area) of Thüngen.

== History ==
On 19 April 788, Thüngen had its first documentary mention. In the Codex Eberhardi, it says:

... Manto comes et frater eius Megingoz tradiderunt sancto Bonifacio bona sua in his locis: Isinhusen, Wanchei, Heselere, Tungede, Binizfelt, Hoholtesheim, Steti, Bucheled ...

The placename Thüngen comes from the word Thing (also seen in Old English þing in the same sense, namely “assembly”). A þing (pronounced the same way as the Modern English thing) or a Ding (Modern High German) was the name for Volksversammlungen (roughly, “folkmoots”) and assizes held under old Germanic law. Thüngen's origins therefore point to a place where such gatherings were held. This explanation for the community's name's origin is disputed, however, with alternate explanations positing a Celtic or Roman source for older forms of the name such as Thungidi or Tungede.

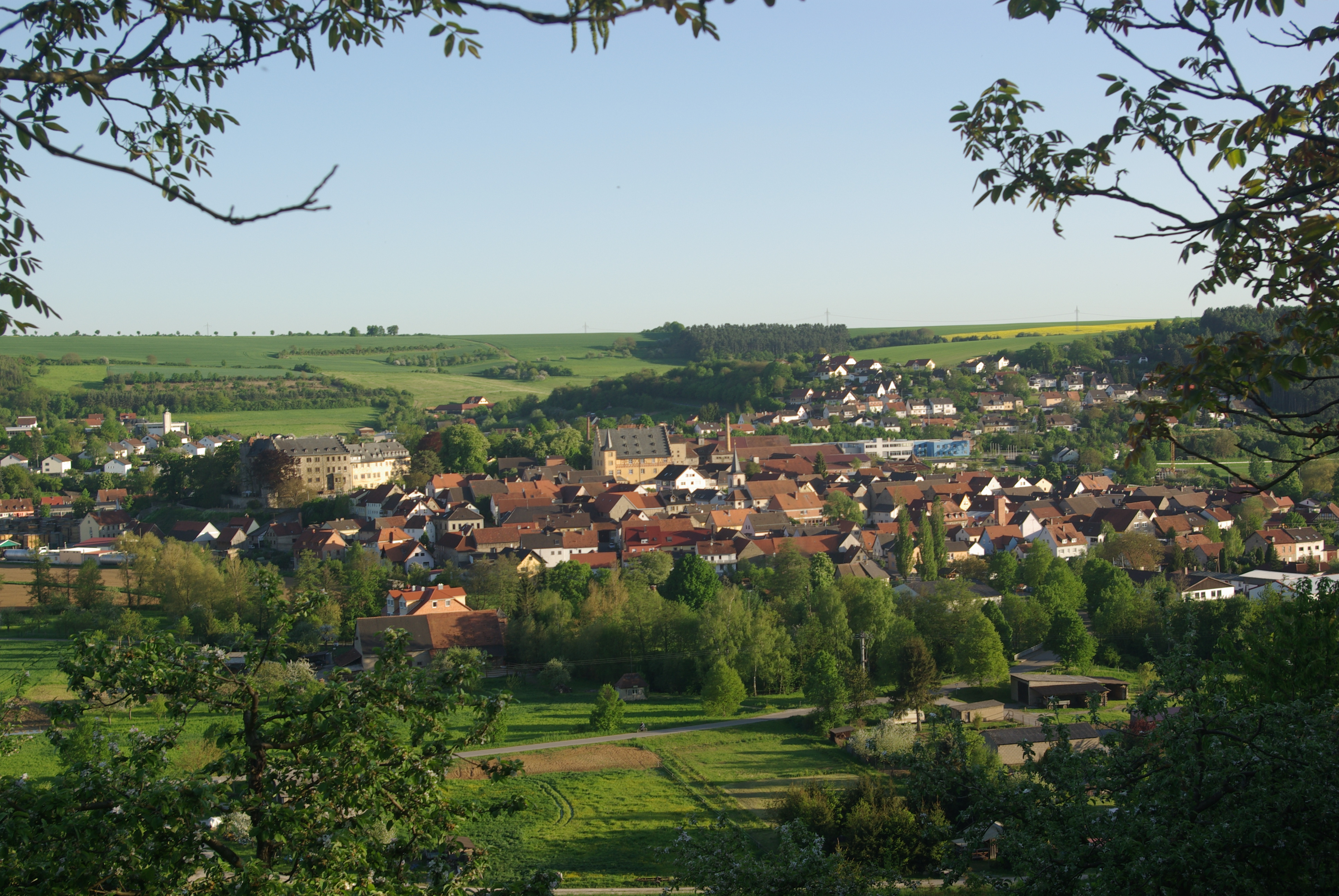
View from the north (Weinberg)

Until about 1200, the community's lords were the Counts of Henneberg. After they died out, the lordship was taken over by a knightly noble family who later named themselves “von Thüngen” after the place. Thüngen's history is tightly bound with this noble family.

In 1366, a Thüngen townsman was named in a document for the first time, and in 1419 the first village order was decreed. In 1465, Thüngen was raised to town, which allowed its fortification with walls and towers as well as a town constitution. Guilds could be introduced and weekly markets held. From 1551, with lordly approval, the Reformation was definitively introduced, which led to considerable contention between the denominations over the next few centuries, especially in the wake of the Thirty Years' War, which left part of the village in the hands of the Prince-Bishop of Würzburg (administered by the Juliusspital, a hospital foundation that still exists now). A rural Jewish community arose in the 16th century.

On 28 June 1814, in connection with the Napoleonic Wars, Thüngen was awarded to the Kingdom of Bavaria. In 1825, the guilds had to be shut down. Officially, town rights were never revoked. In 1846, the Schlossbrauerei Thüngen (brewery), still in business today, was founded by Wilhelm, Wolfgang and Hanskarl von Thüngen. Once the Werntalbahn (railway) was finished in 1879, the first train ran through Thüngen on 16 April.

In the presence of Prince Ludwig III of Bavaria, on 18 May 1892, the Ludwigslinde was planted at the Planplatz.

In 1923, the association Bayern und Reich (“Bavaria and Empire”) staged an event in Thüngen at which owing to arguments with inhabitants, a worker was killed. Of the 152 Jewish inhabitants still in the community in 1933, many had emigrated by 1940. Nevertheless, at least 50 Thüngen inhabitants were deported and murdered.

Since 1978, the market communities of Thüngen and Zellingen, and the communities of Himmelstadt and Retzstadt have formed the Verwaltungsgemeinschaft (Administrative Community) of Zellingen.

=== Population development ===
Within town limits, 1,336 inhabitants were counted in 1970, 1,341 in 1987 and in 2006 1,375.

== Politics ==
The mayor is Lorenz Strifsky, in office since 2014.

=== Community council ===
On the Marktgemeinderat (“market community council”) since May 2008 have been:

Freie Wähler:

Klaus Enzmann (1. BGM), Anja Morgenstern (3. BGM), Dieter Beutel, Thomas Ammersbach, Wolfgang Heß, Walter Lippert, Günter Morgenstern, Simone Hohmann

SPD:

Richard Steigerwald (Second Mayor), Lorenz Strifsky, Gerd Kunitzky

CSU:

Hubert Schömig, Christiane von Thüngen

Municipal taxes in 1999 amounted to €619,000 (converted), of which net business taxes amounted to €54,000.

=== Coat of arms ===
The community's arms might be described thus: Gules a cogwheel spoked of six argent between two ears of grain palewise with stalks turned to base Or, in a chief embattled of two merlons and one embrasure of the second a fess paly wavy of seven of the third and first.

The partition in the escutcheon is meant to resemble battlements (two merlons and, in the middle, one embrasure), which represents the local castle, which is the community's landmark. In the chief (the band of a different tincture on top) are the family arms of the Barons of Thüngen, Lutz Line. Underneath is a cogwheel as a symbol of local industry, and thereby also business, between two ears of grain as a symbol of local agriculture.

== Sightseeing ==
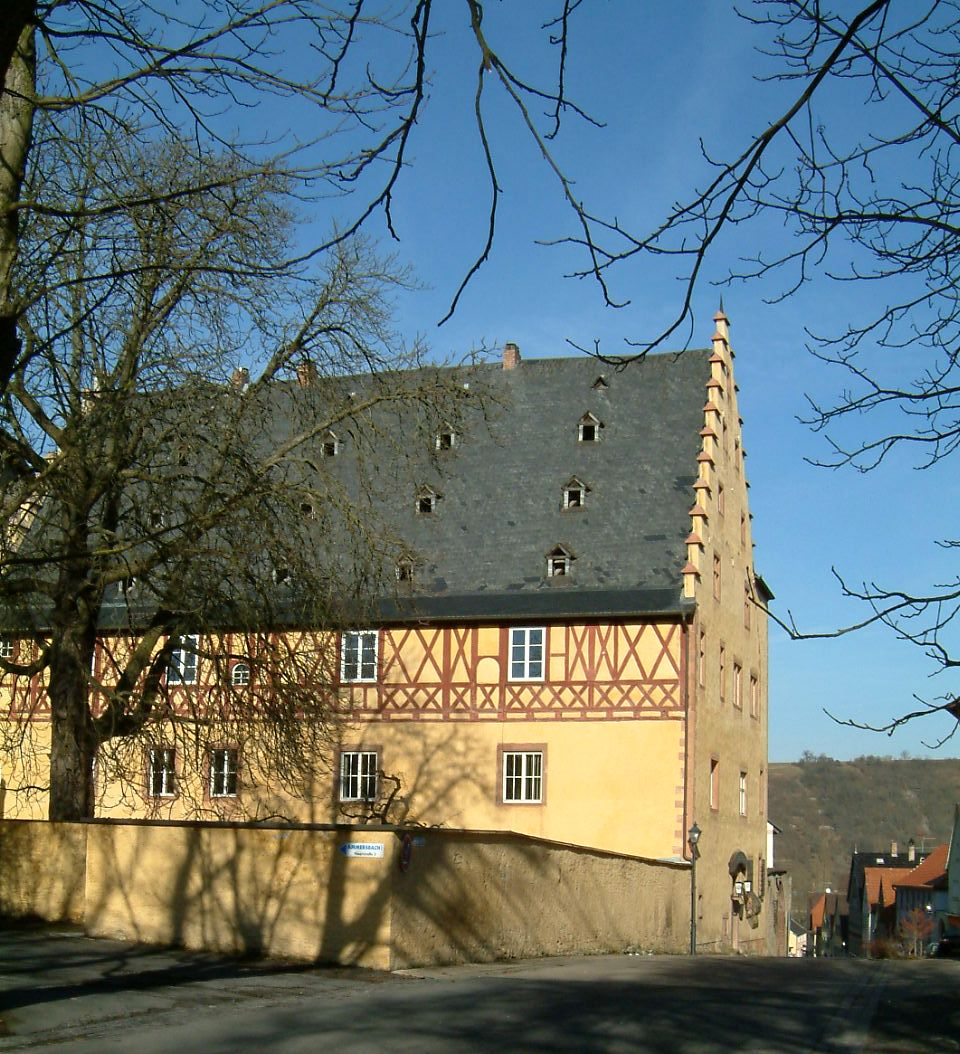
Burgsinner Schloss

East of the main street is found, in a somewhat overgrown park, the "Burgschloss" (49°56′32″N 9°51′26″E), an old residential castle from the 16th century, onto which is built the "Spitalschloss" (“Hospital Castle”, likewise from the 16th century, but converted to Gothic Revival style and expanded in the 19th century), in both of which live families of the Barons of Thüngen. South of this is found the "Alter Stock", a remnant of an early mediaeval castle complex. The "Burgsinner Schloss" west of the main street (and likewise from the 16th century) serves mainly economic ends (estate administration, castle brewery).

Saint George's Evangelical Church in the community core was destroyed in the Thirty Years' War and, owing to the Catholic Juliusspital’s ownership entitlements, could not be built again until the 19th century. At the Planplatz (square) stands the town hall from the Gründerzeit.

On the river Wern is found an historic weir, as well as the Waaghäuschen (“Little Weighing House” – a former livestock weighing building).

The former synagogue was damaged in 1938, and it has now been converted into a house. In November 2007 a memorial plaque was affixed to it.

== Economy and infrastructure ==
According to official statistics, there were 363 workers on the social welfare contribution rolls working in producing businesses in 1998. In trade and transport this was 0. In other areas, 37 workers on the social welfare contribution rolls were employed, and 541 such workers worked from home. There were 0 processing businesses. Two businesses were in construction, and furthermore, in 1999, there were 16 agricultural operations with a working area of 911 ha, with the Barons’ estate alone accounting for more than 300 ha of this.

=== Established businesses ===
- SchmitterGroup: auto supplier
- Ammersbach GmbH: construction technology
- Hugo Kämpf GmbH & Co. KG: lumber mill; the wood for the rebuilt church Frauenkirche in Dresden is from this mill

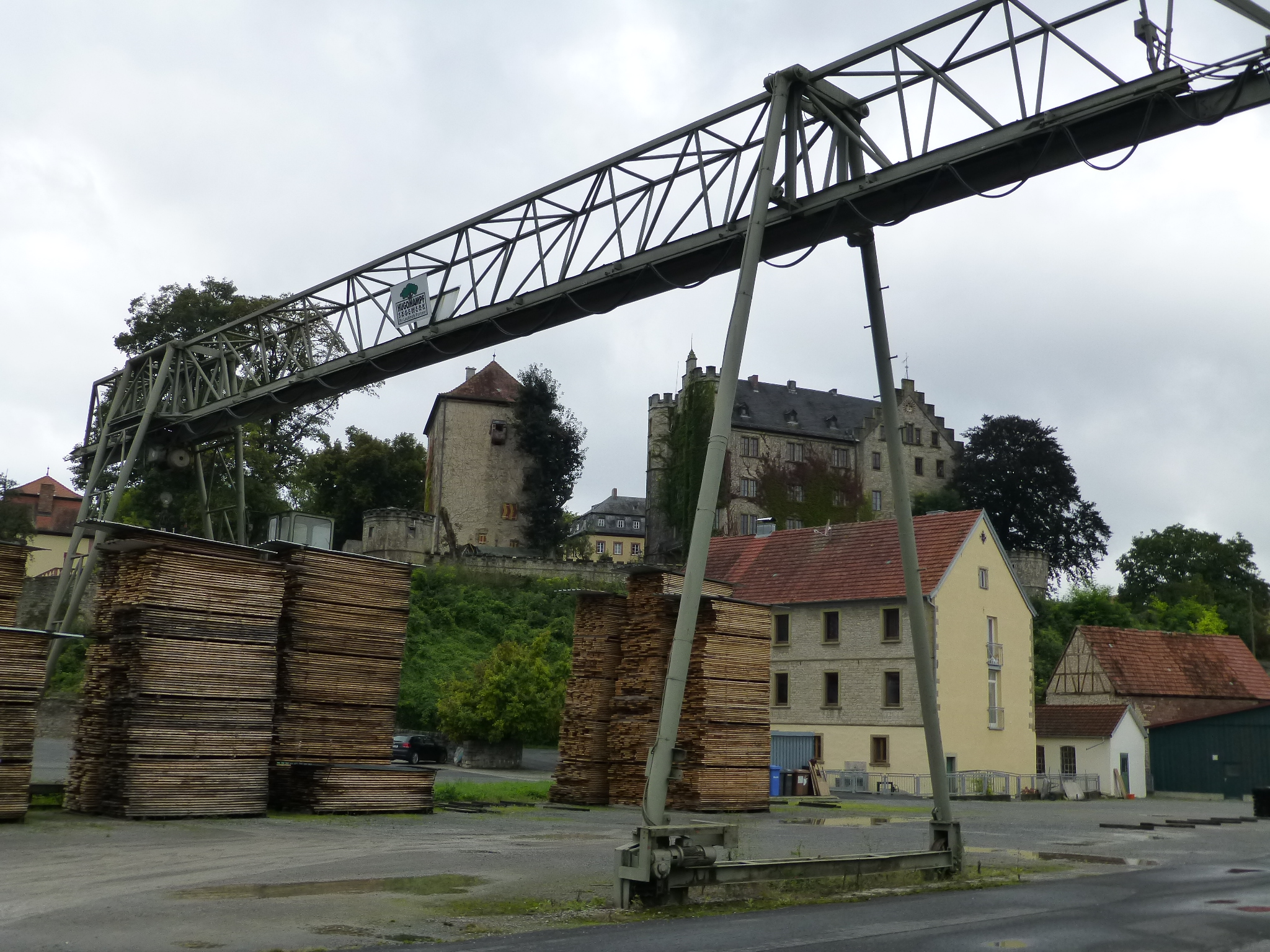
The sawmill Hugo Kämpf

- HERBERT BIRNBAUM Brotformenfabrik & Bäckereitechnik, Wolfgang Birnbaum E.K.: since 1847, breadmoulds made from rattan/wood and plastic (world market leader), as well as various bakery equipment and special machines. Export share 60% worldwide (roughly 45/55 Europe/world).
- Trachten-Benkert: costume tailoring and country house fashions
- KRESS-BAU GmbH: building firm
- Herzog von Franken (the former castle brewery)
- Fluri-Plast GmbH: plastics processing
- team eyedesign: advertising agency

=== Transport ===
Thüngen is crossed by Bundesstraße 26. On the heights of the inn Schwarzer Adler (“Black Eagle”), Staatsstraße (State Road) 2437 meets Bundesstraße 27 towards Würzburg on the B 26.

The electrified Werntalbahn (railway) is now only used for goods transport. The railway station is now a private dwelling.

Local public transport comes in the form of OVF (Omnibusverkehr Franken – “Franconia Omnibus Transport”) buses going towards Karlstadt/Gemünden or Schweinfurt and to Würzburg.

=== Education ===
As of 1999 the following institutions existed in Thüngen:

- Kindergartens: 50 place with 46 children
- Primary schools: 1 with 14 teachers and 224 pupils

== Other ==
In 2007, the local CSU association was taken as an example in a Stern article about Edmund Stoiber’s resignation from his offices of Minister-President and party chairman.
