= Erlabrunn =

- Municipality
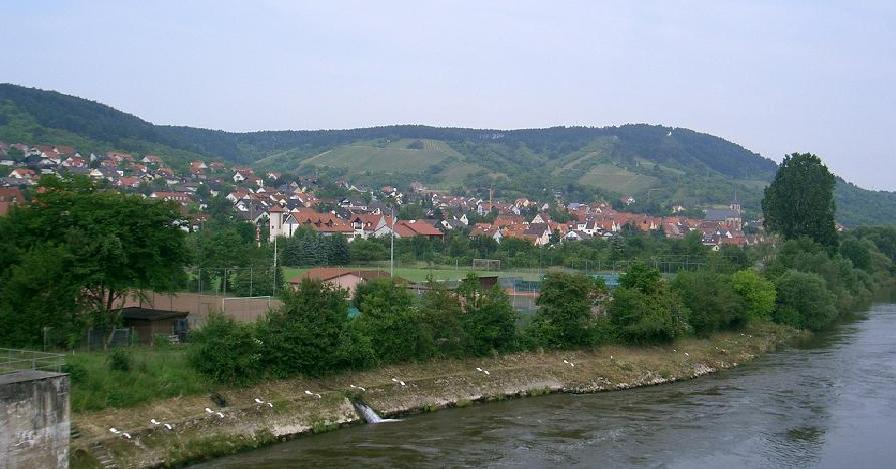
- Erlabrunn

- Coat of arms

- Location of Erlabrunn within Würzburg district
- Interactive map of Erlabrunn
- Location within Germany Location within Bavaria
- Coordinates: 49°52′N 9°51′E
- Country: Germany
- State: Bavaria
- Admin. region: Unterfranken
- District: Würzburg
- Municipal assoc.: Margetshöchheim

Government
  - Mayor (2020–26): Thomas Benkert

Area
  - Total: 4.01 km^{2} (1.55 sq mi)
- Elevation: 180 m (590 ft)

Population (2025-12-31)
  - Total: 1,835
  - Density: 458/km^{2} (1,190/sq mi)
- Time zone: UTC+01:00 (CET)
  - Summer (DST): UTC+02:00 (CEST)
- Postal codes: 97250
- Dialling codes: 09364
- Vehicle registration: WÜ
- Website: www.gemeinde-erlabrunn.de

Erlabrunn is a municipality in the district of Würzburg in Bavaria, Germany, situated on the left bank of the river Main. It forms an administrative division together with its neighbour Margetshöchheim. It is known for its viticulture and its orcharding.

Erlabrunn is about 10 kilometres (6 mi) north of Würzburg. Its neighbours are in the south Margetshöchheim und Veitshöchheim, in the west Leinach and in the north Zellingen and Thüngersheim. It was first mentioned in 1209.

Erlabrunn has had a town twinning arrangement with the French commune Quettehou since 1985.

== History ==
In the 12th century, Falkenberg Castle stood on the hill overlooking the village. The inhabitants of the castle Falkenberg were vassals of Ravensburg. As punishment for the murder of Bishop Konrad von Würzburg Querfurt the castle was razed. Today, only a few stones from the ruins can be seen.

The first written mention of the place dates from 1209 and means that the area was part of today's Erlabrunn the Earl of Rieneck. When the count started a loan from the Bishop of Wurzburg, he mortgaged the land to the diocese of Würzburg. As part of this was Erlabrunn—secularized in 1803 in favor of Bavaria—then in the Peace of Pressburg (1805) to Archduke Ferdinand III. From Tuscany to the formation of the Grand Duchy of Würzburg, with which it fell back to Bavaria in 1814. In the course of administrative reform in Bavaria was created—with the edict of 1818 community—the church today.

The Catholic parish of St. Andrew was built around 1381st 1597, the parish became independent, having previously belonged to the parish Hettstadt. Because of the danger of collapse in 1655 they demolished and rebuilt in 1656. The church was consecrated on 16 September 1657. The interior of the church was partially renovated in 1999.

In 1875, the pilgrimage church known locally as the Käppele (pronounced [ˈkɛpələ]) was erected on the Volkenberg hill above Erlabrunn, about half a kilometer north of the old castle ruins.

Since 1991 a renovation of the village has been taking place, under the motto "Altes erhalten Neues gestalten" (keeping the old, shaping the new). This has mainly involved reconstructing the main street through the old part of the village, and the lanes running off it. The work began at the north end, the Zellingerstraße. A new town house was opened in 2020.

== Mayor ==
The current mayor is Thomas Benkert, who has no party affiliation. The following is a list of mayors since the end of the war.

Years in office	Name	Party
1948–1960	Eugen Blass	Independent
1960–1984	Oskar Eckert	SPD
1984–1990	Hans Muth	CSU
1990–2002	Dr Friedrich Petermann	SPD
2002–2014	Günter Muth	CSU
2014 –	Thomas Benkert	Independent

== Infrastructure and amenities ==
Erlabrunn lies on the main road from Zellingen to Würzburg (Staatsstraße 2300). The Veitshöchheim railway station can be reached by a footbridge. There is weir on the river, with locks and a hydroelectric station. The Erlabrunn swimming lakes are a popular recreational facility in the summer. The village has an infant school for children aged 6–8, but this is to be closed as a result of the expansion of the primary school in Margetshöchheim.

== Gallery ==
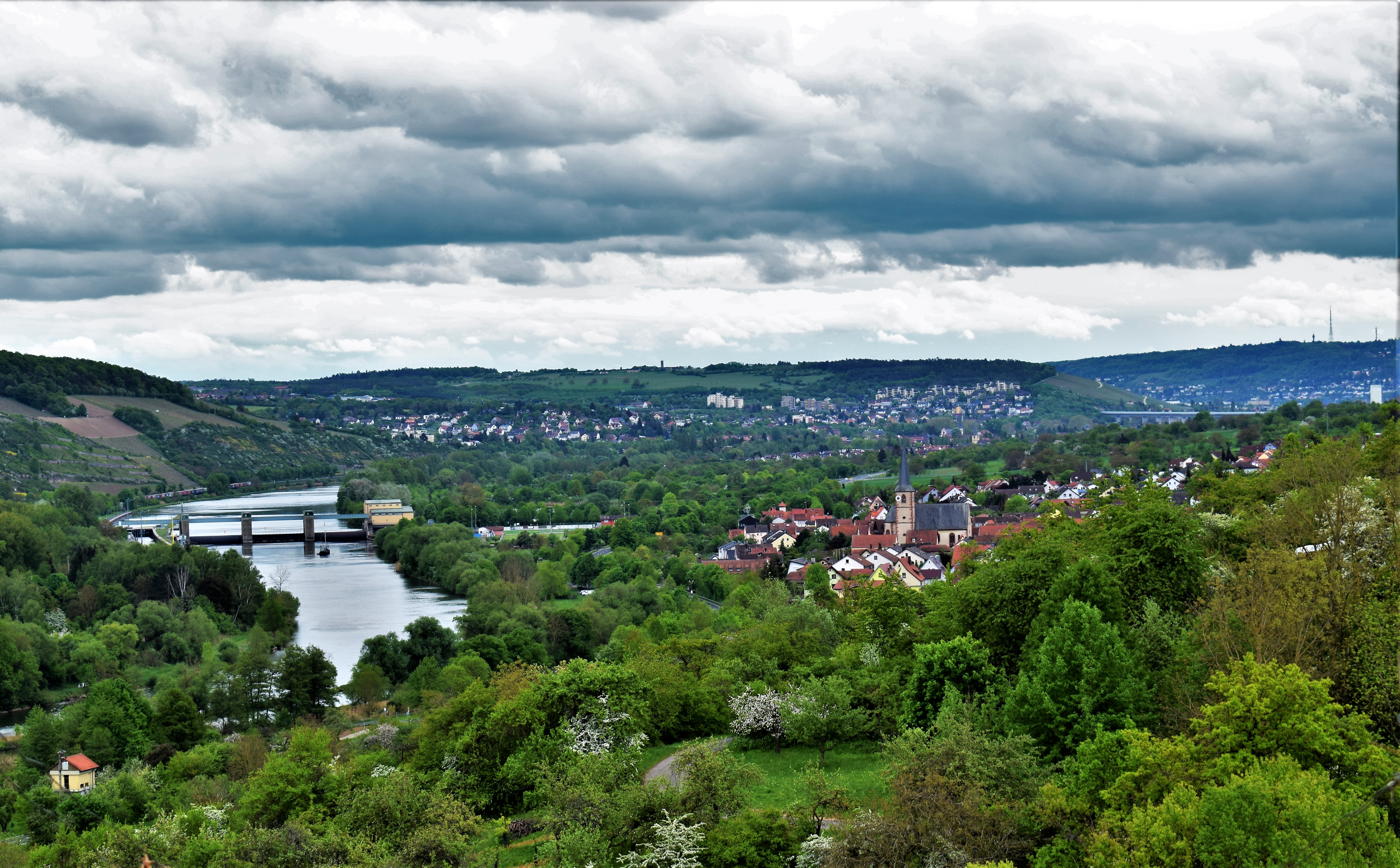
View from the north, with Veitshöchheim in the distance

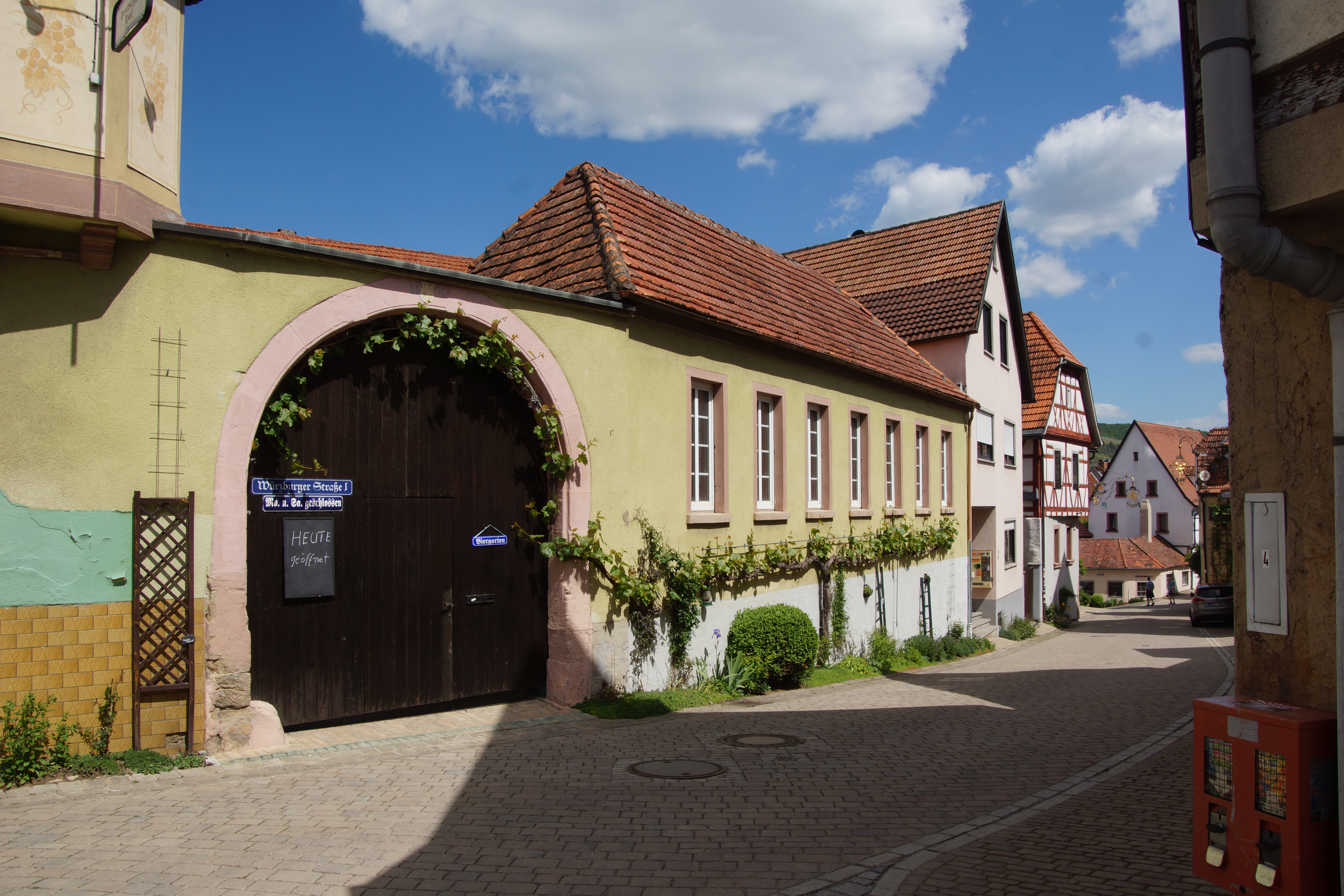
Zellingerstraße, looking south

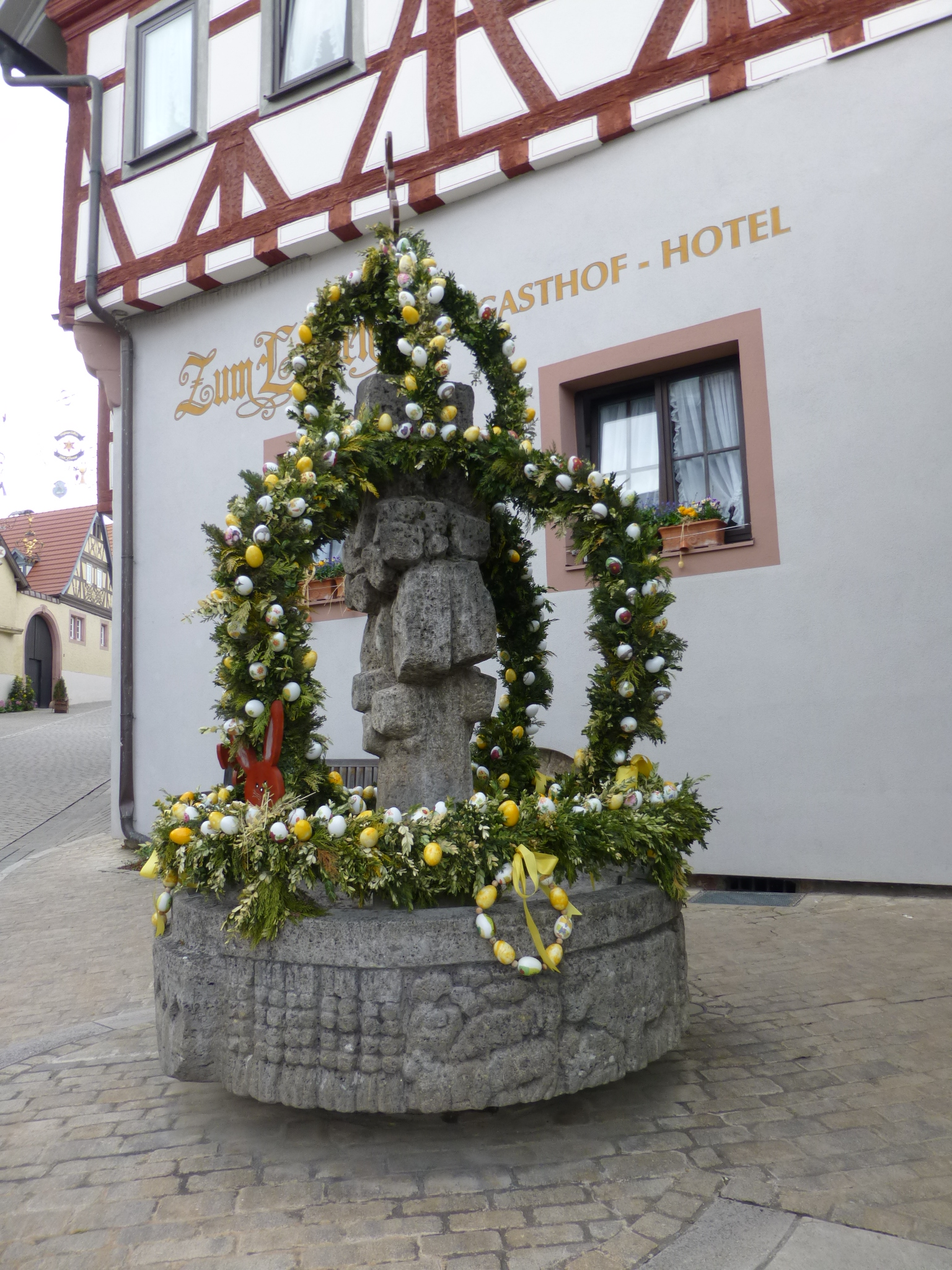
Easter fountain outside the inn "Zum Löwen"

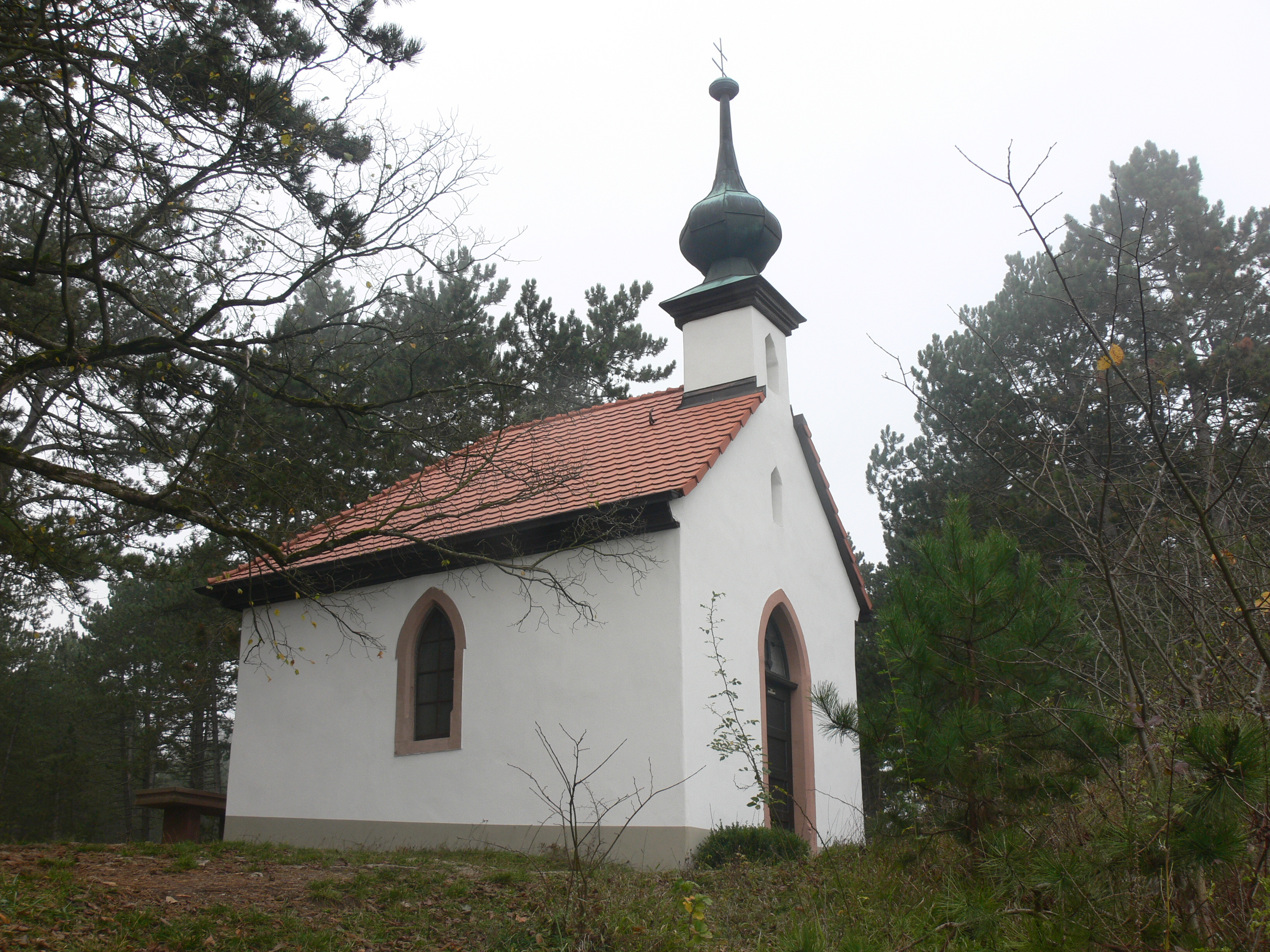
Chapel (Käppele) on the hill
