= Parc Festyland =

French theme park

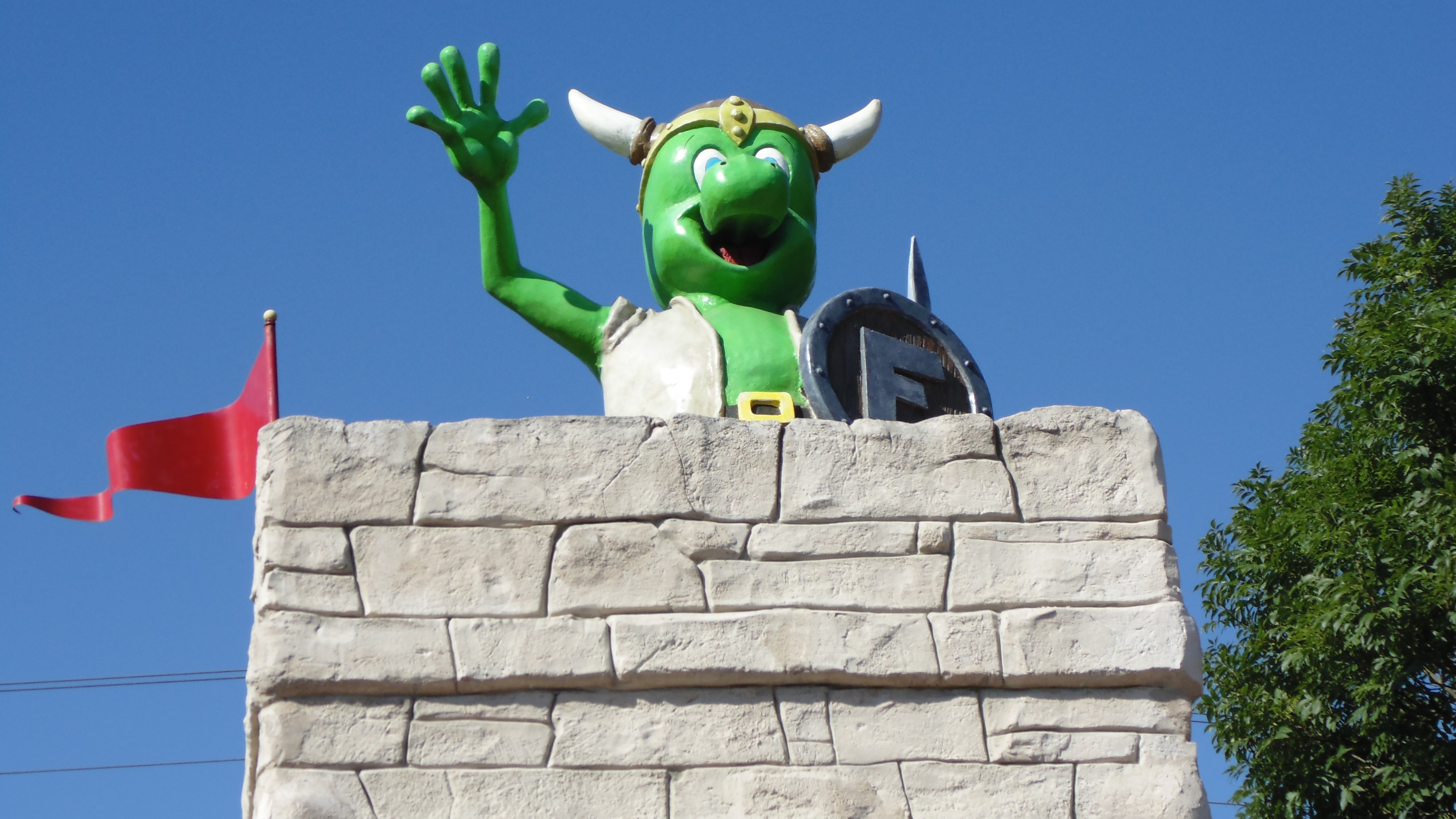
- The Festyland Mascot
- Interactive map of Parc Festyland
- Location: Caen, France, Bretteville-sur-Odon
- Coordinates: 49°10′58″N 0°25′23″E
- Opened: 11 June 1989
- Slogan: Défiez le!
- Attendance: 250,000
- Area: 9 ha (22 acres)

Attractions
- Total: 27
- Roller coasters: 2
- Water rides: 3

Parc Festyland is a theme park in the commune of Bretteville-sur-Odon. The commune and park are situated within the Caen ringroad (A13/A84) in Lower Normandy, France. Sometimes referred to as being in Carpiquet in Greater Caen, the theme park receives approximately 250,000 visitors a year.

== Background ==
Parc Festyland is a true theme park as it has a central unifying theme in accordance with which the whole park - from rides to restaurants to surroundings - is built. The theme of Parc Festyland is the 1066 era. Being a family theme park, it concentrates on the architecture and personalities of the time. The park's logo is a friendly, young-looking dragon's head sporting a Viking hat and a large grin.

== History ==
The park was originally located in Dialan sur Chaîne. It moved in 1977 to its present site when it sold the land to the Zoo de Jurques.

=== Visiting Figures ===
In 2024, the park received 253,000 visitors.

== Advertising ==
Parc Festyland runs an advertising campaign in association with the Caen tourist office. In all language versions of the booklet, the first inner page is a full colour advert for the park. It consists of the Parc Festyland name and logo, the catchphrase ("defiez le!!!"), contact details (website address and phone number), and two pictures of women appearing to enjoy themselves at the park, with a large rollercoaster in the background.

== Catchphrase ==
The park's motto is Défiez le!. The English version of the Caen tourist office booklet translates this phrase as 'brave it'. It refers to braving the main attraction (a 59 second long roller coaster).

== Features ==
=== Rides in the Park ===
- The Drakkar Express is a steel roller coaster, the cars of which are designed to resemble Viking ships.
- The bumper boats are waterborne dodgem cars. The cars seat either one person, or an adult and a small child, however height restrictions do apply. Each car consists of a plastic moulded steering platform supported by an inflated rubber cushion.
- The bateaux les pentes vertigineuses du Piratak are a water slide with boats.

==== Prehistyland ====
A section of the park is themed to the prehistoric era, instead of 1066 as is the rest of the park. The prehistoric area includes life size models of dinosaurs and a rope bridge traversing a lake.

==== Floral Decorations ====
There are gardens with floral decorations and snail-shaped vehicles on a fixed tracks that take visitors on tours.
