= Jurques =

- Part of Dialan sur Chaîne
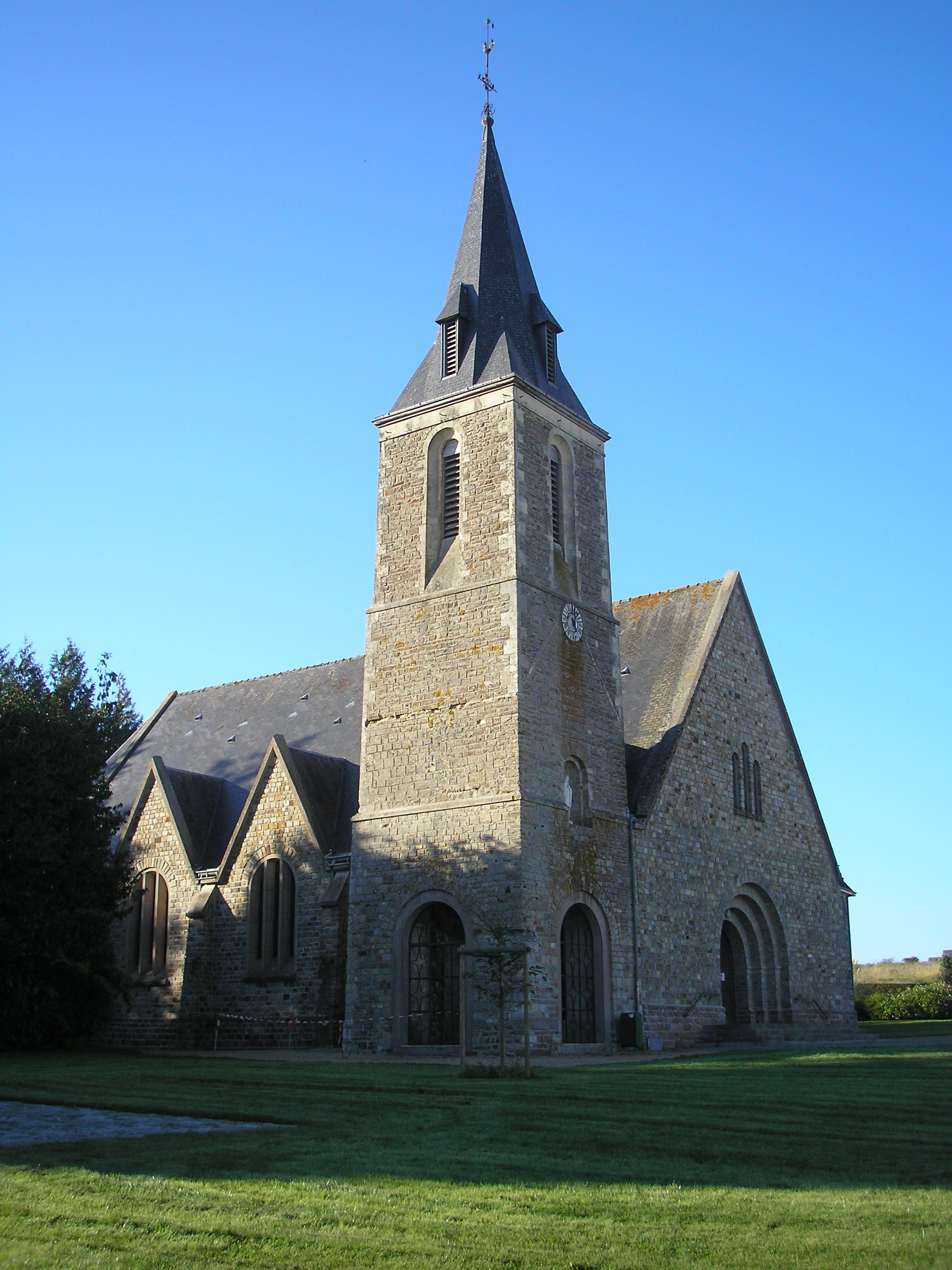
- Location of Jurques
- Location within France Location within Normandy
- Coordinates: 49°01′07″N 0°44′28″W
- Country: France
- Region: Normandy
- Department: Calvados
- Arrondissement: Vire
- Canton: Les Monts d'Aunay
- Commune: Dialan sur Chaîne
- Area^{1}: 12.69 km^{2} (4.90 sq mi)
- Elevation: 261 m (856 ft)
- Highest elevation: 351 m (1,152 ft)
- Lowest elevation: 139 m (456 ft)
- Population (2023): 662
  - Density: 52.2/km^{2} (135/sq mi)
- Time zone: UTC+01:00 (CET)
  - Summer (DST): UTC+02:00 (CEST)
- Postal code: 14260
- ^{1} French Land Register data, which excludes lakes, ponds, glaciers > 1 km^{2} (0.386 sq mi or 247 acres) and river estuaries.

Jurques (French pronunciation: [ʒyʁk]) is a former commune in the Calvados department in the Normandy region in northwestern France. On 1 January 2017, it was merged into the new commune Dialan sur Chaîne.

== See also ==
- Communes of the Calvados department
