= Glattbach =

- Municipality
- Coat of arms

- Location of Glattbach within Aschaffenburg district
- Interactive map of Glattbach
- Location within Germany Location within Bavaria
- Coordinates: 50°00′20″N 09°08′50″E
- Country: Germany
- State: Bavaria
- Admin. region: Unterfranken
- District: Aschaffenburg

Government
  - Mayor (2020–26): Kurt Baier

Area
  - Total: 3.53 km^{2} (1.36 sq mi)
- Elevation: 182 m (597 ft)

Population (2025-12-31)
  - Total: 3,183
  - Density: 902/km^{2} (2,340/sq mi)
- Time zone: UTC+01:00 (CET)
  - Summer (DST): UTC+02:00 (CEST)
- Postal codes: 63864
- Dialling codes: 06021
- Vehicle registration: AB
- Website: www.glattbach.de

Glattbach (German pronunciation: [ˈɡlatbax]) is a municipality in the Aschaffenburg district (landkreis) in the administrative region (regierungsbezirk) of Lower Franconia (Unterfranken) in Bavaria, Germany. It has around 6,800 inhabitants (2024). The town is located in a valley north of Aschaffenburg town on the western edge of the Spessart range.

== History ==
In the 12th century, the forest still reached the town gates at Aschaffenburg. The Mainz Archbishop's serfs lived in small settlements in the dales, and worked in forestry, hunting and working small farms. Out of one such settlement grew the village of Glattbach over the course of the centuries, known earlier as Gladebach or Gladbach. It might have got its name from the goldlike glittering in the local stone found on the banks and the bed of the brook (glad meant “glittering”, and Bach is German for “brook”). The economic relationships were quite minimal. The only wealth came with the vineyards, which lay on the sunny south and southwest slopes. Cadastral names such as Wingert unterm Dorf, Wingert oberm Dorf and Am heißen Stein still recall the local winegrowing today. Since Glattbacher wine was known to be good, it led to Count Schönborn owning a vineyard here. After many bad harvests, the vines were torn up in the late 18th century, and replaced with intensive fruit growing, specifically of cherries. In industry, linen weaving was strongly represented. In 1832, seventeen linen weavers were registered in the old municipality books.

The endless sharing out of estates under Electoral Mainz inheritance law meant that the area of land available for each farmer to work was forever shrinking. While only ten families shared the 310 ha municipal area in 1661, by the mid 18th century there were 50 neighbours (or Nachbarn, as residents were called, as opposed to those who had moved to the municipality and therefore neither owned land nor had rights) who had to eke out their lives from the soil.

The only major property, with 97 Morgen (somewhat less than 200 000 m^{2}), was the herrschaftliches Höfchen (“Manorial Estate”), which passed to Kollegiatsstift St Peter und Alexander from noble ownership as a donation in 1334, later being bestowed by the stift upon various country noblemen. Later still, it passed to the liege lord, the Elector of Mainz, and around 1837 it was sold into private ownership to the landed family Heeg. About 1800, the old Hofreith was torn down, and across the road a major estate with an oil and tobacco mill and a wine press was built, today known as the Helmshof.

The village's location in a secluded dale meant that there was never any passing traffic. Nevertheless, in no way was Glattbach spared the hardship and war that time and again beset the Lower Main area. This may well have had something to do with the village's lying right near the town of Aschaffenburg, or perhaps it was the Gelnhäuser Straße, an old army and trade road running by Glattbach to the west, which led up to the Johannesberger Höhe (heights). Warlike people came plundering, burning and murdering their way through the village, bringing the population hardship and misery. Pestilence took a heavy toll. After the Thirty Years' War, only ten families out of 33 were still alive, and 20 houses were destroyed. Often people fled before the soldiers. In 1743, when the English were plundering the whole municipality from 18 to 26 June, the population fled, hiding out in the Spessart forests.

In the war's wake came further sickness. The grimmest Plague years, 1606 and 1636, are today still remembered by two Bildstöcke (sing. Bildstock – a cross-shaped or columnar pillar functioning as a wayside shrine), called Peststeine (“Plague stones”), on the main road. In the time of greatest hardship, the population vowed to hold a festival and repentance day “for everlasting time” if the sickness came to an end. On this so-called Hellfeiertag (roughly “Light Holiday” – despite the similarity in pronunciation, there is no connection with “hellfire”), the Friday before Michaelmas, it was forbidden to light a fire in any hearth, and both people and livestock observed a strict fast and did no work. The vow was strictly kept right up until the First World War.

As early as the 12th century, Glattbach was mentioned as a branch of Saint Agatha's parish at Aschaffenburg. There is, however, no mention of a church until the 17th century. In 1682, a chapel in Saint Nicholas's honour was built, and consecrated by the Capuchin priest Martin von Cochem, a famous repentance preacher and folk writer. At that time, the municipality had some 180 to 200 inhabitants. The chapel stood with its graveyard and schoolhouse on the lot now occupied by the church. The chapel was not standing very long. Already by 1727, a new church was being built there, the Magdalenenkirchlein (roughly “Mary Magdalene’s Little Church”). It was built in four months. Services were held only once a month, on a weekday. Only from 1775 onwards does it seem that there were services on Sunday – and even then only over the winter – mostly given by a Capuchin priest. In 1890, a local chaplaincy was instituted, which was raised to parish on 14 December 1922. Ten clergy worked as local chaplains in Glattbach. The first parish priest was Christian Benz from Weibersbrunn, who held the post for 25 years before he died in an accident on 20 December 1948. In 1899 the Magdalenenkirchlein was torn down. Building work then began on today's Gothic Revival parish church, Maria Himmelfahrt (“Assumption of Mary”), which was consecrated on 15 August 1901. There were some 700 Catholic parishioners in those days.

Already by about 1730, there was school in Glattbach. The schoolmasters were, until far into the 19th century, craftsmen who pursued teaching only as a sideline or who employed helpers to do it. The oldest known schoolhouse stood behind the Magdalenenkirchlein and contained not only a schoolroom and a teacher's dwelling, but also a communal room. In 1878 the second schoolhouse was built, which at the time was one of the finest for a great distance. Since 1986 it has served as the town hall, after the elementary school had moved to the new building auf dem Schwalbesgraben, one wing in 1958, and the other in 1964.

The industrialization of the 19th century and the great splintering of land ownership by inheritances that were endlessly carving plots into smaller ones brought about the municipality's first structural shift from purely a farming village to a workers’ village. A man from Glattbach, a tailor named Johann Desch born in 1848, had the idea of sewing suits by standard measurements ahead of time, and having the workers in their homes finish the sewing. These first ready-to-wear suits sold briskly in the growing industrial towns of Hanau, Frankfurt and Offenbach. The business quickly grew, and Johann Desch bought a house in Aschaffenburg. In 1874, he had the first men's clothing factory entered into the town's commercial registry. This branch of industry in the Aschaffenburg area that was once so important had its cradle in that tailor's shop in Glattbach.

In the Second World War, the village suffered greatly under the bombings in 1944 and 1945. Fourteen people were killed in these raids, and more than a hundred buildings were utterly or partly destroyed, among them the kindergarten and the gymnasium. After the war, reconstruction was implemented through brisk building activity and a heavy inflow of inhabitants. Beginning then, Glattbach became a residential municipality with nearly 3,800 inhabitants, favoured by its proximity to the town and its scenically charming location. The inhabitants are mostly commuters who overwhelmingly have jobs in Aschaffenburg.

== Governance ==
=== Municipal council ===
The council is made up of 17 council members, counting the full-time mayor. The last elections took place on March 15, 2020.

| Election | CSU | SPD | Pro Glattbach | Glattbach! | Bürger Glattbachs | Total |
| 2008 | 8 | 2 | 7 | - | - | 17 seats |
| 2020 | 6 | 3 | 0 | 5 | 3 | 17 seats |

The acting mayor is Kurt Baier (CSU/independent). He was elected in a runoff on March 29, 2020, with 50.17% of all votes.

=== Coat of arms ===
The municipality's arms might be described thus: Or a bend sinister wavy azure, in chief an inescutcheon sable a stork with two heads argent armed gules, the sinister reguardant from the base issuant, in base three yarn reels palewise argent in bend sinister wound with yarn gules.

The placename ending —bach, which is German for “brook”, is seen in the arms as the wavy blue bend sinister – that is to say, slanted stripe beginning at the top on the sinister (armsbearer's left, viewer's right) side. The two-headed stork in the inescutcheon comes from the arms once borne by the noble family von Wasen. They owned an estate in the municipality from 1387 to 1528. The yarn reels refer to the beginnings of the Aschaffenburg clothing industry.

The arms have been borne since 1980.

=== Town twinning ===
- Bretteville-sur-Odon, Calvados, France
- (Germany) Glattbach, Gemeindeteil of Lindenfels in the Odenwald
- (Germany) Glattbach, Gemeindeteil of Dermbach in Thuringia

== Infrastructure ==
=== Transport ===
- Bus route 9 to Aschaffenburg
- Autobahn A 3, between Frankfurt (roughly 45 km away) and Würzburg (roughly 75 km away).

== Notable people ==
- Johann Desch, was a cofounder of industrial clothing production in Germany, according to some.
- Alois Bergmann-Franken (b. 1897 as Alois Bergmann in Glattbach; d. 1965 in Glattbach) was a German painter active throughout the Aschaffenburg district.
