= Käppele =

- Wallfahrtskirche Mariä Heimsuchung
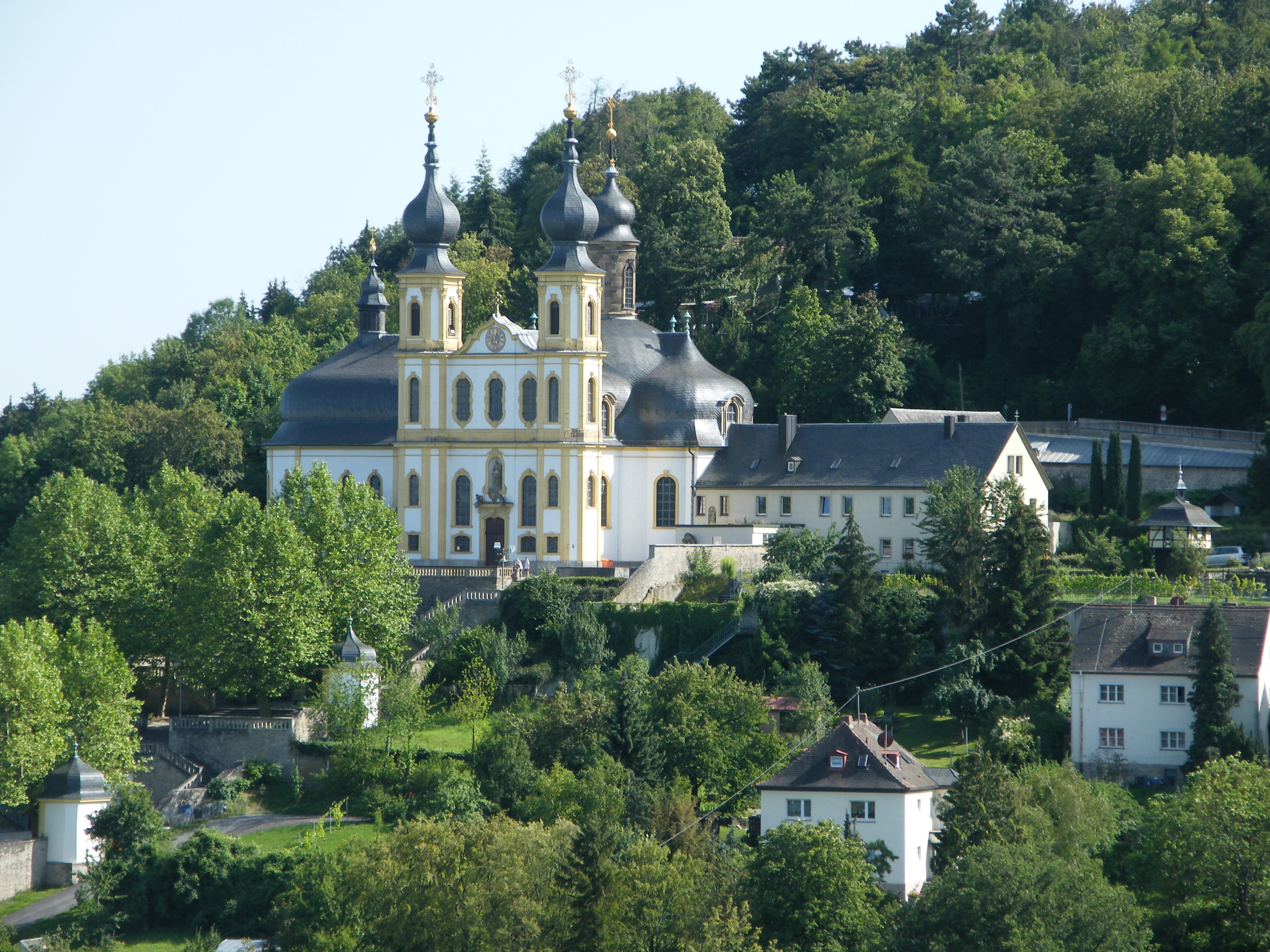
- Käppele as seen from Fortress Marienberg

- Location within Bavaria Location within Germany

Religion
- Affiliation: Roman Catholic
- Province: Bavaria
- Region: Franconia
- Year consecrated: 1754

Location
- Location: Nikolausberg, Würzburg
- Municipality: Würzburg
- State: Germany
- Interactive map of Käppele
- Coordinates: 49°47′04″N 9°55′19″E

Architecture
- Architect: Balthasar Neumann
- Style: Rococo
- Groundbreaking: 1748
- Completed: 1750 (structures), 1821 (interior furnishings)

The Käppele ('Little Chapel') is the commonly used name for the Wallfahrtskirche Mariä Heimsuchung ('Pilgrimage Church of the Visitation of Mary'), located on a hill above Würzburg, in Germany. (It must not be confused with the Marienkapelle, or Chapel of Mary, located in the centre of the same city.) It was built following plans by Balthasar Neumann in the mid-18th century in Rococo style. Until 2014 it was attended to by members of the Capuchins.

== Geography ==
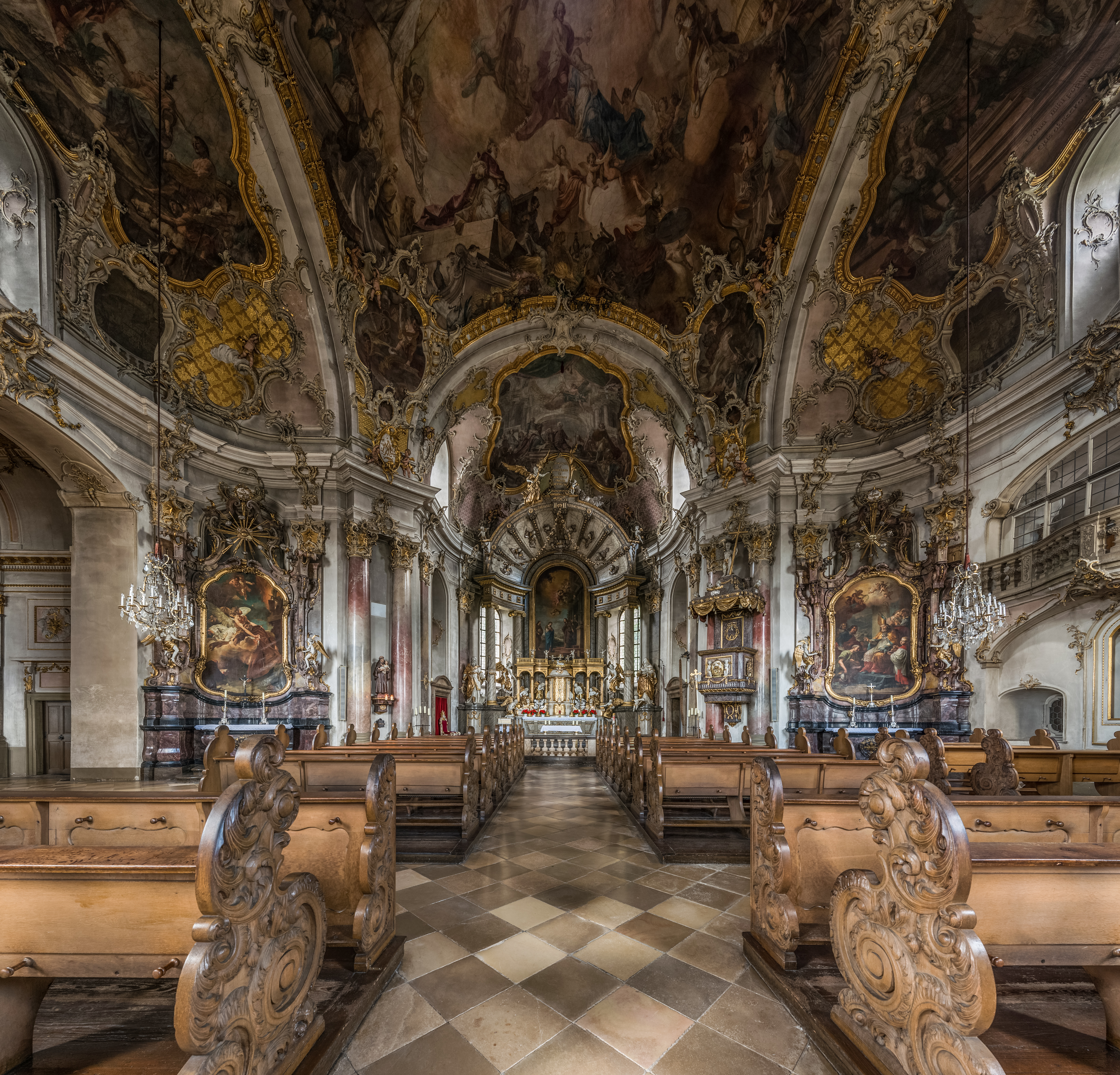
Interior of the church

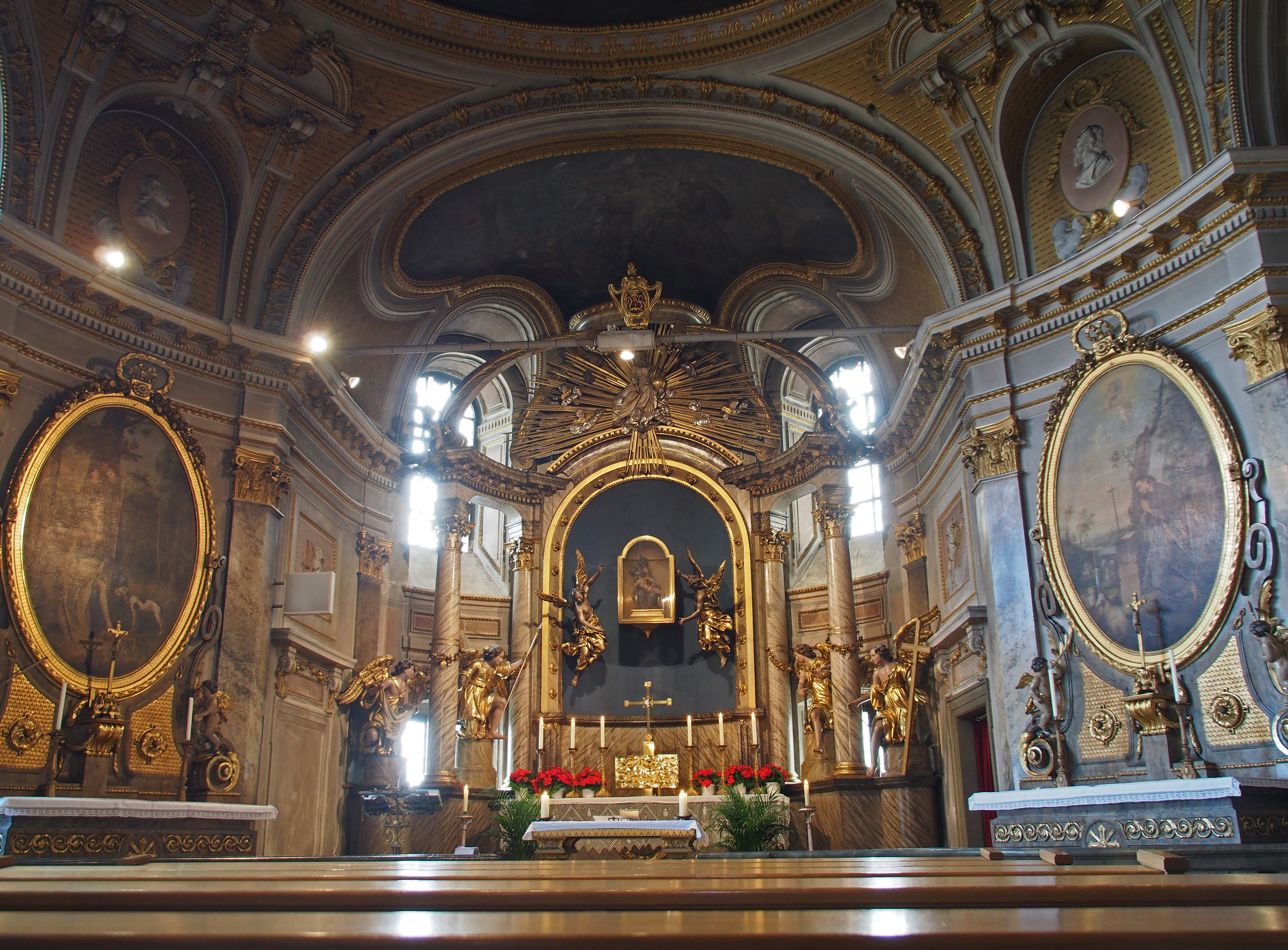
Alte Gnadenkapelle with pietà from around 1640

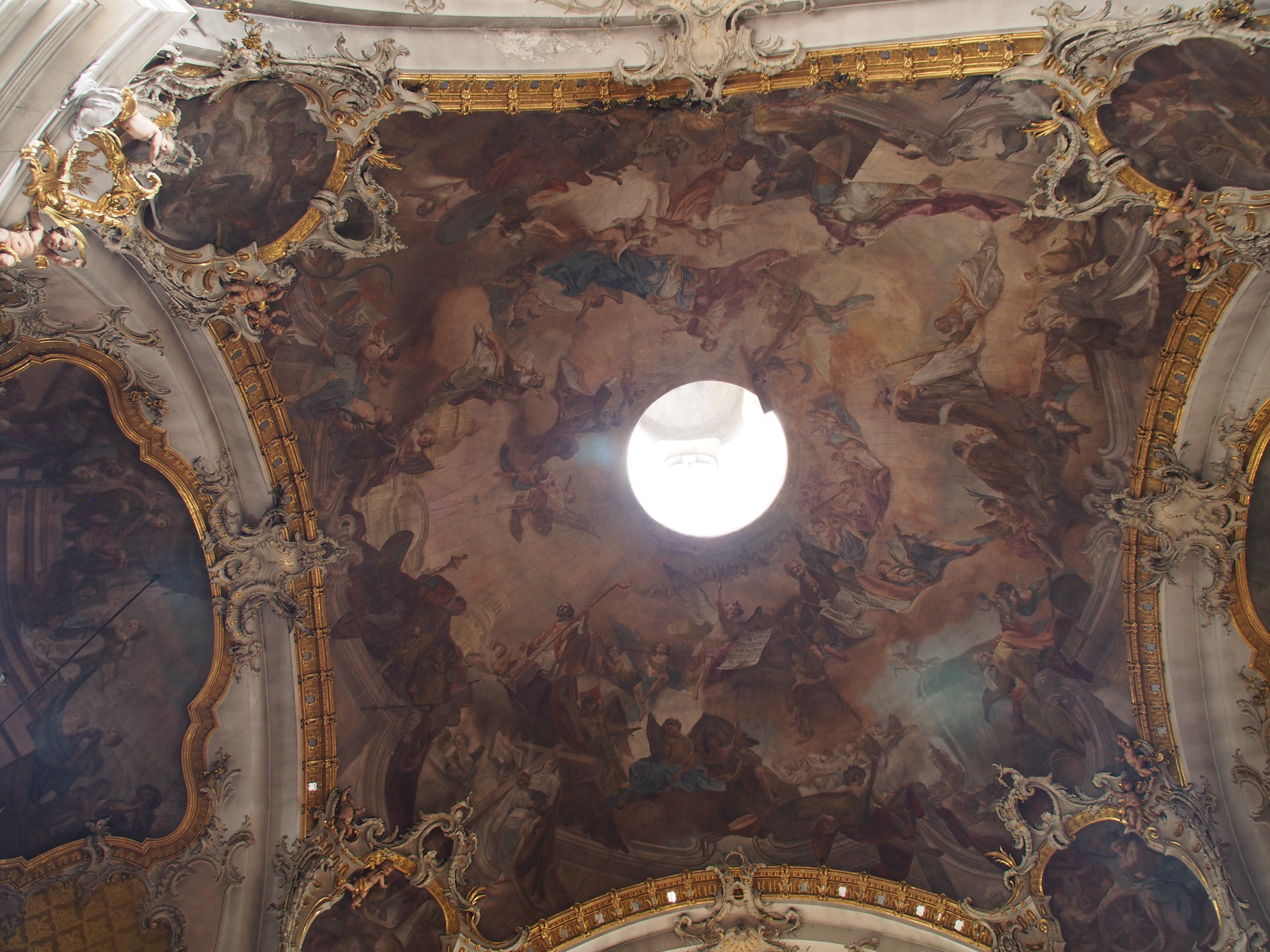
Ceiling fresco in the choir of the church

Floorplan of Käppele

The church is located on the north-eastern slope of the 366 metre Nikolausberg, below the Frankenwarte and above the left bank of the Main in the city of Würzburg, the capital of Lower Franconia in the north of Bavaria, Germany.

== Etymology ==
In the Swabian and Franconian dialects, the word Käppele (pronounced [ˈkɛpələ]) is a diminutive of the German word Kapelle (pronounced [kaˈpɛlə]), meaning 'chapel', and is also used in the names of a number of other, mostly small, hill-top chapels in the area, such as the Erlabrunner Käppele, located 15 km further north, or the Zeiler Käppele, some 70 km to the east. Others can be found in Bühlertann, Ebern, Neudenau, Röthlein, Rottendorf, Scheer and elsewhere.

== History ==
Originally, a local fisher erected a pietà in what was then a vineyard in 1640. About ten years later, four miracle cures were reported in connection with the statue. Around 1650, a first chapel was built around the pietà. Together with some other reported phenomena, the cures began to attract pilgrims to the site, especially around pentecost. In 1690 and 1713, the original chapel was increased in size. Balthasar Neumann, architect of the UNESCO World Heritage Site Würzburg Residence, then drew up plans for a new church which incorporated the older chapel as the Alte Gnadenkapelle. The foundation stone was laid on 5 April 1748. Construction took until 1750 but the interior furnishings were not finished until 1821. The new chapel was officially inaugurated only on 21 September 1824, due to earlier disruptions caused by securalization of 1803. However, the capuchins already began holding services in 1754. During the Bombing of Würzburg in World War II the chapel was damaged slightly.

== Architecture ==
A way of the cross with 14 Stations of the Cross marked by small chapels leads up to the Käppele. These were based on an idea by Neumann, but completed only in 1799. The live-sized statue groups (77 figures) were created by Simon and Peter Wagner.

The church's double-towered front and the roof with its cupolas and roof lanterns give it an unusual appearance that distinguishes it from the other churches of Würzburg. The interior features ceiling frescos by Matthäus Günther from 1752 and 1781 and stucco work by Johann Michael Feuchtmayer (the Younger). The side altars date to 1768. The neoclassical high altar was made in 1799.

The organ dates to 1752, made by Christian Köhler from Frankfurt (renovated in 1991).

Votive offerings dedicated to the miraculous pietà in the Mirakelgang reflect local devoutness and tastes of the 19th and 20th centuries.

== Today ==
Apart from being a tourist attraction, the Käppele remains a popular pilgrimage site, especially at pentecost.

The Käppele is administered by the Kirchenstiftung Käppele. The attached monastery and the garden are property of the Capuchins, but they are trying to sell them to the Diocese of Würzburg. In October 2014, the Capuchins left the Käppele. It is now cared for by a rector.

As of October 2014, a renovation of the interior in two stages was planned within the next two years.
