= Canton of Caen-1 =

Coordinates: 49.186°N 0.374°W

Caen-1
- Canton
- Interactive map of Caen-1
- Country: France
- Region: Normandy
- Department: Calvados
- No. of communes: {{{nbcomm}}}

Government
  - Representatives (2021–2028): Sophie Simonnet; Ludwig Willaume
- Population (2023): 29,282
- INSEE code: 14 05

The canton of Caen-1 is an administrative division of the Calvados department, northwestern France. Its borders were modified at the French canton reorganisation which came into effect in March 2015. Its seat is in Caen.

== Composition ==
It consists of the following communes:

1. Bretteville-sur-Odon
2. Caen (partly)
3. Mouen
4. Tourville-sur-Odon
5. Verson

== Councillors ==
Election	Councillors	Party	Occupation
2015	Sonia de La Provôté	UDI	Councillor of Caen; Former Departmental Councillor for Canton of Caen-3
2015	Ludwig Willaume	LR	Councillor of Caen
2017	Sophie Simonnet	DVD	Councillor of Caen
2021	Sophie Simonnet	DVD	Councillor of Caen
2021	Ludwig Willaume	LR	Councillor of Caen

- On October 1, 2017, Sonia de La Provôté becomes Senator. She is replaced by her substitute, Sophie Simonnet.

== Pictures of the canton ==
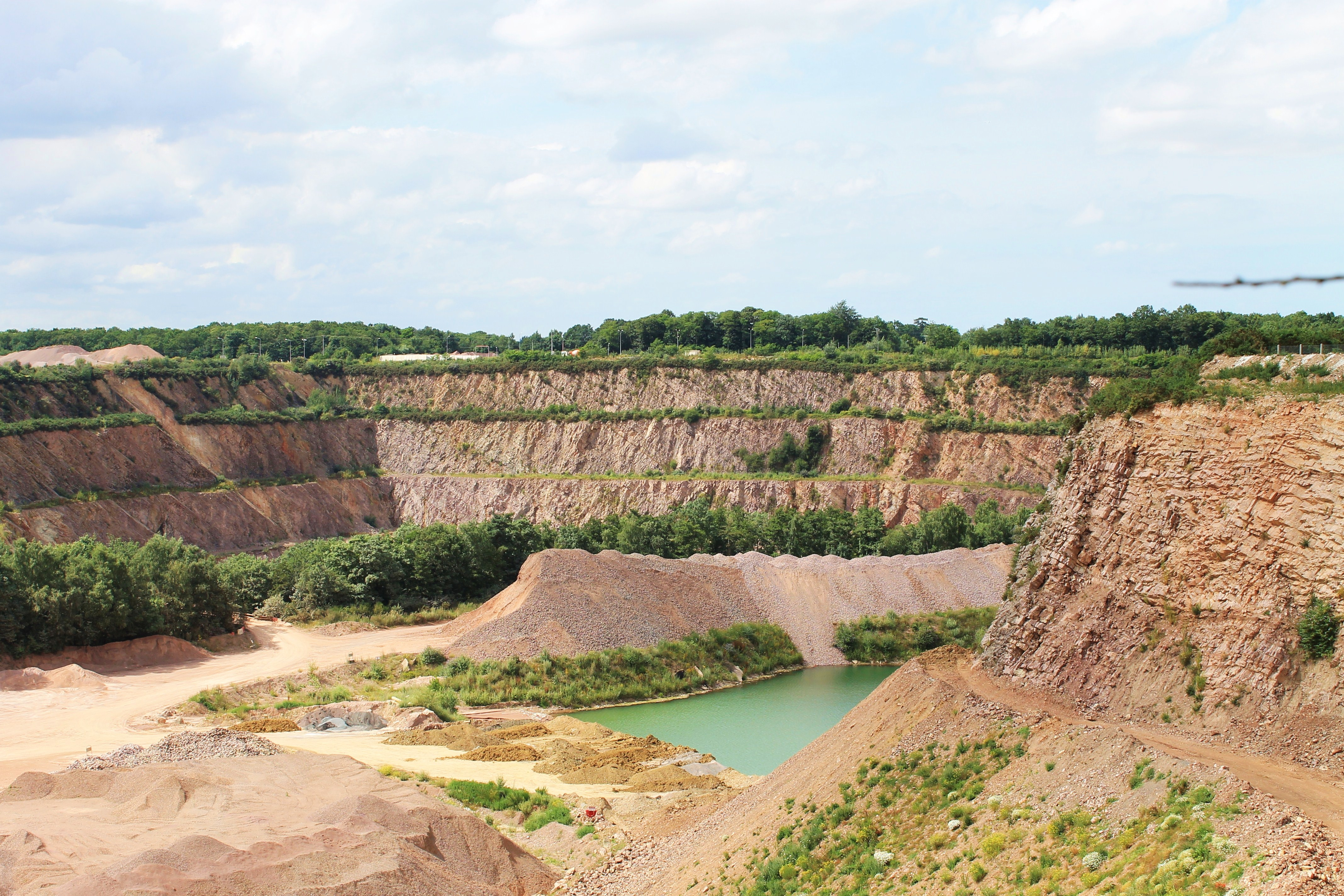
Quarry of Mouen

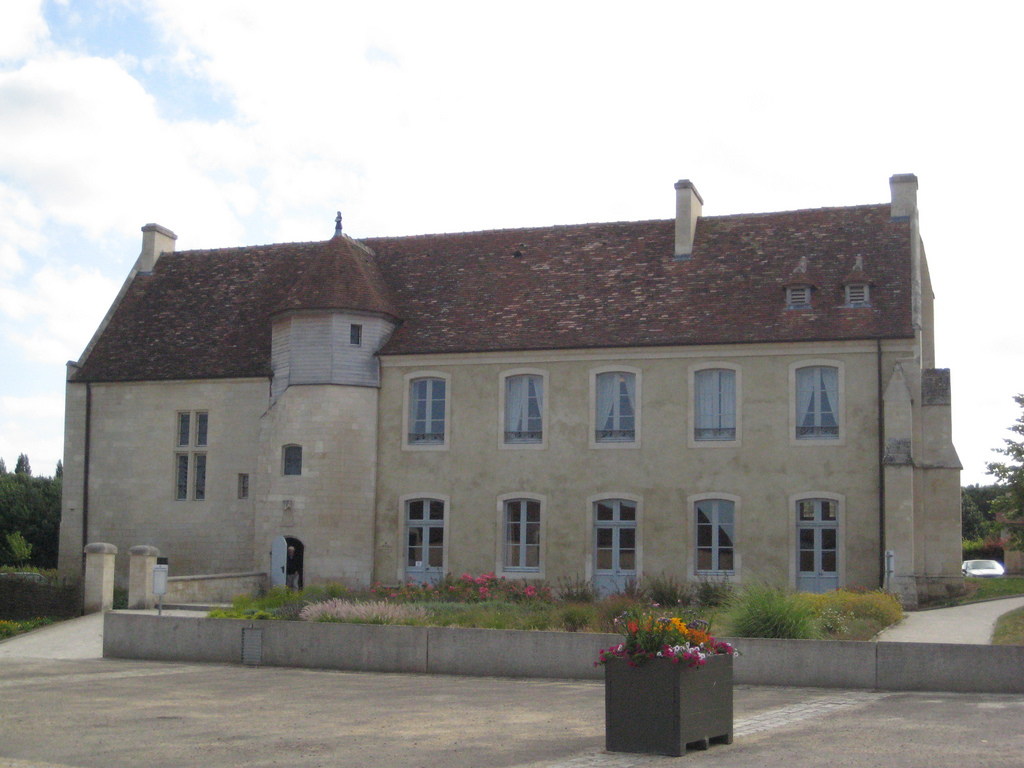
Domaine de la Baronnie in Bretteville-sur-Odon

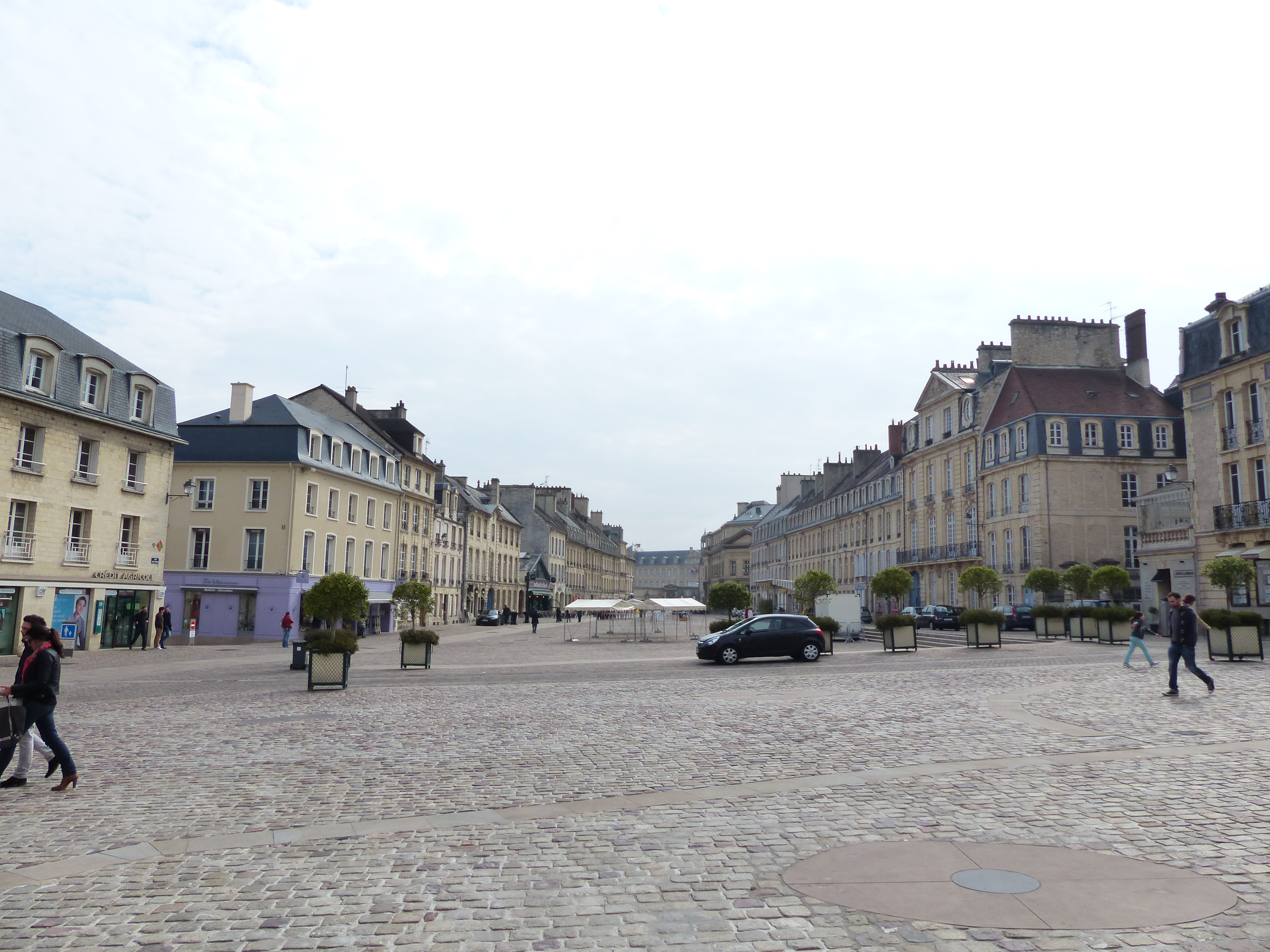
Saint-Sauveur's Square in Caen
