= Margetshöchheim (Verwaltungsgemeinschaft) =

- Verwaltungsgemeinschaft
- Location of Margetshöchheim within Würzburg district
- Interactive map of Margetshöchheim
- Location within Germany Location within Bavaria
- Coordinates: 49°50′N 9°52′E
- Country: Germany
- State: Bavaria
- Admin. region: Lower Franconia
- District: Würzburg
- Seat: Margetshöchheim
- Subdivisions: 2 municipalities

Area
  - Total: 10.68 km^{2} (4.12 sq mi)

Population (2025-12-31)
  - Total: 4,920
  - Density: 461/km^{2} (1,190/sq mi)
- Time zone: UTC+01:00 (CET)
  - Summer (DST): UTC+02:00 (CEST)

Margetshöchheim is a Verwaltungsgemeinschaft (municipal association) in the district of Würzburg in Bavaria, Germany. Its seat is in Margetshöchheim.

It consists of the following municipalities:

1. Erlabrunn
2. Margetshöchheim
