= Zellingen (Verwaltungsgemeinschaft) =

- Verwaltungsgemeinschaft
- Location of Zellingen within Main-Spessart district
- Interactive map of Zellingen
- Location within Germany Location within Bavaria
- Coordinates: 49°54′N 9°49′E
- Country: Germany
- State: Bavaria
- Admin. region: Lower Franconia
- District: Main-Spessart
- Seat: Zellingen
- Subdivisions: 4 municipalities

Area
  - Total: 96.53 km^{2} (37.27 sq mi)

Population (2025-12-31)
  - Total: 10,884
  - Density: 112.8/km^{2} (292.0/sq mi)
- Time zone: UTC+01:00 (CET)
  - Summer (DST): UTC+02:00 (CEST)
- Website: www.vgem-zellingen.info

Zellingen is a Verwaltungsgemeinschaft (municipal association) in the district Main-Spessart in Bavaria, Germany. Its seat is in Zellingen.

It consists of the following municipalities:

1. Himmelstadt
2. Retzstadt
3. Thüngen
4. Zellingen
