= Mouen =

- Commune
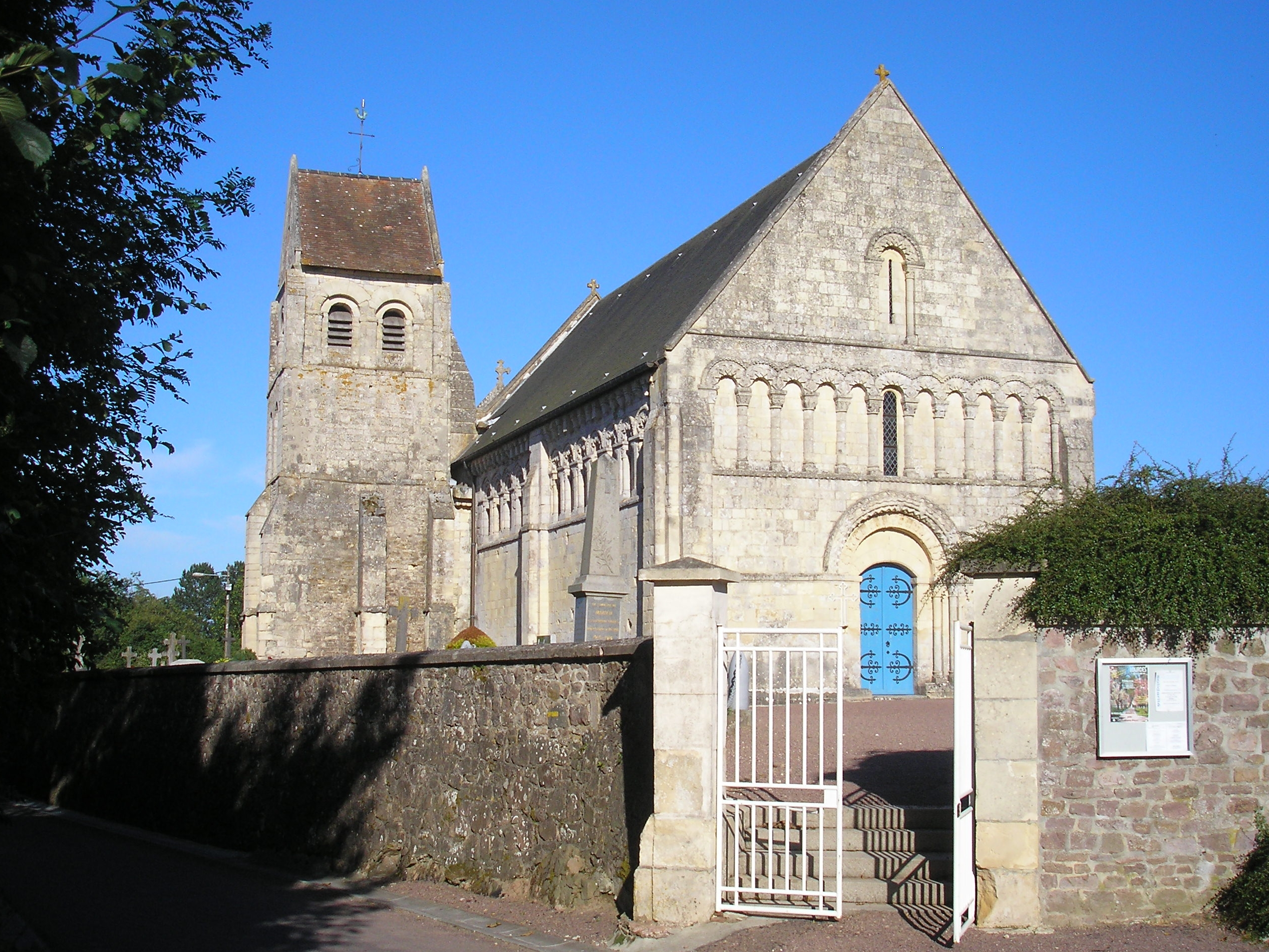
- The church in Mouen
- Location of Mouen
- Location within France Location within Normandy
- Coordinates: 49°08′56″N 0°28′57″W
- Country: France
- Region: Normandy
- Department: Calvados
- Arrondissement: Caen
- Canton: Caen-1
- Intercommunality: CU Caen la Mer

Government
  - Mayor (2020–2026): Benoît Lerévérend
- Area^{1}: 4.16 km^{2} (1.61 sq mi)
- Elevation: 77 m (253 ft)
- Highest elevation: 94 m (308 ft)
- Lowest elevation: 28 m (92 ft)
- Population (2023): 1,788
  - Density: 430/km^{2} (1,110/sq mi)
- Time zone: UTC+01:00 (CET)
  - Summer (DST): UTC+02:00 (CEST)
- INSEE/Postal code: 14454 /14790
- ^{1} French Land Register data, which excludes lakes, ponds, glaciers > 1 km^{2} (0.386 sq mi or 247 acres) and river estuaries.

Mouen (French pronunciation: [mwɑ̃]) is a commune in the Calvados department in the Normandy region in northwestern France.

== Geography ==
The commune is made up of the following collection of villages and hamlets, Le Vivier, La Bruyère, La Plauderie and Mouen.

The river Odon flows through the commune. In addition a stream the Ruisseau de Sabley traverses the commune.

== Population ==
Historical population
Year	Pop.	±% p.a.
1968	455	—
1975	736	+7.11%
1982	833	+1.78%
1990	1,166	+4.29%
1999	1,292	+1.15%
2007	1,282	−0.10%
2012	1,357	+1.14%
2017	1,601	+3.36%
2023	1,788	+1.86%
Source: INSEE

== Points of interest ==
=== National heritage sites ===
- Église Saint-Malo a church listed as a Monument historique in 1846.

== Twin towns – sister cities ==
Mouen, along with Mondrainville is twinned with:

- Retzstadt, Germany

== See also ==
- Operation Epsom
- Communes of the Calvados department
