= Bretteville-sur-Odon =

- Commune
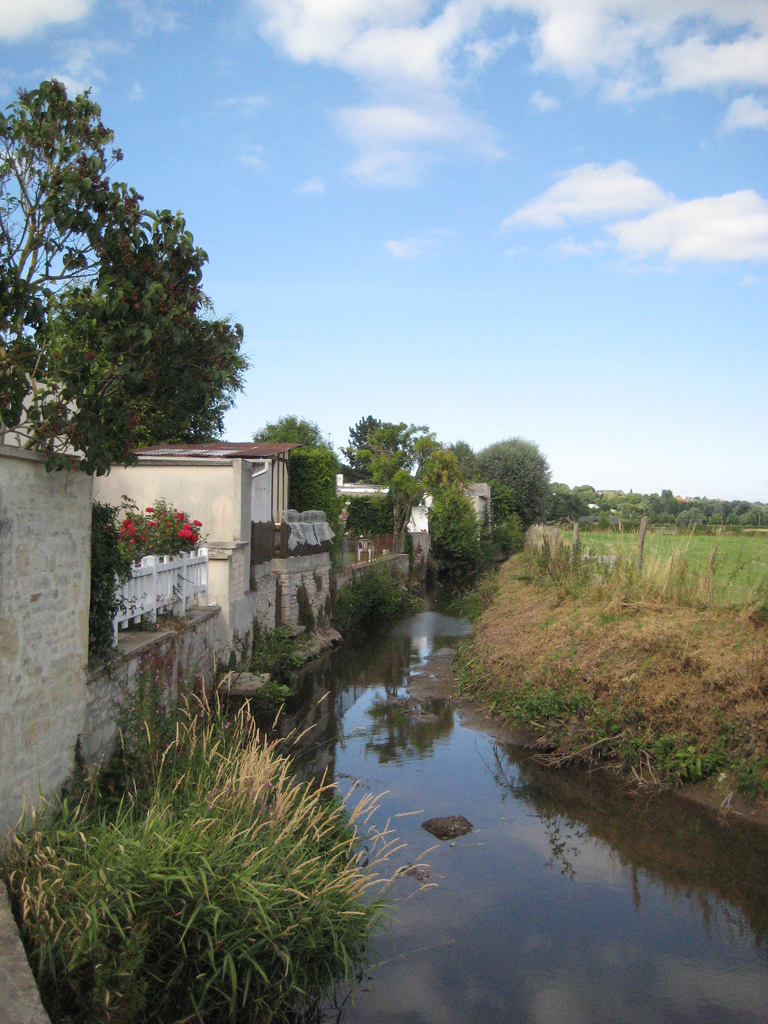
- The Odon river at Bretteville-sur-Odon

- Coat of arms
- Location of Bretteville-sur-Odon
- Location within France Location within Normandy
- Coordinates: 49°10′14″N 0°24′46″W
- Country: France
- Region: Normandy
- Department: Calvados
- Arrondissement: Caen
- Canton: Caen-1
- Intercommunality: Caen la Mer

Government
  - Mayor (2020–2026): Patrick Lecaplain
- Area^{1}: 6.46 km^{2} (2.49 sq mi)
- Elevation: 15 m (49 ft)
- Highest elevation: 72 m (236 ft)
- Lowest elevation: 5 m (16 ft)
- Population (2023): 4,494
  - Density: 696/km^{2} (1,800/sq mi)
- Time zone: UTC+01:00 (CET)
  - Summer (DST): UTC+02:00 (CEST)
- INSEE/Postal code: 14101 /14760
- ^{1} French Land Register data, which excludes lakes, ponds, glaciers > 1 km^{2} (0.386 sq mi or 247 acres) and river estuaries.

Bretteville-sur-Odon (French pronunciation: [bʁɛtvil syʁ ɔdɔ̃], literally Bretteville on Odon) is a commune in the department of Calvados in the Normandy region in northwestern France. It lies on the river Odon, about 5 km (3.1 mi) west of Caen.

== Geography ==
The commune is made up of the following collection of villages and hamlets, La Baulue and Louvigny.

The river Odon is the only watercourse to flow through the commune.

== Population ==
Historical population

Year	Pop.	±% p.a.
1793	544	—
1800	559	+0.39%
1806	618	+1.69%
1821	752	+1.32%
1831	756	+0.05%
1836	801	+1.16%
1841	804	+0.07%
1846	784	−0.50%
1851	803	+0.48%
1856	803	+0.00%
1861	817	+0.35%
1866	795	−0.54%
1872	758	−0.79%
1876	732	−0.87%
1881	737	+0.14%
1886	671	−1.86%
1891	634	−1.13%
1896	682	+1.47%
1901	556	−4.00%

Year	Pop.	±% p.a.
1906	631	+2.56%
1911	651	+0.63%
1921	660	+0.14%
1926	652	−0.24%
1931	755	+2.98%
1936	726	−0.78%
1946	760	+0.46%
1954	1,807	+11.43%
1962	1,232	−4.68%
1968	2,182	+10.00%
1975	2,466	+1.76%
1982	3,326	+4.37%
1990	3,623	+1.07%
1999	3,951	+0.97%
2007	4,105	+0.48%
2012	3,900	−1.02%
2017	3,833	−0.35%
2023	4,494	+2.69%

Source: EHESS and INSEE (1968-2023)

== Points of Interest ==
- Parc Festyland - A theme park that has been on the commune and open to the public since 1989.

=== Museums ===
- D-Day Wings Museum - museum in Normandy devoted to D-Day aircraft and air operations. The museum is based in a hangar originally built in 1937, located in a former French air base, that was used by the Luftwaffe.

=== National Heritage Sites ===
The commune has three sites listed as a Monument historique.

- Bell tower a fourteenth century Belltower, belonging to the former Church of Notre-Dame, listed as a monument in 1927.
- Former farm of the Old Bell Tower a former seventeenth century farm house, which was listed as a monument in 2004.
- Former manor of the Abbey of Mont-Saint-Michel, called the Ferme de la Baronnerie, it is a thirteenth century manor house listed as a monument in 1990.

== Twin towns – sister cities ==
Argentan is twinned with:

- Woodbury, Devon, England, United Kingdom, Since 1978
- Glattbach, Germany, since 1987
- (Senegal) Ouonck, Sénégal since 1997

== See also ==
- Communes of the Calvados department
