= Zoo de Jurques =

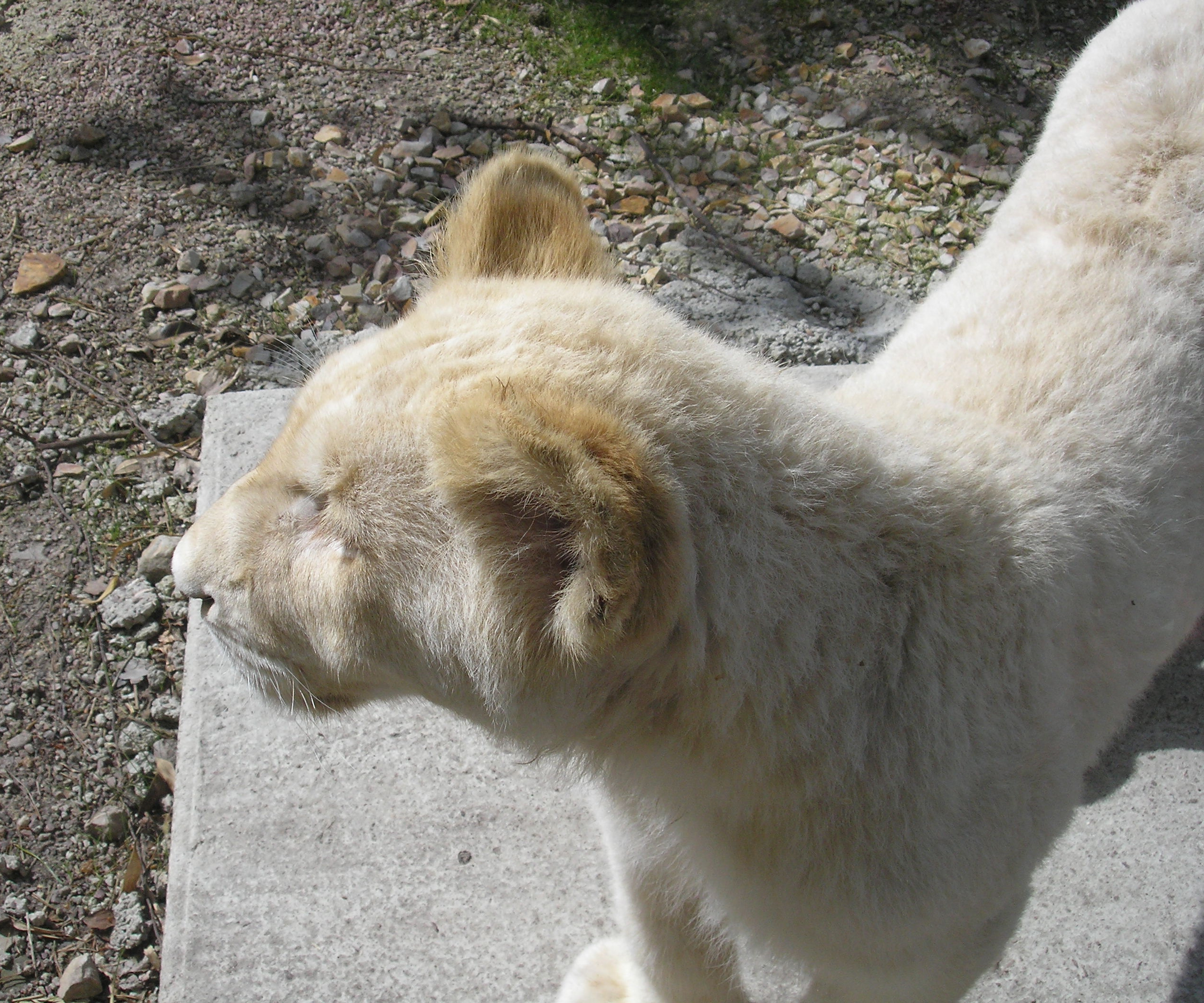
- White Lion cub born at the zoo
- Interactive map of Zoo de Jurques
- 49°00′12.168″N 0°45′9.648″W
- Date opened: 1977
- Date opening: 49.00338176476665, -0.7526846108877143
- Location: Dialan sur Chaîne, France
- Land area: 21 hectares
- No. of animals: 600
- No. of species: 115 (2024)
- Annual visitors: 110,000
- Memberships: European Association of Zoos and Aquaria (EAZA) & The French Association of Zoological Parks (AFdPZ)
- Website: www.zoodejurques.fr

Zoo de Jurques is a zoological park in the commune of Dialan sur Chaîne.

The park covers an area of 15 hectares (37 acres). It is home to about 700 animals, and features around 115 species.

The Park is open from February to November. It receives approximately 110,000 visitors per year.

== History ==
In the 1960's Auguste Ourry a breeder of ornamental poultry in Lessay, decided to open a zoo, Lessay zoo. The zoo at Lessay was becoming too small so Auguste looked for a new site, decided to purchase the current site, which was occupied by Parc Festyland at the time and in 1977 opened the current zoo.

== Membership ==
The park is one of the members of The French Association of Zoological Parks (AFdPZ) and the European Association of Zoos and Aquaria EAZA.
