= Mondrainville =

- Commune
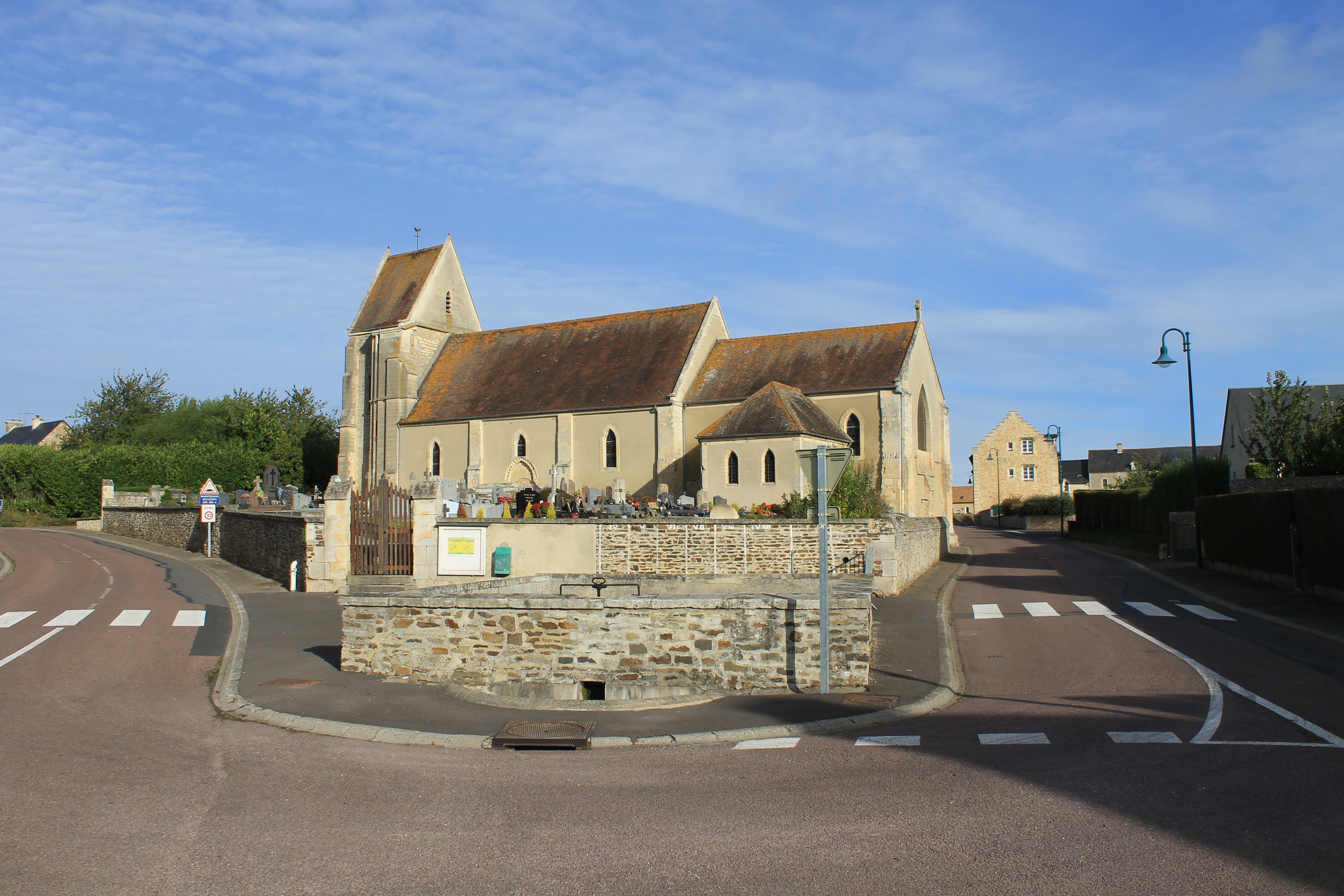
- The church in Mondrainville
- Location of Mondrainville
- Location within France Location within Normandy
- Coordinates: 49°08′22″N 0°30′57″W
- Country: France
- Region: Normandy
- Department: Calvados
- Arrondissement: Caen
- Canton: Évrecy
- Intercommunality: Vallées de l'Orne et de l'Odon

Government
  - Mayor (2020–2026): Edith Godier
- Area^{1}: 3.17 km^{2} (1.22 sq mi)
- Elevation: 120 m (390 ft)
- Highest elevation: 104 m (341 ft)
- Lowest elevation: 43 m (141 ft)
- Population (2023): 594
  - Density: 187/km^{2} (485/sq mi)
- Time zone: UTC+01:00 (CET)
  - Summer (DST): UTC+02:00 (CEST)
- INSEE/Postal code: 14438 /14210
- ^{1} French Land Register data, which excludes lakes, ponds, glaciers > 1 km^{2} (0.386 sq mi or 247 acres) and river estuaries.

Mondrainville (French pronunciation: [mɔ̃dʁɛ̃vil]) is a commune in the Calvados department in the Normandy région in northwestern France.

== Geography ==
The commune is made up of the following collection of villages and hamlets, Colleville and Mondrainville.

The river Odon flows through the commune. In addition a stream the Ruisseau de Sabley traverses the commune.

== Population ==
Historical population
Year	Pop.	±% p.a.
1968	120	—
1975	144	+2.64%
1982	228	+6.79%
1990	315	+4.12%
1999	409	+2.94%
2007	445	+1.06%
2012	500	+2.36%
2017	521	+0.83%
2023	594	+2.21%
Source: INSEE

== Points of interest ==
- Sentier nature du bois des Amis de Jean Bosco a 81 hectares (200 acres) area of wooded land and humid areas used for walking.

=== National heritage sites ===
- Eglise Saint-Denis a thirteenth century church listed as a Monument historique in 1932.

== Twin towns – sister cities ==
Mondrainville, along with Mouen is twinned with:

- Retzstadt, Germany

== See also ==
- Communes of the Calvados department
