= Margetshöchheim =

- Municipality
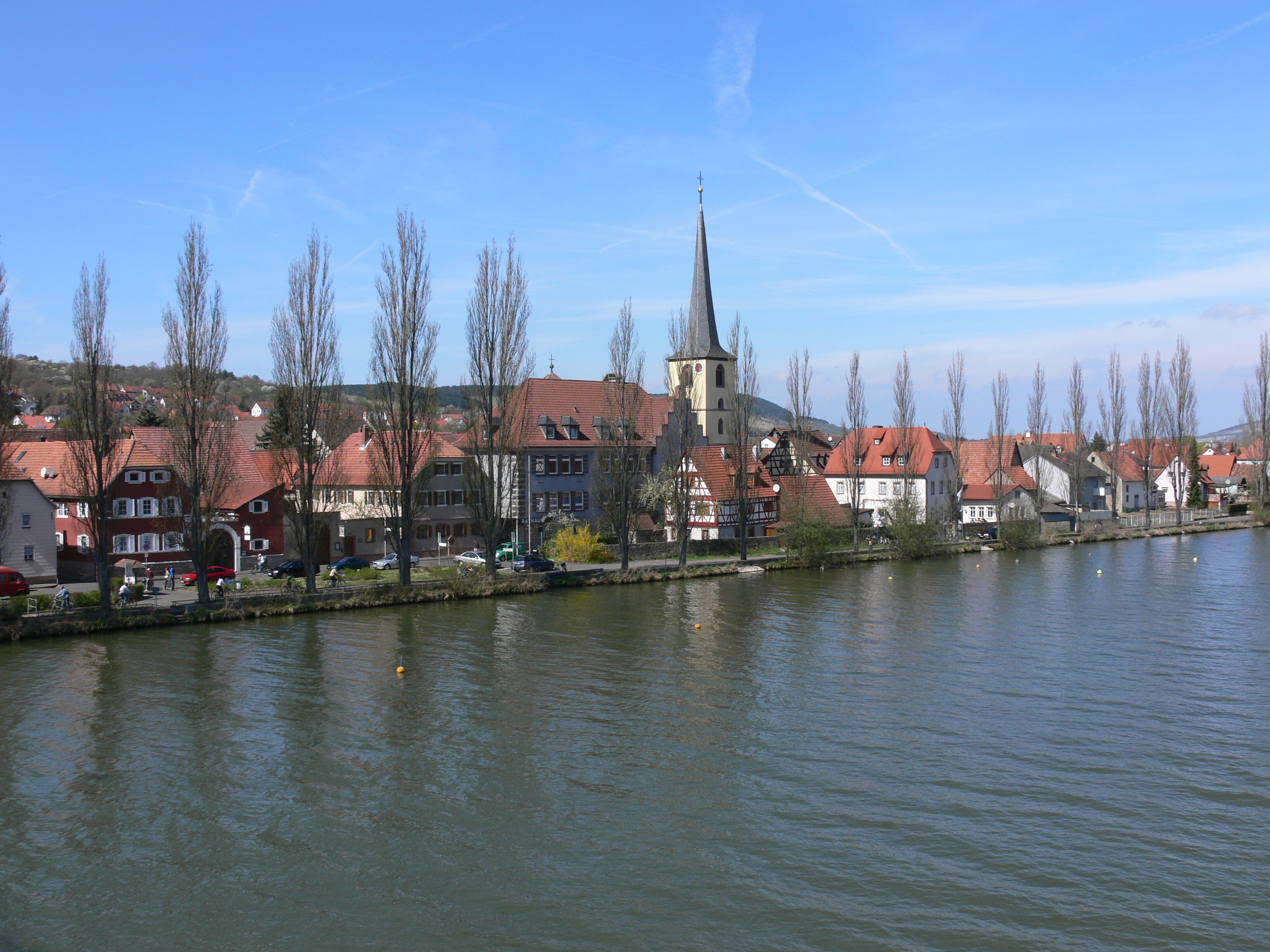
- Margetshöchheim seen from the Main River

- Coat of arms

- Location of Margetshöchheim within Würzburg district
- Interactive map of Margetshöchheim
- Location within Germany Location within Bavaria
- Coordinates: 49°50′N 9°51′E
- Country: Germany
- State: Bavaria
- Admin. region: Unterfranken
- District: Würzburg
- Municipal assoc.: Margetshöchheim

Government
  - Mayor (2020–26): Waldemar Brohm (CSU)

Area
  - Total: 6.67 km^{2} (2.58 sq mi)
- Elevation: 170 m (560 ft)

Population (2025-12-31)
  - Total: 3,085
  - Density: 463/km^{2} (1,200/sq mi)
- Time zone: UTC+01:00 (CET)
  - Summer (DST): UTC+02:00 (CEST)
- Postal codes: 97276
- Dialling codes: 0931
- Vehicle registration: WÜ
- Website: www.margetshoechheim.de

Margetshöchheim is a municipality in the district of Würzburg in Bavaria, Germany. It lies on the left bank of the river Main.
