= Himmelstadt =

- Municipality
- Coat of arms

- Location of Himmelstadt within Main-Spessart district
- Interactive map of Himmelstadt
- Location within Germany Location within Bavaria
- Coordinates: 49°55′N 9°48′E
- Country: Germany
- State: Bavaria
- Admin. region: Unterfranken
- District: Main-Spessart
- Municipal assoc.: Zellingen

Government
  - Mayor (2018–24): Herbert Hemmelmann (CSU)

Area
  - Total: 13.42 km^{2} (5.18 sq mi)
- Elevation: 165 m (541 ft)

Population (2025-12-31)
  - Total: 1,601
  - Density: 119.3/km^{2} (309.0/sq mi)
- Time zone: UTC+01:00 (CET)
  - Summer (DST): UTC+02:00 (CEST)
- Postal codes: 97267
- Dialling codes: 09364
- Vehicle registration: MSP
- Website: www.himmelstadt.de

Himmelstadt is a municipality in the Main-Spessart district in the Regierungsbezirk of Lower Franconia (Unterfranken) in Bavaria, Germany and a member of the Verwaltungsgemeinschaft (Administrative Community) of Zellingen.

Because of the community’s “heavenly” name – Himmel means “heaven” or “sky” in German – the Weihnachtspostamt Himmelstadt (“Himmelstadt Christmas Post Office”) has existed since 1986, jointly run by Deutsche Post and the community.

== Geography ==
=== Location ===
Himmelstadt lies in the Würzburg Region.

The community has only one Gemarkung (traditional rural cadastral area), also called Himmelstadt.

== History ==
The community was founded by a woman named Immina. After she died in 741, ownership passed to Bishop Burchard of Würzburg. In 840, the community had its first documentary mention as Immestat. The Himmelspforten (“Heaven’s Gates”) Convent (not to be confused with the religious houses named Himmelpforten, without an ⟨s⟩, in Hamburg and the Harz) was founded in Himmelstadt by Bishop Hermann I of Lobdeburg, but in 1253 it was moved to Himmelspforten near Würzburg. The convent, however, kept its economic holdings in Himmelstadt right up until Secularization in 1803. As part of the Prince-Bishopric of Würzburg, Himmelstadt was secularized in 1803, and then in the Peace of Pressburg in 1805 passed to Archduke Ferdinand of Tuscany to form the Grand Duchy of Würzburg, with which it passed in 1814 to Bavaria.

=== Population development ===
Within town limits, 1,425 inhabitants were counted in 1970, 1,558 in 1987 and in 2000 1,752.

== Politics ==
The mayor is Herbert Hemmelmann, elected in 2018.

Municipal taxes in 1999 amounted to €2,520,000 (converted), of which net business taxes amounted to €457,000.

=== Coat of arms ===
The community’s arms might be described thus: Argent a fess wavy azure surmounting the main stem of a twig of three roses gules in pale, in base the letters H and P ligatured of the last.

The tinctures argent and gules (silver and red) recall Himmelstadt’s long history as a Würzburg holding. The ligatured HP is a monogram used by the Himmelspforten Cistercian Convent to mark its estate. It can still be found on old boundary stones. The rose twig comes from the convent’s seal and is a Marian motif referring thereto. The wavy blue fess stands for Himmelstadt’s location on both sides of the Main.

The arms have been borne since 1975. .

== Economy and infrastructure ==
According to official statistics, there were 37 workers on the social welfare contribution rolls working in agriculture and forestry in 1998. In producing businesses this was 592, and in trade and transport 122. In other areas, 1,016 workers on the social welfare contribution rolls were employed, and 1,684 such workers worked from home. There was one processing business. Nine businesses were in construction, and furthermore, in 1999, there were 103 agricultural operations with a working area of 2 104 ha.

=== Education ===
In 1999 the following institutions existed in Himmelstadt:

- Kindergartens: 75 places with 78 children
- Primary schools: 1 with 6 teachers and 96 pupils
