= Dialan sur Chaîne =

Commune in Calvados, Normandy, France

- Commune
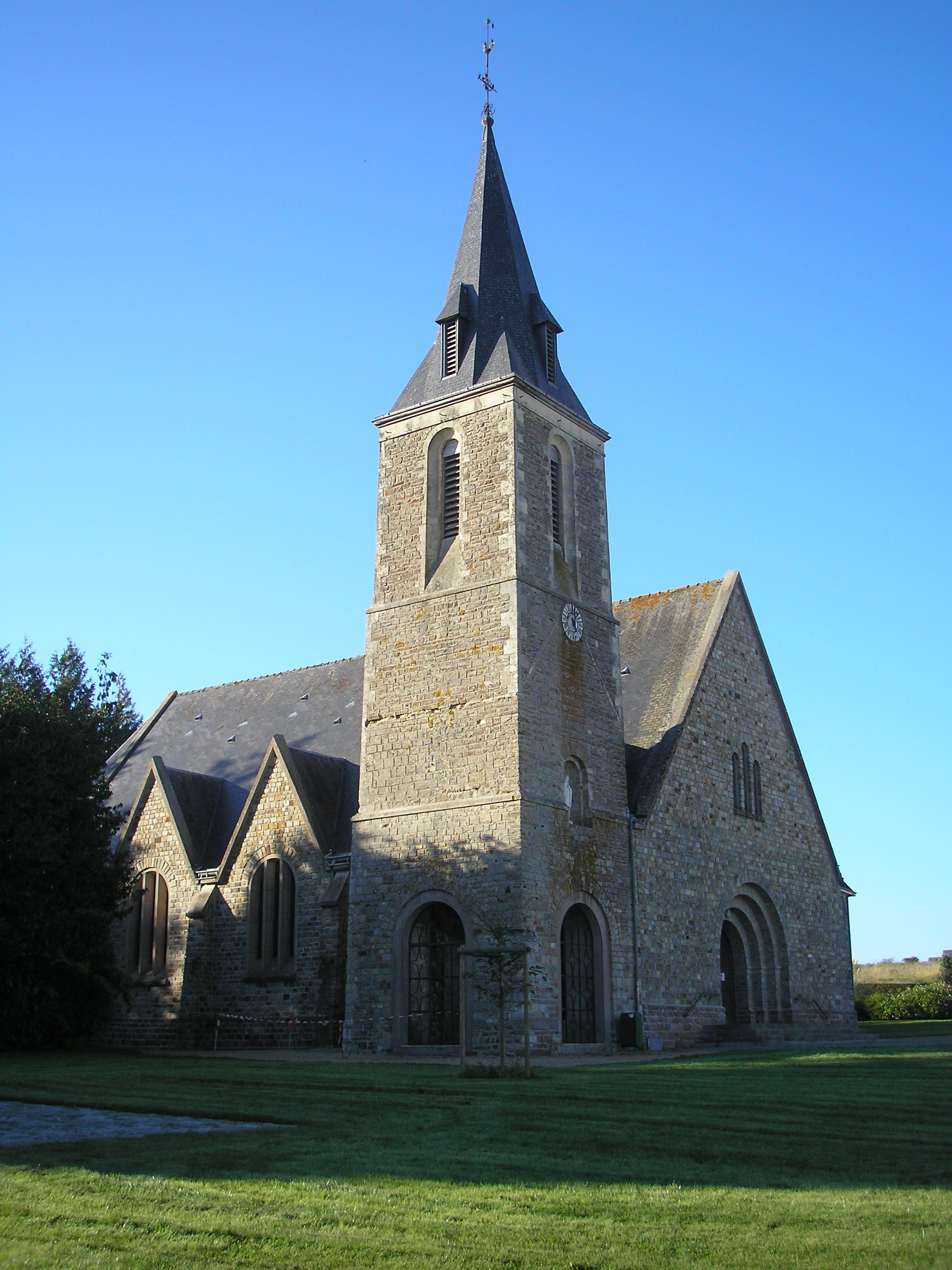
- The church in Jurques
- Location of Dialan sur Chaîne
- Location within France Location within Normandy
- Coordinates: 49°01′05″N 0°44′35″W
- Country: France
- Region: Normandy
- Department: Calvados
- Arrondissement: Vire
- Canton: Les Monts d'Aunay
- Intercommunality: Pré-Bocage Intercom
- Area^{1}: 21.93 km^{2} (8.47 sq mi)
- Population (2023): 1,006
  - Density: 45.87/km^{2} (118.8/sq mi)
- Time zone: UTC+01:00 (CET)
  - Summer (DST): UTC+02:00 (CEST)
- INSEE/Postal code: 14347 /14260
- ^{1} French Land Register data, which excludes lakes, ponds, glaciers > 1 km^{2} (0.386 sq mi or 247 acres) and river estuaries.

Dialan sur Chaîne (French pronunciation: [djalɑ̃ syʁ ʃɛːn]) is a commune in the department of Calvados, northwestern France. The municipality was established on 1 January 2017 by merger of the former communes of Jurques (the seat) and Le Mesnil-Auzouf.

== Geography ==
The commune is made up of the following collection of villages and hamlets, Migny, La Sauvegarde, Le Parquet, Jurques, Montpied, La Hyguière, La Pelbouquière, Le Mesnil-Auzouf and La Fausillière.

The river Odon and the river Seulles flow through the commune.

The Commune along with another nine communes shares part of a 5,729 hectare, Natura 2000 conservation area, called the Bassin de la Druance. The commune also has another Natura 2000 conservation area, Bassin de la Souleuvre, a 2,232 hectare area which is shared with three other communes, Valdallière, Souleuvre en Bocage and Brémoy.

== Points of interest ==
- Zoo de Jurques is a zoo covering 15 hectares that was established in 1977. The zoo has over 700 animals.

=== National heritage sites ===
- Dolmen dit Pierre Dialan is a Neolithic dolmen that was classed as a Monument historique in 1889.

== See also ==
- Communes of the Calvados department
