= Retzstadt =

- Municipality
- Coat of arms

- Location of Retzstadt within Main-Spessart district
- Interactive map of Retzstadt
- Location within Germany Location within Bavaria
- Coordinates: 49°55′N 9°53′E
- Country: Germany
- State: Bavaria
- Admin. region: Unterfranken
- District: Main-Spessart
- Municipal assoc.: Zellingen

Government
  - Mayor (2020–26): Karl Gerhard

Area
  - Total: 18.08 km^{2} (6.98 sq mi)
- Elevation: 240 m (790 ft)

Population (2025-12-31)
  - Total: 1,675
  - Density: 92.64/km^{2} (239.9/sq mi)
- Time zone: UTC+01:00 (CET)
  - Summer (DST): UTC+02:00 (CEST)
- Postal codes: 97282
- Dialling codes: 09364
- Vehicle registration: MSP
- Website: www.retzstadt.de

Retzstadt (German pronunciation: [ˈʁɛtsˌʃtat]) is a municipality in the Main-Spessart district in the Regierungsbezirk of Lower Franconia (Unterfranken) in Bavaria, Germany and a member of the Verwaltungsgemeinschaft (Administrative Community) of Zellingen.

== Geography ==
=== Location ===
Retzstadt lies in the Main-Spessart district in a side-valley of the Main, on the river Retz.

The community has only the Gemarkung (traditional rural cadastral area) of Retzstadt.

== History ==
Reccisstadt had its first documentary mention in the mid 8th century. Retzstadt was, as part of the Princely Electorate (Hochstift) of Würzburg (Cathedral chapter) in Bavaria's favour secularized and passed in the Peace of Pressburg in 1805 to Archduke Ferdinand of Tuscany to form the Grand Duchy of Würzburg, with which it passed in 1814 to Bavaria.

== Politics ==
=== Mayors ===
The current mayor is Karl Gerhard (CSU). Among former mayors are:

- Siegfried Schmitt (Christliche Freie Wähler, 2002–2008)
- Reinhold H. Möller (CSU/Unabhängige Wählergruppe, 1984 – 2002).

Municipal taxes in 1999 amounted to €572,000 (converted), of which net business taxes amounted to €66,000.

=== Town partnerships ===
Retzstadt is twinned with:

- Mouen, Calvados, France since 1990
- Mondrainville, Calvados, France since 1990

=== Coat of arms ===
The community's arms might be described thus: Azure a winepress argent, in a base of the second a saltire gules.

The winepress in the arms refers to Retzstadt's winegrowing and winemaking. The saltire (X-shaped cross) is Saint Andrew’s attribute, and it is to him that the church from 1726 is consecrated. The tinctures argent and gules (silver and red) recall the centuries during which the Prince-Bishopric (Hochstift) of Würzburg held sway in the area.

The arms have been borne since 1970.

== Sightseeing ==
- Parish church, built by Balthasar Neumann

== Economy and infrastructure ==
According to official statistics, there were 22 workers on the social welfare contribution rolls working in producing businesses in 1998. In trade and transport this was 7. In other areas, 18 workers on the social welfare contribution rolls were employed, and 600 such workers worked from home. There were 10 processing businesses. No businesses were in construction, and furthermore, in 1999, there were 71 agricultural operations with a working area of 1 378 ha, of which 1 172 ha was cropland and 142 ha was meadowland. On an area of more than 80 ha, there is winegrowing.

In 2000, Retzstadt was, as “Teledorf Retzstadt” one of Expo 2000’s 19 outlying projects in Bavaria. Retzstadt was a model community for the use of information and communication technology for developing the rural area.

=== Education ===
In 1999 the following institutions existed in Retzstadt:

- Kindergarten: 50 places with 51 children
- Primary schools: 1 with 4 teachers and 102 pupils
