= Zellingen =

- Municipality
- Coat of arms

- Location of Zellingen within Main-Spessart district
- Interactive map of Zellingen
- Location within Germany Location within Bavaria
- Coordinates: 49°54′N 9°49′E
- Country: Germany
- State: Bavaria
- Admin. region: Unterfranken
- District: Main-Spessart
- Municipal assoc.: Zellingen

Government
  - Mayor (2020–26): Stefan Wohlfart (CSU)

Area
  - Total: 41.44 km^{2} (16.00 sq mi)
- Elevation: 162–204 m (531–669 ft)

Population (2025-12-31)
  - Total: 6,343
  - Density: 153.1/km^{2} (396.4/sq mi)
- Time zone: UTC+01:00 (CET)
  - Summer (DST): UTC+02:00 (CEST)
- Postal codes: 97225
- Dialling codes: 09364
- Vehicle registration: MSP
- Website: www.zellingen.de

Zellingen (German pronunciation: [ˈtsɛlɪŋən]) is a market municipality in the Main-Spessart district in the Regierungsbezirk of Lower Franconia (Unterfranken) in Bavaria, Germany and the seat of the Verwaltungsgemeinschaft (Administrative Community) of Zellingen.

== Geography ==
=== Location ===
Zellingen lies in the region of Würzburg on the river Main. The community has the following Gemarkungen (traditional rural cadastral areas): Duttenbrunn, Retzbach, Zellingen.

== History ==
Between 1312 and 1313, Zellingen temporarily had Schweinfurt town rights, which, however, were never used.

Zellingen, as a former Amt of the Prince-Bishopric of Würzburg, passed at Secularization in 1803 to Bavaria, and under the Peace of Pressburg was transferred in 1805 to Archduke Ferdinand of Tuscany to form the Grand Duchy of Würzburg, with which it passed in 1814 back to Bavaria. In 1975, the market community of Retzbach was amalgamated with Zellingen, as likewise was the community of Duttenbrunn in 1978.

Historical population
Year	Pop.	±%
1970	5,451	—
1987	5,651	+3.7%
2000	6,514	+15.3%
2005	6,585	+1.1%
Inhabitants within Zellingen community limits

== Politics ==
=== Mayors ===
List of successive mayors
Term	Name	Party
1972–1990	Valentin Bauer	CSU
1990–1996	Bernd Oestemer	SPD
1996–2008	Karl Mühlbauer	CSU
2008–2020	Dr. Wieland Gsell	Greens
2020–incumbent	Stefan Wohlfart	CSU

Dr. Wieland Gsell, as mayoral candidate for the Greens, won in the runoff election on 16 March 2008 with 51.1% of the vote, beating the incumbent CSU candidate Karl Mühlbauer. Gsell was reelected in 2014. In March 2020 Stefan Wohlfart (CSU) was elected mayor.

Municipal taxes in 1999 amounted to €2,706,000 (converted), of which net business taxes amounted to €395,000.

=== Town partnerships ===
- (Germany) Geyer, Erzgebirgskreis, Saxony since 1990
- Louvigny, Calvados, France since 1984
- (Germany) Tiefenbach, Passau, Bavaria since 1974

=== Coat of arms ===
The community's arms might be described thus: Per fess, in chief argent the letter Z moline gules, in base per pale, dexter dancetty of three of the second and first, sinister azure a bend of the first surmounted by three annulets of the field in bend.

The red Z was taken from Zellingen's old court seal, which is known from a print made in 1691. The two designs in the escutcheon's lower half are drawn from arms formerly borne by the old community of Retzbach and granted by Prince-Bishop of Würzburg Julius Echter von Mespelbrunn (1573–1617) in 1586. The design on the sinister (armsbearer's left, viewer's right) side with the bend (diagonal stripe) overlaid with three rings was the Prince-Bishop's personal arms. Together with the design on the dexter (armsbearer's right, viewer's left) side, the three silver points on red, known as the "Franconian rake", the arms refer to the community's former lords.

The arms have been borne since 1982.

Another source shows quite a different coat of arms, which might be blazoned thus: Gules Saint George in armour azure on a horse springing argent thrusting a lance Or into a dragon's mouth and through its throat, the dragon in base of the third and supine, in chief sinister an inescutcheon of the third with the letter Z moline of the field.

Saints George and Sebastian are the community's patron saints; even the two kindergartens are named for them.

== Economy and infrastructure ==
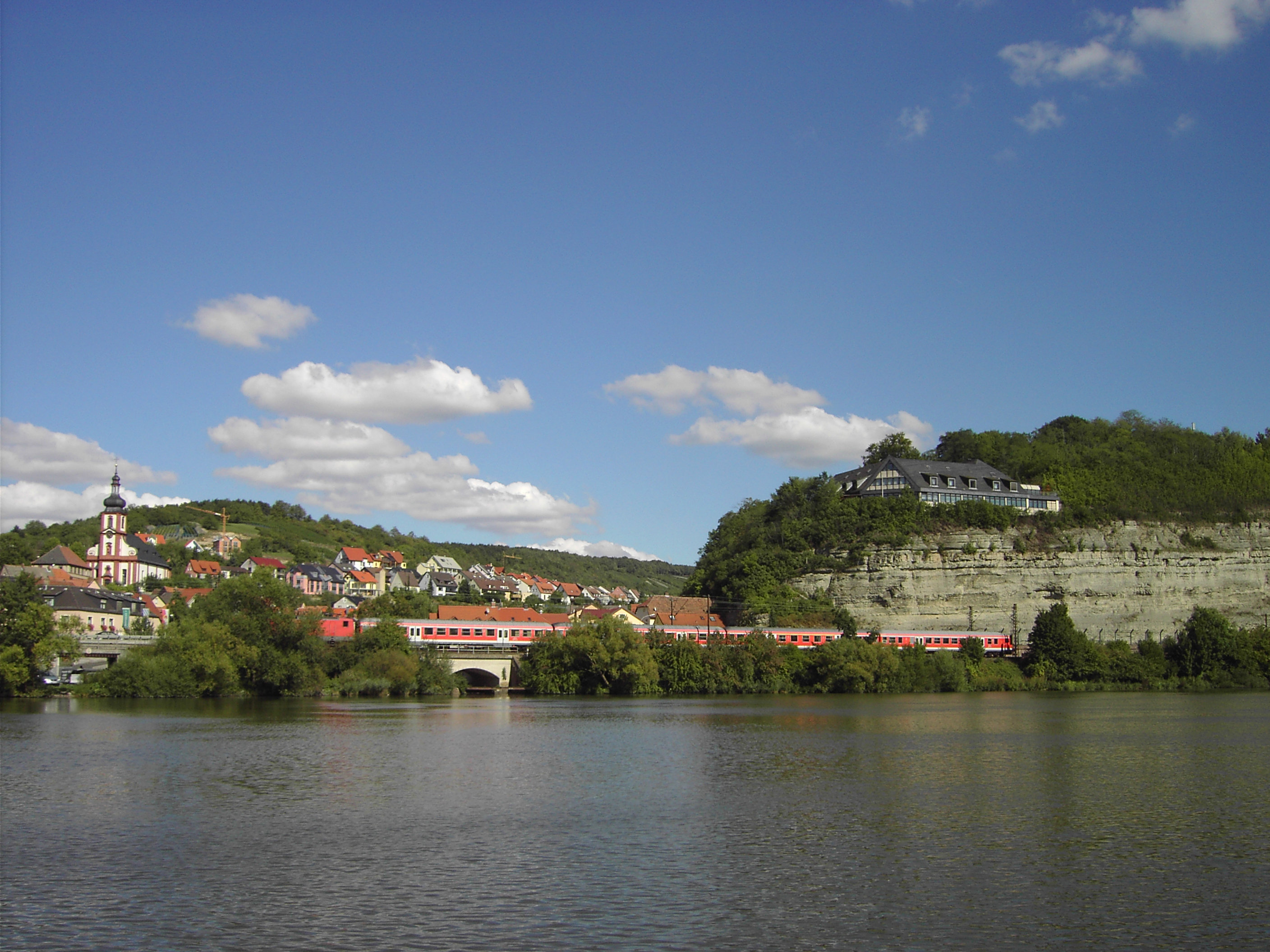
Retzbach from Zellingen (southwest)

According to official statistics, there were 264 workers on the social welfare contribution rolls working in producing businesses in 1998. In trade and transport this was 0. In other areas, 358 workers on the social welfare contribution rolls were employed, and 2,199 such workers worked from home. There were 0 processing businesses. Four businesses were in construction, and furthermore, in 1999, there were 111 agricultural operations with a working area of 1 212 ha, of which 1 102 ha was cropland and 52 ha was meadowland.

=== Transport ===
The Hanover-Würzburg high-speed rail line crosses through the market community's municipal area, going through the Hohe-Wart-Tunnel and across the Bartelsgrabentalbrücke, a 1 160 m-long bridge.

=== Religion ===
In Zellingen stand the following houses of worship:

- Saint George's Parish Church (Pfarrkirche Sankt Georg), formerly a castle belonging to the Prince-Bishop of Greiffenklau
- Maria Hilf Kapelle (chapel) with candleholder by the Scapular Confraternity
- Saint Theresa's Hall Chapel (Flurkapelle Sankt Therese) on the Kirchberg

=== Education ===
In 1999 the following institutions existed in Zellingen:

- Kindergartens: 300 places with 268 children
- Primary schools: 2 with 35 teachers and 701 pupils

== Soccer Team ==
FSV Zellingen is a German Soccer team based in Zellingen, Bavaria. The team plays in the Kreisklasse Würzburg group 1, from the Bavarian football league system.

=== History ===
Since 1928, the team has competed under the name Zellingen. In 1938 the Soccer team joined the FV Zellingen (back then TG Zellingen). During this time, they haven't played as much because of the impact of World War II. That's when a few players from the team created their own association, the FSV Zellingen.

=== Soccer pitch ===
The soccer pitch, located at Oberbachring 9 in Zellingen, was constructed between 1978 and 2004.

=== Teams ===
FSV Zellingen consists of 13 teams, including a women's team founded in 2021. In 2022 the club joined together with TSV Retzbach.
