= Ifs, Calvados =

Ifs
- Commune
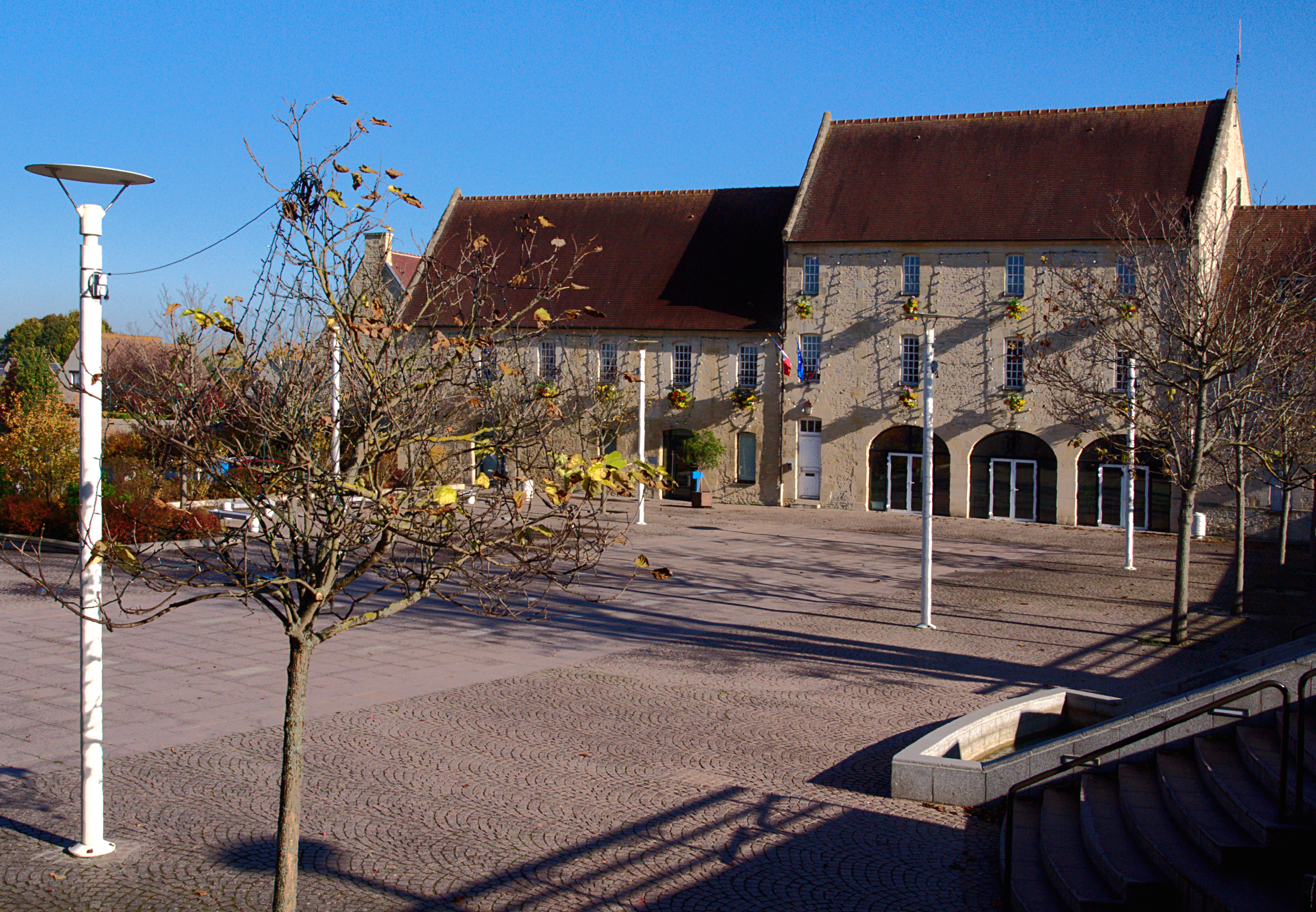
- Town Hall
- Location of Ifs
- Location within France Location within Normandy
- Coordinates: 49°08′20″N 0°21′07″W
- Country: France
- Region: Normandy
- Department: Calvados
- Arrondissement: Caen
- Canton: Ifs
- Intercommunality: Caen la Mer

Government
  - Mayor (2020–2026): Michel Patard-Legendre
- Area^{1}: 9.06 km^{2} (3.50 sq mi)
- Elevation: 50 m (160 ft)
- Highest elevation: 61 m (200 ft)
- Lowest elevation: 19 m (62 ft)
- Population (2023): 11,937
  - Density: 1,320/km^{2} (3,410/sq mi)
- Time zone: UTC+01:00 (CET)
  - Summer (DST): UTC+02:00 (CEST)
- INSEE/Postal code: 14341 /14123
- ^{1} French Land Register data, which excludes lakes, ponds, glaciers > 1 km^{2} (0.386 sq mi or 247 acres) and river estuaries.

Ifs (French pronunciation: [if]) is a commune in the Calvados department in the Normandy region in northwestern France.

== Geography ==
The commune is made up of the following collection of villages and hamlets, La Dronnière and Ifs.

== Population ==
Historical population
| Year | Pop. | ±% p.a. |
|---|---|---|
| 1968 | 2,681 | — |
| 1975 | 4,574 | +7.93% |
| 1982 | 5,635 | +3.02% |
| 1990 | 6,974 | +2.70% |
| 1999 | 9,208 | +3.14% |
| 2007 | 10,738 | +1.94% |
| 2012 | 11,450 | +1.29% |
| 2017 | 11,766 | +0.55% |
| 2023 | 11,937 | +0.24% |
Source: INSEE

== Administration ==
=== Mayors of Ifs ===
| From | To | Name | Party |
|---|---|---|---|
| 2001 | 2008 | Raymond Slama | PS |
| 2008 | 2014 | Jean-Paul Gauchard | DVG |
| 2014 | Current | Michel Patard-Legendre | LR |

== Points of Interest ==
- Forêt d'Ifs - A 32 hectare forest containing 40,000 trees. It also contains a marker showing the geographic centre of Calvados.

=== National Heritage sites ===
The Commune has two buildings and areas listed as a Monument historique

- Eglise Saint-André twelfth century church listed as a monument in 1946.
- Saint-Bernard Farm a seventeenth former farmhouse that was purchased by the municipal in 1972 and became the Town hall. The building was classed as a Monument historique in 1979.

== Sport ==
The commune has a football club Association sportive d'Ifs who play at the Stade Pierre-Mendès-France stadium.

== Twin towns – sister cities ==
Ifs is twinned with:

- Ilfracombe, Devon, England. Since 1991
- Niederwerrn, Germany. Since 1992
- Debar, North Macedonia. Since 2009

== Notable people ==
- Robert Tournières (1668-1752), portrait painter, pupil of Hyacinthe Rigaud was born here.
- Jean-Pascal Zadi (b. 1980), director, actor and rapper was raised here as a child.
- Sabine Devieilhe (b. 1985), operatic soprano was born here.

== See also ==
- Communes of the Calvados department
