= Canton of Ifs =

Coordinates: 49.14°N 0.35°W

Ifs
- Canton
- Interactive map of Ifs
- Country: France
- Region: Normandy
- Department: Calvados
- No. of communes: {{{nbcomm}}}

Government
  - Representatives (2021–2028): Édithe Heuzé; Joël Jeanne
- Area: 26.59 km^{2} (10.27 sq mi)
- Population (2023): 32,722
  - Density: 1,231/km^{2} (3,187/sq mi)
- INSEE code: 14 16

The canton of Ifs is an administrative division of the Calvados department, northwestern France. It was created at the French canton reorganisation which came into effect in March 2015. Its seat is in Ifs.

== Composition ==
It consists of the following communes:

1. Cormelles-le-Royal
2. Giberville
3. Ifs
4. Mondeville

== Councillors ==
Election	Councillors	Party	Occupation
2015	Édithe Guillot	PS	Councillor of Giberville
2015	Bertrand Havard	PS	Councillor of Mondeville

== Pictures of the canton ==
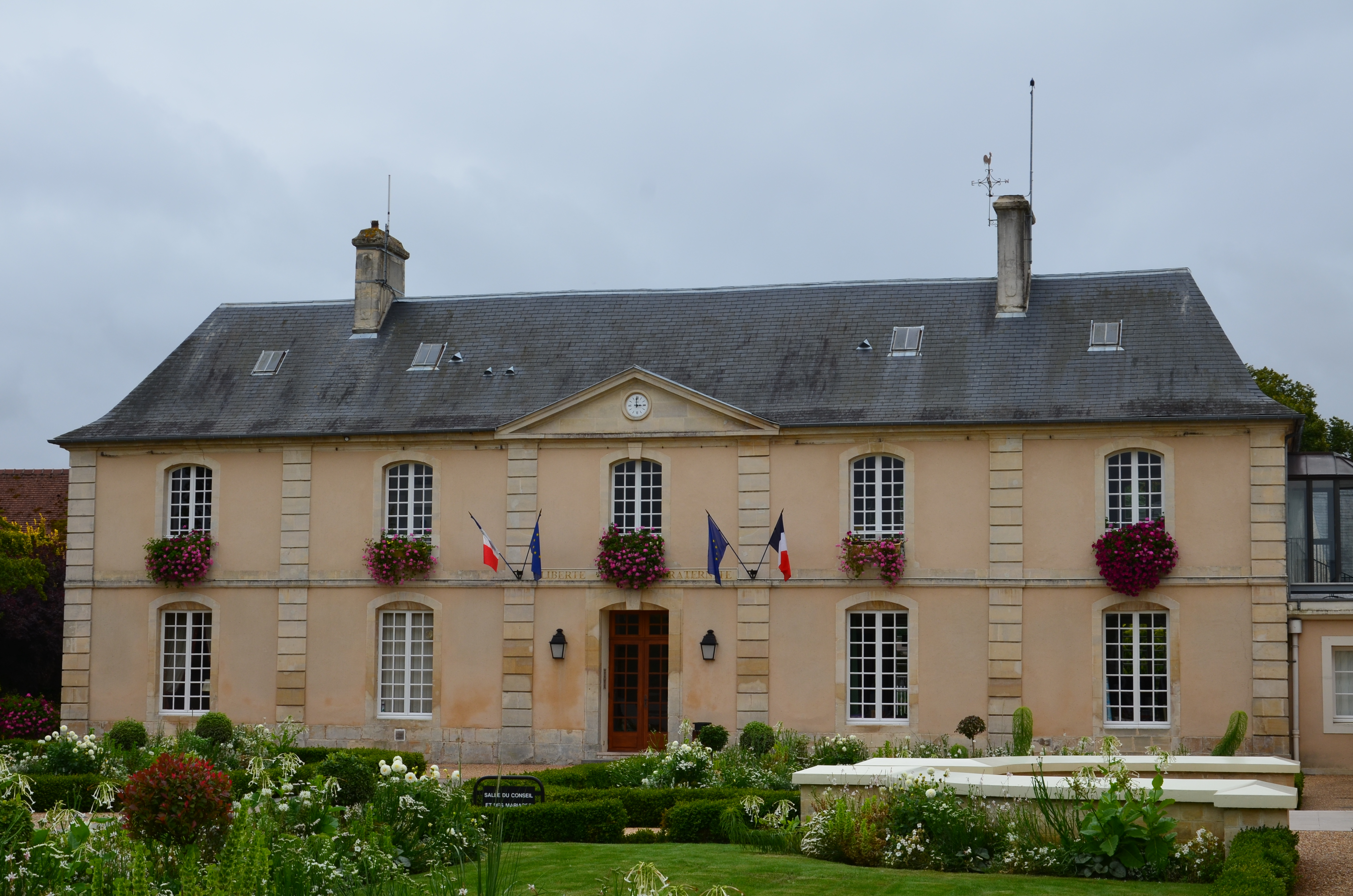
seat hall of Cormelles-le-Royal

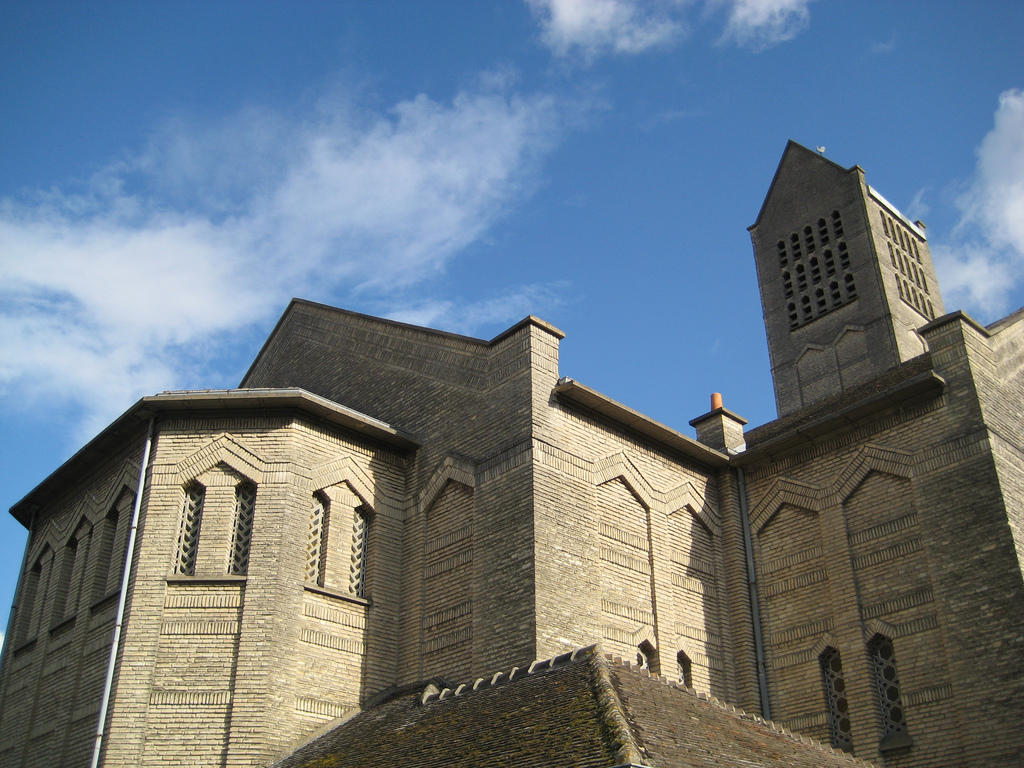
Church in Mondeville
