= Cormelles-le-Royal =

- Commune
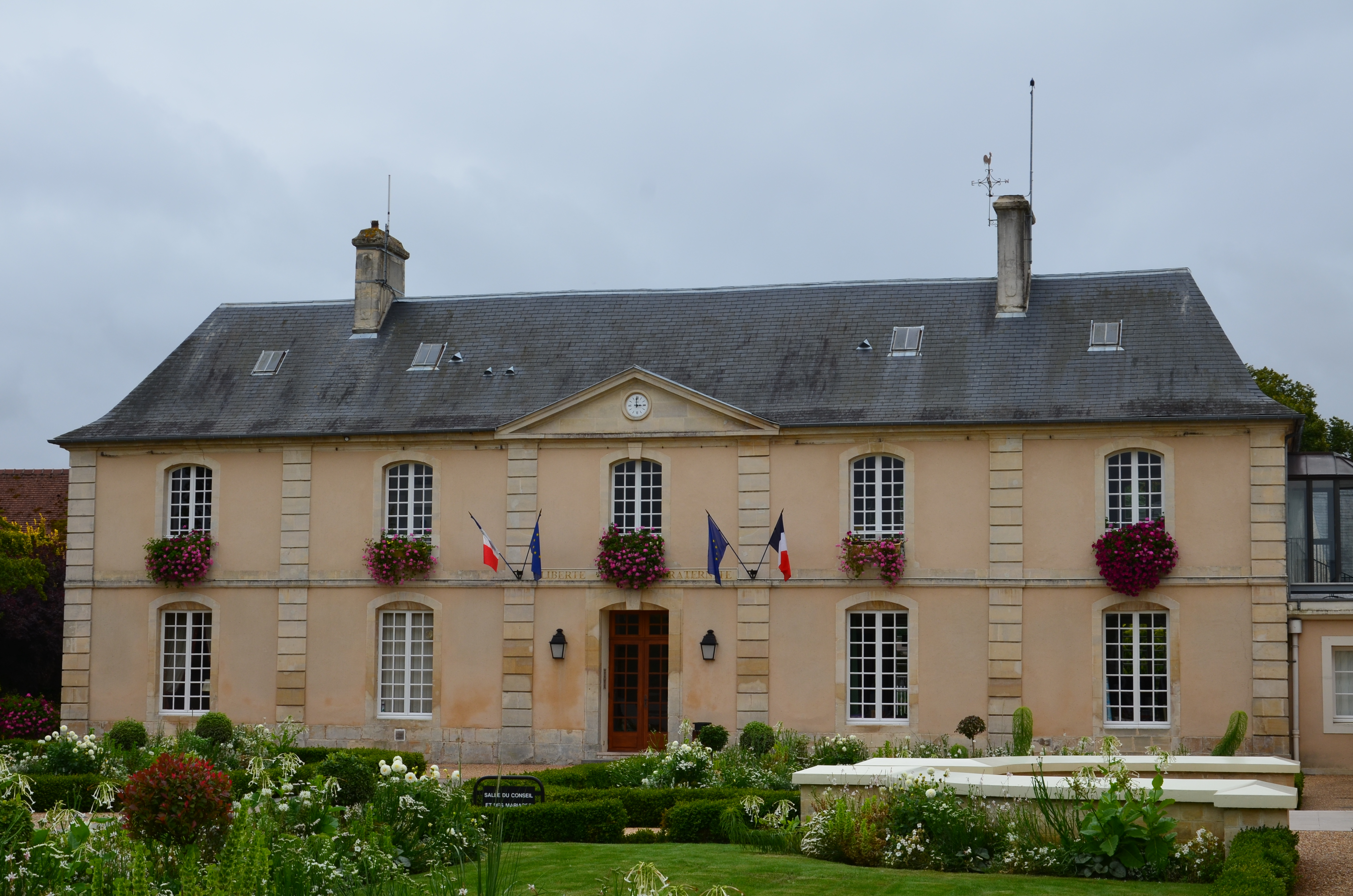
- The town hall in Cormelles-le-Royal

- Coat of arms
- Location of Cormelles-le-Royal
- Location within France Location within Normandy
- Coordinates: 49°09′17″N 0°19′45″W
- Country: France
- Region: Normandy
- Department: Calvados
- Arrondissement: Caen
- Canton: Ifs
- Intercommunality: Caen la Mer

Government
  - Mayor (2020–2026): Jean-Marie Guillemin
- Area^{1}: 3.48 km^{2} (1.34 sq mi)
- Elevation: 30 m (98 ft)
- Highest elevation: 37 m (121 ft)
- Lowest elevation: 13 m (43 ft)
- Population (2023): 5,377
  - Density: 1,550/km^{2} (4,000/sq mi)
- Time zone: UTC+01:00 (CET)
  - Summer (DST): UTC+02:00 (CEST)
- INSEE/Postal code: 14181 /14123
- ^{1} French Land Register data, which excludes lakes, ponds, glaciers > 1 km^{2} (0.386 sq mi or 247 acres) and river estuaries.

Cormelles-le-Royal (French pronunciation: [kɔʁmɛl lə ʁwajal]) is a commune in the Calvados department in the Normandy region in northwestern France.

== History ==
The territory of La Guérinière was formerly part of Cormelles, the northern limit of the town following the road to the oxen between the Falaise road and the path of Sente-de-Mondeville (currently boulevard de l'Avenir). The family of Guérinière owned a castle, located between the current streets of Charity, Clos-du-Monastère and the Champ-de-Foire. The castle was destroyed during the Battle of Caen. In 1875, the city of Caen bought the 27 hectares of land of the Caen riding academy, located on the grounds of the castle of Guérinière, to develop a field of maneuver for the garrisons of the city. In 1951, this territory was officially attached to the municipality of Caen.

During the Battle of Normandy, the village was fortified by the Germans, shortly before the start of operations Goodwood and Atlantic by the British and Canadians. The village was liberated on 19 July 1944 by Canadian-Scottish battalions and North Nova Scotia Highlanders belonging to the 3rd Canadian infantry division after fighting against the soldiers of the 272nd German infantry division. Three weeks later, Canadian and Polish troops gather there to launch Operation Totalize. On August 8, US aircraft bombed by mistake causing losses. Cormelles-le-Royal is decorated with the Croix de Guerre 1939–1945.

== Toponymy ==
The name of the locality is attested in Cormellis forms around 1070 and Cormellae in 1195. The origin of the toponym is not clearly established, but Albert Dauzat and Charles Rostaing put forward the hypothesis of the old French corme, "sorbe" with diminutive -ella. Royal is an allusion to the privileges granted to the inhabitants of this town by Philip VI by letters patent of 22 June 1347.

During the revolutionary period of the National Convention (1792-1795), the commune, created from the parish of Cormelles-le-Royal took the name of Cormelles-le-Libre which was then cut short in Cormelles. The determinant "the Royal" was added again in 1969.

== Geography ==
Cormelles-le-Royal is located in the plain of Caen, in the southern suburbs of Caen . Its center is 4.5 km from the center of the regional capital. Located in the basin of the Orne, the territory covers an area of 348 hectares and has a population of 4829 inhabitants, a density of 1387 inhabitants / km 2. The highest point (37 m ) is at the southern limit, near the southern ring road interchange. The lowest point (13 m) corresponds to the exit of the only watercourse of the municipality of the territory, to the northeast.

== Population ==
Historical population
| Year | Pop. | ±% p.a. |
|---|---|---|
| 1968 | 1,862 | — |
| 1975 | 3,099 | +7.55% |
| 1982 | 3,442 | +1.51% |
| 1990 | 4,604 | +3.70% |
| 1999 | 4,599 | −0.01% |
| 2007 | 4,431 | −0.46% |
| 2012 | 4,818 | +1.69% |
| 2017 | 4,898 | +0.33% |
| 2023 | 5,377 | +1.57% |
Source: INSEE

== Administration ==
=== Mayors of Cormelles-le-Royal ===
| From | To | Name | Party |
|---|---|---|---|
| 1983 | 2014 | Bernard Oblin | Independent |
| 2014 | 2020 | Jean-Marie Guillemin | Independent |
| 2020 | 2026 | Jean-Marie Guillemin | Independent |

=== Twinning ===
- Combe Martin (United Kingdom)
- Röthlein (Germany)

== See also ==
- Communes of the Calvados department
