= Giberville bucket =

Early medieval bucket excavated in France

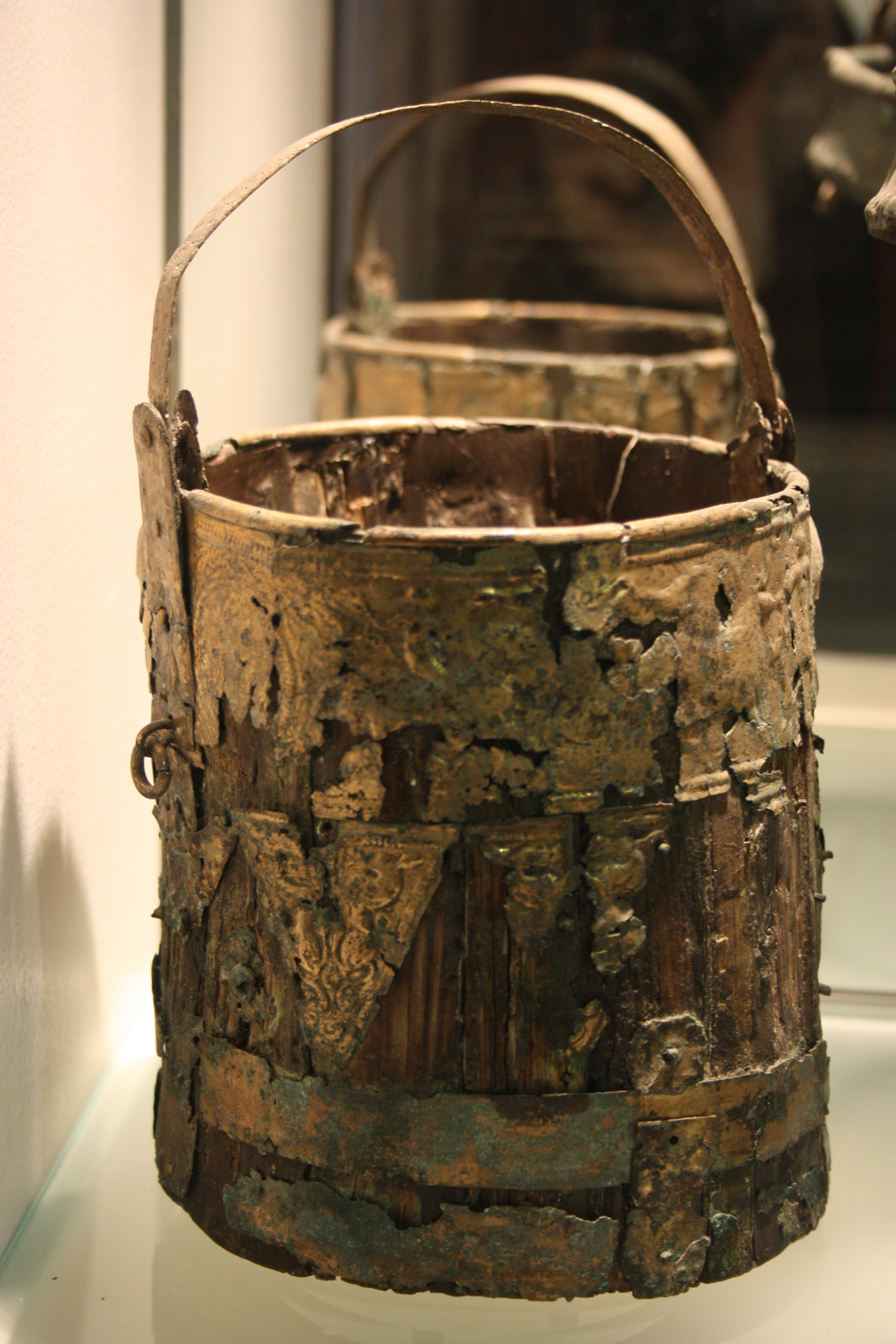
- The Giberville bucket on display at the Musée de Normandie in Caen.
- Material: Wood and bronze
- Height: 15 cm
- Discovered: 1970s
- Culture: Ancient Rome

The Giberville bucket is a bucket in wood and bronze from a grave of the 5th or 6th century AD excavated in the commune of Giberville, in what is now the Calvados department in Normandy, France. It is now in the Normandy Museum in Caen.

Discovered during excavations of a Merovingian necropolis in the 1970s, the Giberville bucket, dating from Late Antiquity, was found where the ancient practice of burying buckets in graves had been revived in Gaul since the 4th century. The bucket was unearthed in a necropolis that was in use from the late 5th to the 6th century, adding to its historical significance.

Made of yew wood and bronze, the artifact is richly decorated with representations of a Roman emperor and a hunting scene. Because of this decoration, the excavator interprets the bucket as a gift from an emperor to a member of a barbarian community. This object was subsequently kept and buried with a woman at the beginning of the century. It is, therefore, a witness of the transition period between the Western Roman Empire's end and the Merovingian era's beginning.

While fragments of other similar buckets have been found, the Giberville bucket stands out for its exceptional state of preservation and unique iconography, making it an extremely rare and significant object.

== Location ==
The bucket was found in 1970s archaeological excavations of a necropolis of 482 graves in Giberville called "Le Martray." Giberville is 2.5 km from the Orne and its tributary, the Gronde, and 7 km south-southwest of the Roman camp at Bénouville.

The name first appears in 1066 and again in 1082 as Goisbertivilla. This is a typical medieval name ending in -ville, meaning "rural estate." The first element, Giber-, comes from the Germanic name Gausbert(us). The name Le Martray is also medieval. It means "martyr." It remembers the place's funerary destination.

== History ==
=== Background information ===
==== The historiographical issue ====
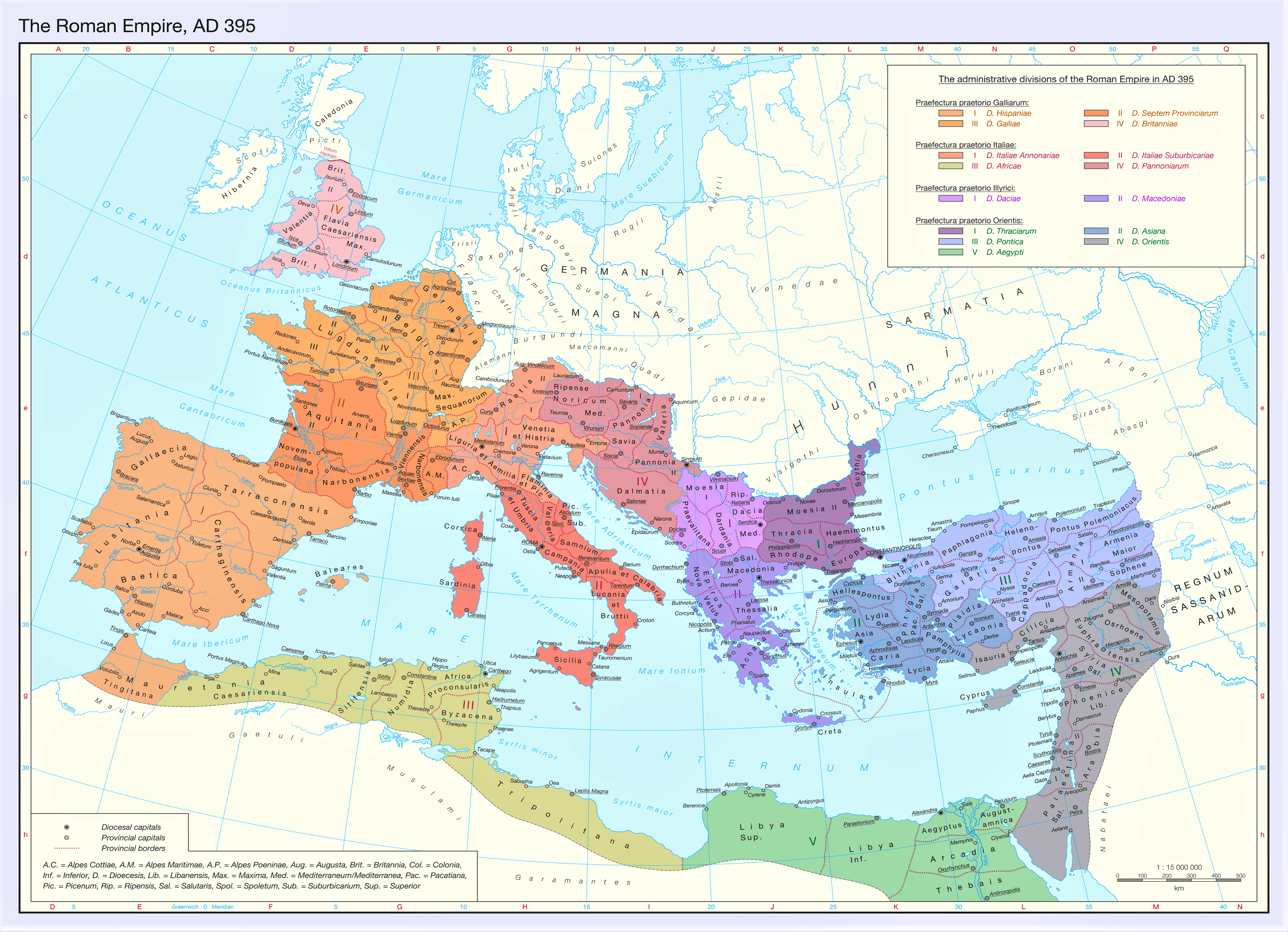
Ancient Rome in 395

The last decades of the Western Roman Empire and relations with newcomers from "barbarian people" led to a new way of thinking about history. The Empire accepted the creation of independent political entities within its borders. In French history books from the late 19th and early 20th centuries, "barbarian invasions" was a common term. Historiography exaggerates the negative aspects of these federation agreements.

The question of identity and ethnic and cultural identification looks at Romanity and citizenship. The Edict of Caracalla of 212 changed this by allowing all free men in the Empire to become citizens.

Several research studies have revealed that the Roman Empire and the 'barbarian' world were not as distinct as previously believed. The changes in Gaul during Late Antiquity were intricate, with the region being divided between a struggling and isolated north, Armorican Gaul, and the south, still under the influence of Roman-educated elites until the Western Roman Empire's demise. The federated peoples settled in the Empire and were in client kingdoms within its borders. They pledged allegiance to Rome, providing soldiers in return for money and other benefits. Barbarian kings only ruled their people. Flavius Honorius and his general Constantius set up the client kingdoms in Gaul from 411 onwards. They replaced the old limes system with a new, more practical policy.

==== Changes in the fifth century ====
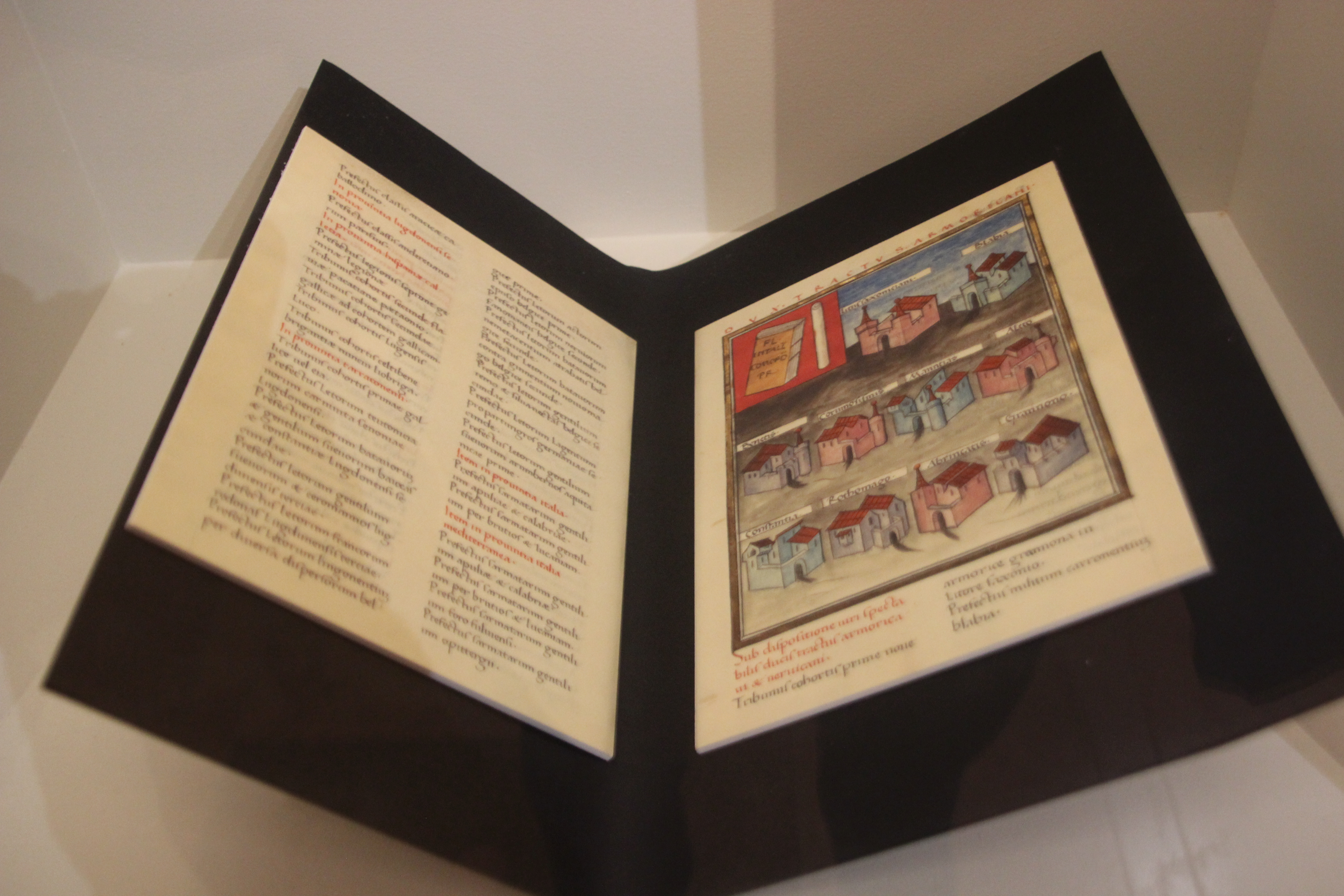
Notitia dignitatum exhibited in 2022-2023 at the Museum of Jean-Claude-Boulard Carré Plantagenêt

Barbarian kingdoms were groups of different ethnicities who wanted to join the Roman army and take care of their people. Barbarian warriors helped defeat Attila at the Battle of the Catalaunian Fields.

Northern Gaul had fewer troops to maintain the limes because the elite moved closer to Frankish power. The Empire's priority was to protect southern Gaul and Italy. In 439, the Vandals took over Carthage without permission. The Eastern Roman Empire may have accepted the late fifth-century kingdoms because it was impossible to retake the capital of Roman Africa.

In the 5th century, the northern part of Gaul rejected imperial authority. There are few sources, but it may have been linked to Constantine III being overthrown. The usurper was killed in Arles in 411. Troops on the Rhine withdrew during this troubled period. They were protecting the English Channel but could not prevent new arrivals. The central power hunted down supporters of the usurper or those backing the "separatist movement." It regained a foothold and reorganized the defenses around 411-416. However, the Armorican provinces remained in turmoil throughout the century. Their rallying to Clovis could be seen as the religious elites' rallying to a Catholic Christian leader in a context marked by Arianism, particularly among the Visigoths.

=== History of the site and necropolis ===
==== Funerary rites between continuity and change ====
Map of Roman city territories during the Late Roman Empire in present-day Normandy.

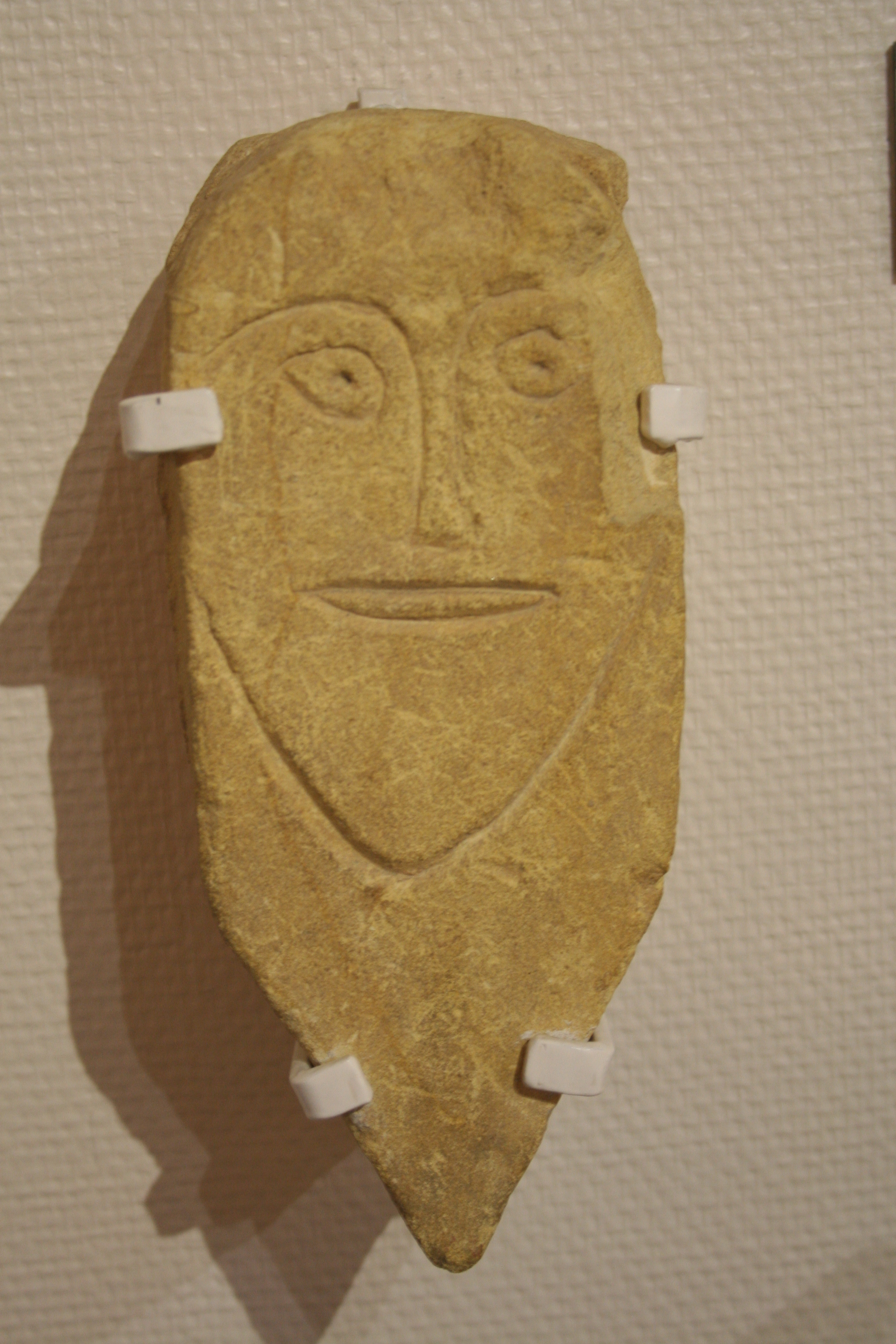
Funerary stele discovered in Mondeville in the early 20th century and dated to the 7th century.

Roman funeral rites included a banquet, a sacrifice, and the burial of the body or ashes. The burial site was decorated with items for the banquet and the deceased. In Late Antiquity, these rites continued to be necessary. Most burials were in cemeteries, not at home. Christianity replaced this last "legacy of Antiquity," moving the deceased's final resting place closer to the living.

Barbarian mercenaries adopted burial rites that showed the social status of the dead. The body was put in a wooden box in a pit. Graves were covered with a mound of earth or stone and a stone or other marker with the name of the person buried. Burial rites and grave objects continued to be important in Late Antiquity.

Countryside necropolises are family-run. The least furnished graves are for "members of their household." They were set up along communication routes and on territorial boundaries. They lasted from a few generations to two or three centuries. As Christianity spread, chapels appeared in the countryside in the sixth and seventh centuries.

People from Romano-Barbaric populations are buried in traditional clothes, but the fabrics are not preserved. Archaeologists can find fibulae. Pins mark women's burials, showing they wore specific headdresses. The burials sometimes have an "ostentatious character" (like at Airan). They show a "late-antique cultural mix" with Gallo-Roman funerary rites and burial in traditional clothes. Specialists can tell that people from other places were there because they found things like fibulae, pins, and combs. Men's graves have belts with buckle plates made in Barbaricum.

==== The necropolis on the Caen Plain was occupied from the 5th to the 7th century. ====
Location of Giberville during the Late Roman Empire.

This area of the Caen Plain has a long history of human activity. Near Martray, there is evidence of an Indigenous farm and a burial enclosure. Archaeologists found things from the Early Roman period about 1.1 km from the farm. They found a building that might have been a tannery and a bronze tripod.

The Caen Plain had many small settlements. The village had about fifteen families in the Early Middle Ages. Two necropolises have been found in Giberville. The area's burials show the community was "affluent" during the 6th century. This was due to trade from the Roman Empire, not just farming. The skeletons had a thin look, especially the women. The men were about 1.72 m tall, and the women were about 1.59 m tall. This is taller than the people in the Saint-Martin-de-Fontenay necropolis. The community had a better quality of life. In the 7th century, women were taller and slimmer, while men were shorter but more robust. The population started to change, becoming more open to the outside world. About 14% of burials were of non-adults in the sixth century and 17% in the 7th century. More children and young adults are buried than adults. In the sixth century, more young people died than in previous centuries. There are fewer young men and more young women and women over 60 in graves from the century. In the next century, things got better for women but worse for young men. Their share of the necropolis rose from 25% to 39%. This may be linked to a bias in the male sample.

The necropolis was used from the 5th to the 7th century. The tomb with the bucket dates from the early 6th century. Only about 20 of the later tombs have sarcophagi. The graves are in rows facing west and east. Archaeologists found wooden coffins and one cremation. Only about 20 of the later tombs have sarcophagi. The graves are in rows facing west and east. Archaeologists found wooden coffins. One cremation was found.

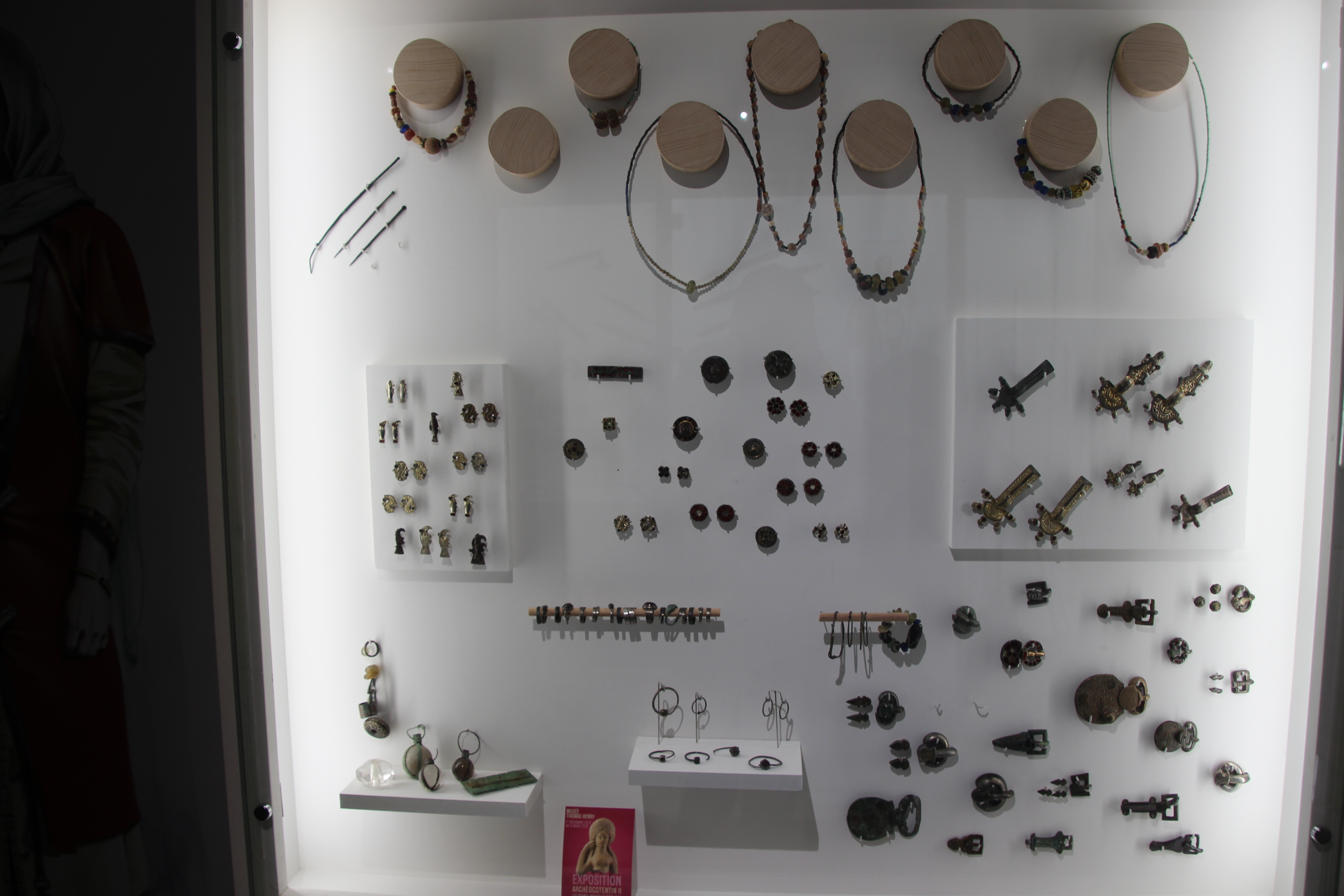
Display case dedicated to women's costumes of the 6th century at the Normandy Museum.

There are groups of tombs. Archaeologists found that people buried close together were related. A burial enclosure was also found. It was marked by a fence with post-hole marks, 30 to 45 cm in diameter. A 90 cm post contained a "wooden candle" to indicate the cemetery site. The size of the enclosure did not change. The posts were about 1.20 m high, and the candle was twice as high. Stone blocks marked graves.

Christian Pilet and Jean-Yves Marin date the work to the late 4th and early 5th centuries. Marin says the bucket is difficult to date because of the fragmentary inscription. The bucket was found in a woman's grave, where she was buried with weapons. Archaeologists call these graves "chief's graves." Women's graves near these burials had lots of material, including fibulae, necklaces, glass, and wooden tableware.

The first group of graves is east-west and has a palisade. It includes the necropolis' "founder". A wooden palisade and a 5-meter-diameter ditch surrounded the "founder" grave. Later graves are around a core. Archaeologists believe a structure existed a few meters from the first group in a complex dated to the end of the 5th and beginning of the 6th centuries.

The tombs were robbed when the necropolis was in use. Two-thirds of the tombs were looted, and archaeologists found a pile of objects. Looting damaged the graves, but archaeologists found some food and fire pits. Excavations have also found a yellow glass apodous beaker and a Frankish coin from the first third of the 6th century.

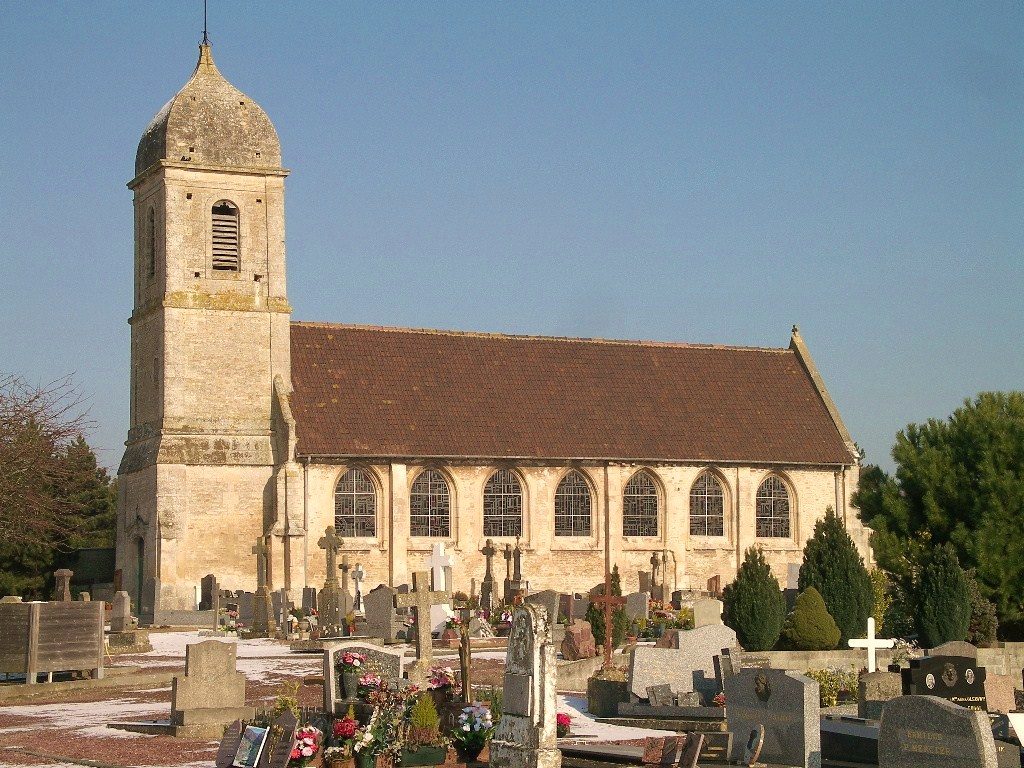
Saint-Martin de Giberville church and cemetery.

The use of these coins, weighing close to a silique and found in soldiers' graves, constitutes "without doubt an important milestone in Frankish coinage at the beginning of the 6th century." The excavations also uncovered elements of a necklace and fibulae "in gilded silver and cloisonné glassware."

Throughout the 7th century, the necropolis maintained its structure, with groups of tombs and overlapping burials, a continuity that extended into the 8th century. The ornamental objects discovered, including arched fibulae, are part of a widespread group from the 6th and 7th centuries, with only two objects bearing a cross. The presence of nineteen Caen stone sarcophagi, 'looted or reused,' is a testament to the Christianization of the local community.

After the necropolis was gradually abandoned in the second half of the 7th century, the deceased were buried not far from the church of Saint-Martin de Giberville, 2 km away, or around a church dedicated to Saint Germain, which has since disappeared and whose toponymy, the "Champ Saint-Germain" or "Dellage Saint-Germain," is still remembered today. Cemeteries were located not far from the "community of the living." The necropolis around the church was in use from the late 7th to the 14th century. The funerary enclosure in the Martray area, "the place of the dead," left its mark on the landscape and people's minds.

=== Discovery and description of Tomb n° 41 ===
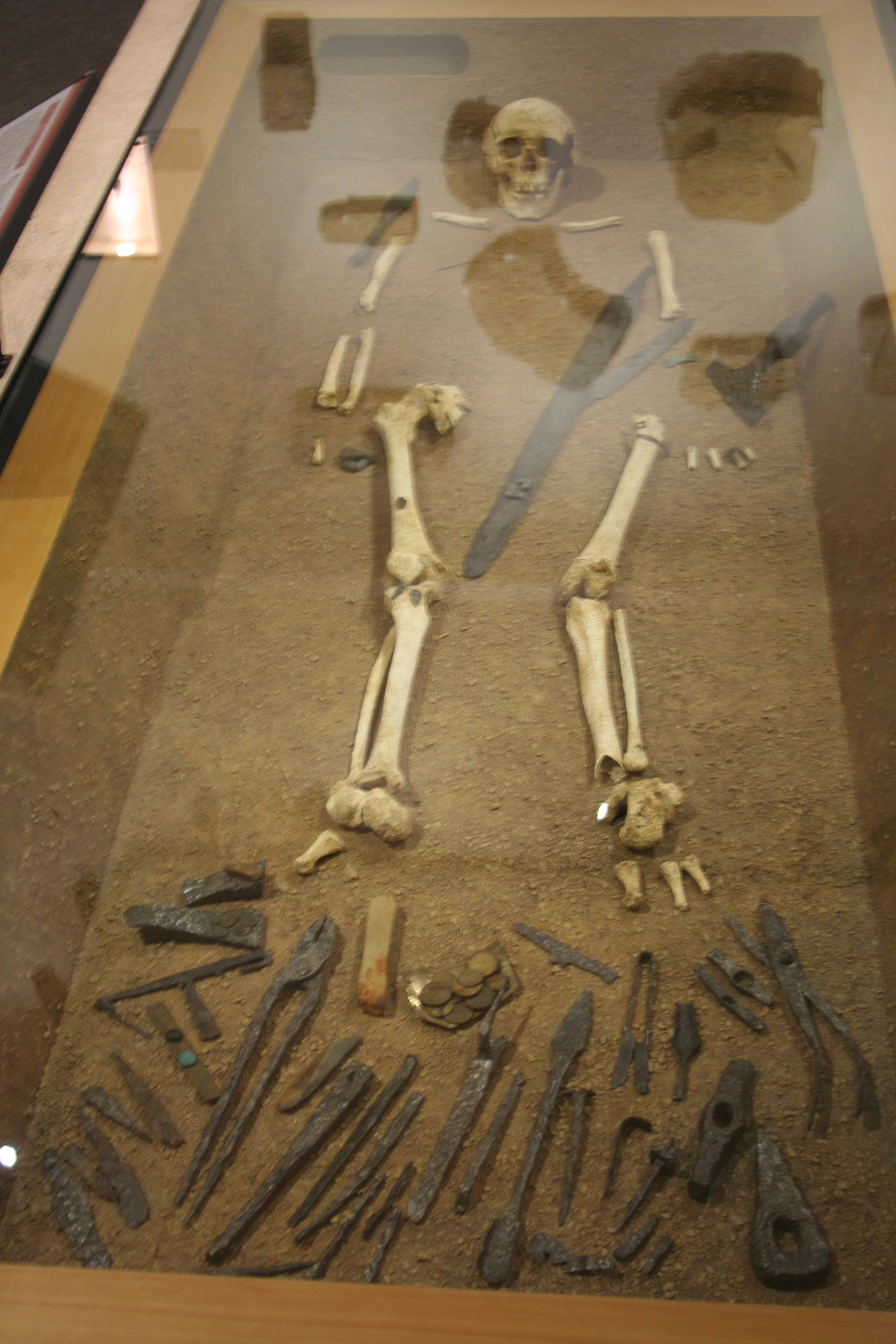
Grave n°10 of the Hérouvillette blacksmith-warrior, excavated by Joseph Decaëns and preserved in the Normandy Museum. The Hérouvillette necropolis was occupied from the mid-6th to the mid-7th century.

Work on many Merovingian necropolises began in the 1900s. A study on buckets was published in the 2000s. Funerary archaeology was active in the former Lower Normandy region from the 1970s to the 1990s, excavating necropolises in the Caen plain. Three sword-bearing individuals were found in graves on the Giberville site. From 1975 to 1980, several salvage excavations were carried out in the commune. Roadworks and housing development led to the discovery of a necropolis to the north of the church, and the development of the industrial zone led to the discovery of the Martray necropolis. Thirty sarcophagi were found around Saint-Martin church between 1975 and 1980.

The Martray necropolis has limestone tombs and sarcophagi. The eastern side of the Martray necropolis was not excavated because of the road. They found 394 tombs and think there are about 482 burials, including the area covered by the road. Two hundred two tombs were from the early 20th century, but a third was empty, and a quarter had been reused. One hundred eighty-nine tombs were from the 6th century. This is fewer than in the previous century, possibly because the area was not fully excavated. Eighty tombs had no skeletons. The archaeologist says the skeletons were not well preserved.

One of the most interesting discoveries was a bucket found in tomb 41. This unique find was unearthed during rescue excavations from October 1976 to June 1977.

Like the other tombs in the necropolis, grave n° 41 was hewn from limestone, and the bucket was at the tomb's foot. The bucket is the only remaining artifact from the looted grave. The Martray necropolis also had Anglo-Saxon fibulae.

== Description ==
=== General bucket description ===
The bucket is made of yew wood slats. This type of wood is used in most cases, although buckets of oak or ash are known to exist. Yew is known to have been used for containers and common wooden pottery despite the toxins present in the wood. The wood is rot-resistant and has "numerous technical and aesthetic qualities."

The Giberville bucket has fourteen slats, each 14 cm high and 3 cm wide. Its handle and headband are embossed bronze, and the decoration is engraved bronze.

The Giberville bucket, with its unique features, stands a modest 15 cm high, with a diameter of 12.8 cm at the mouth and 13.7 cm at the bottom. The decoration, a captivating blend of political and mythological elements, adds a fascinating dimension to the artifact. The 42 cm circumference is adorned with two bronze bands, each 1.3 cm wide. A brass band graces the top of the pail, enhancing its allure. A 13.3 cm high and 1.4 cm wide bronze band is used for the handle, a distinctive feature of this historic artifact.

The metal band supporting the decoration is 17 cm by 4 cm, 0.5 mm thick. A 4.5 cm by 2 cm bronze plaque is attached to the handle. Traces of repairs have been found on other preserved examples, such as those from Rhenen and Saint-Dizier.

In terms of size and shape, the Giberville bucket, as described by Amélie Vallée, corresponds to the "bronze-plated bucket" type, although some have Christian or geometric decoration. It was probably made by mobile craftsmen from northern France, between the Seine and the Oise, following a "late Roman tradition." However, the question of fixed or itinerant workshops remains unanswered, even if several craftsmen must have worked on the objects, given the variety of techniques. Amélie Vallée raises the question of centralized production and possible diffusion by imitation or the role of contacts between Merovingian elites and other peoples.

=== Description of bronze decor ===
The decoration is stamped and partially superimpositioned. The handle is engraved, and the upper band shows the right side of a coin, characters, a rider, and a standing figure with horses and deer (plates 10 and 11 in Pilet, 1990). The scene is depicted twice, on both sides of the handle. Five elements are present: a coin, a rider, a deer, a figure, and a head.

==== Monetary pattern ====
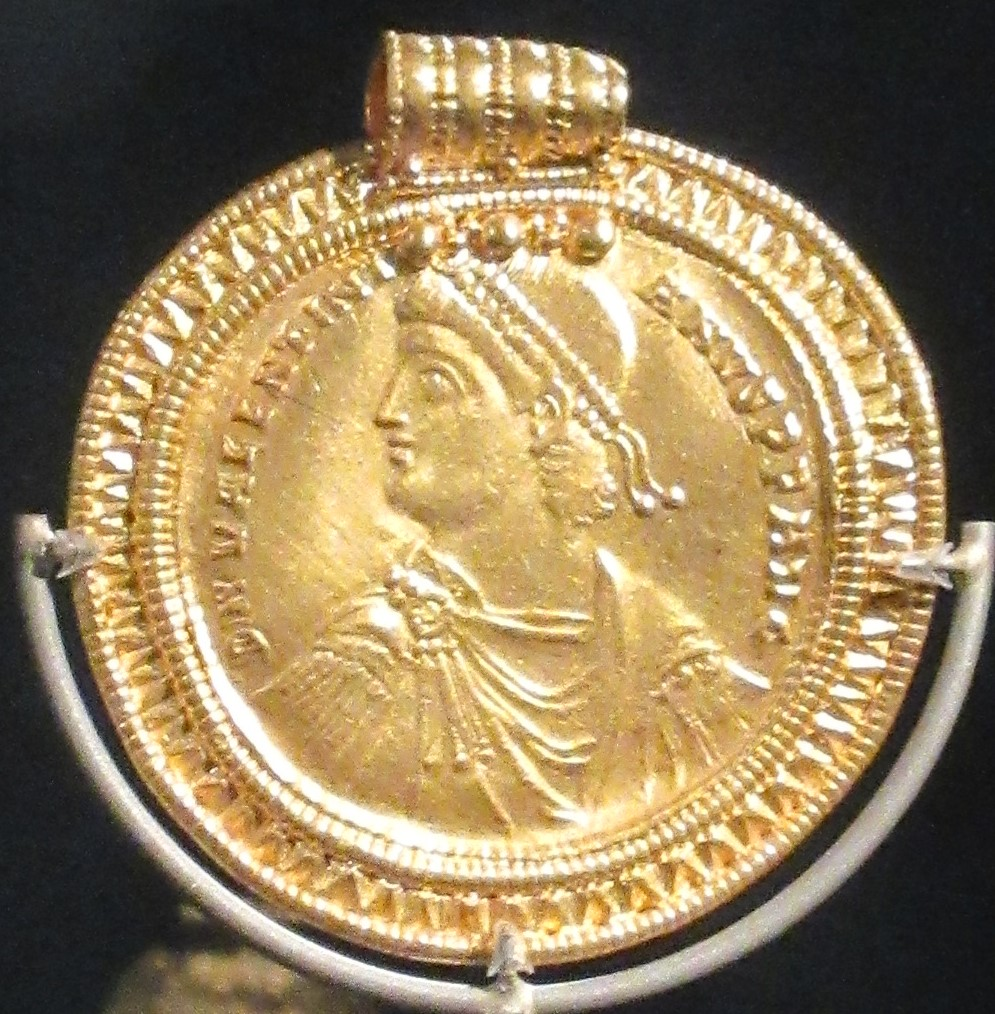
Gold coin (solidus) of Valentinian I, transformed into a medallion, (364-375).

The bucket's pattern represents a coin mounted in a medallion, a common practice in the 3rd century as a pendant or necklace. The practice continued into the 4th century. The right side of the coin is partially preserved.

Two patterns are present: a floral and a cruciform. The 30 mm diameter coin shows an imperial bust and the inscription "DN VAL". Given the long space for the figure's title, this is a Valentinian. The name Valentinian is not specified, and we don't know if it refers to Valentinian I, Valentinian II, or Valentinian III, as these emperors reigned from 364 to 455. Christian Pilet opts for Valentinian I. The imperial bust is adorned with a diadem of two rows of pearls and a drapery.

The size of the coin reproduced in the work, with a diameter of 30 mm, is more significant than that of a standard coin, which would be that of a multiple. Multiples were common during the reign of Valentinian and were intended to reward soldiers and dignitaries of the empire according to an ancient tradition. The size of common coins from the 4th century is about 20-21 mm.

Coins are often used to decorate lamps, in which case they are pressed onto clay. Coins used for embossing had to have relief, so gold and silver were used. Aurei or solidi were often used. The depicted coin is a "work of imagination", even if models inspired the craftsman.

==== Figures ====
A male figure is shown standing, wearing a helmet and a short tunic, holding a standard, the labarum, in his left hand. In Honorius's time, the emperor was depicted in this way with a standard or shield.

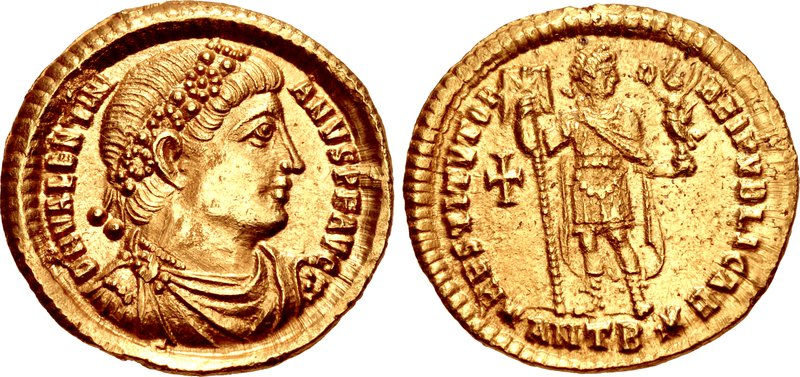
Obverse and reverse of a solidus of Valentinian I.

At the emperor's feet is a "prisoner" with unbound hands. The pattern is an artistic creation, although it is based on accurate representations circulating in Gallic workshops at the end of the 4th century. In imperial depictions, the right hand held a prisoner or a shield. This scene is similar to representations on the reverse of circulating coins of the Gloria Romanorum type. In another depiction, the emperor holds a standard in one hand, with a bound captive at his feet and the other on a shield.

==== Hunting scene ====
Reproduction of the hunting scene and surrounding elements.

Hunting scene with legend

The frame of the work shows a hunting scene. It depicts a hunt with a stag (a dix-cors) surrounded by four vertagus or vertragus breed dogs, "prized for their speed," as described by Arrien, with a rider carrying a spear. Wearing a cuirass and a diadem floating in the wind, this rider is identified as the emperor. This depiction of the emperor hunting is common, even though deer hunting is only of interest in the Late Roman Empire. Thus, stag hunting is one of the elements used to date the work.

The emperor is depicted three times: in money profile, standing, and on horseback. It is yet to be known whether the craftsman responsible for the work proceeded directly to the minting stage or whether he went through a die stage. The scene shows the end of the hunt. Four hounds have stopped the stag and are biting it in various places. The hounds surround the rider at the back, stop his mount, and prepare to throw a spear at the stag. He wears a cuirass, and the element behind his neck corresponds to a wreath, representing the emperor. The emperor is also depicted after the hunt, with a standard at his side. The horse tramples a snake. A 4 mm wide weave represents the horse.

There are also eight triangular designs, each with two opposing dogs; these dogs are also vertagus.

==== Head ====
The face of a Gorgon is depicted with snakes in her hair and her tongue sticking out. Such representations can also be seen in buckets found on the limes of Pannonia at Intercisa, preserved in Mainz in the Central Roman-Germanic Museum, and Budapest, in the Hungarian National Museum, when one of these two buckets was discovered, a coin of Valentinian I was found.

== Historical interpretation ==
The nature of the object reserved it for a member of the elite. The decoration has been interpreted as representing the emperor as the destroyer of his enemies and protector; therefore, it has a political meaning.

=== Evidence of funeral rites with little-known functions ===
Placing wooden buckets in burials is an ancient practice that has interested scientists since the 19th century. It is attested at the end of the Bronze Age and developed at the end of the La Tène period.

Discoveries have been made from southern England to the Rhine. From the 1st century, the practice has no longer been attested in northwestern Gaul. It is attested again from the 4th century and develops from the second half of the 5th century until the 2nd century, at the end of the reign of Clovis. Its presence in funerary contexts is attested in only a dozen cases. After the second half of the 7th century, burials' "funerary endowment" diminished. However, buckets continued to be placed in graves, especially in the Viking world and at Oseberg. The graves were marked not only by wooden buckets but also by various other objects. The buckets were placed in male and female graves, at the feet of the deceased near the head or other body parts, and inside or outside the coffin. Some were placed next to "prestige" pottery. The burials included ceramic, glass, copper alloy, and wooden vessels, adding to the richness and complexity of funerary practices.

The function of these buckets remains as much a mystery as their contents: alcoholic beverages, soup, or fragile objects. Matthieu Poux has highlighted the cultic role of the yew tree in Celtic times, as the toxicity of yew wood accentuated the "hallucinogenic effects of alcohol". The use of yew wood in the early Middle Ages, including for everyday objects, suggests that it was used for aesthetic or practical reasons. Some may have contained 'berries and eggs', but the information gathered is 'too specific'. The buckets may have been used at funeral feasts as part of the service. These feasts would have had the function of strengthening communities. The buckets could also have been used to deposit food, a widespread custom in Late Antiquity, and continued in the early Christian communities despite opposition from the clerical hierarchy.

According to Christian Pilet and Jacqueline Pilet-Lemière, the tombs of chiefs surrounded by the tombs of rich women make it "tempting to see in the organization of the society of the dead a reflection of the society of the living".

=== Evidence of links between the Emperor and barbarian soldiers ===
The bucket, made at the end of the 4th or beginning of the 5th century, could have been a donativum, a gift from an emperor to his soldiers, given the proximity of the Roman camp at Bénouville, only 7 km away, or to civilian dignitaries.

The depiction of the emperor could confirm the object's function, which is identical to that of other objects, such as buckle plates similar to those on the Notitia dignitatum or a gold belt discovered at Sainte-Croix-aux-Mines. High imperial officials gave gifts to "civil dignitaries and [...] army commanders". The depiction of the emperor hunting on the object is linked to the "propaganda of power".

Like Perseus, the emperor is protected from enemies by his virtus and the Gorgon's head. Because these patterns play a role, the craftsman has created a "work of propaganda". The emperor is depicted three times, and the object was intended as a gift. Gifts could also be belts with buckles, sometimes made of gold; the Giberville bucket, by comparison, is "a piece of junk". According to Christian Pilet, it could have been offered to a barbarian chieftain who had served in the Roman army, hoarded and repaired by a woman who took it to her grave at the beginning of the century. It may have contained elements that have since disappeared.

=== Evidence of Romano-Germanic culture ===
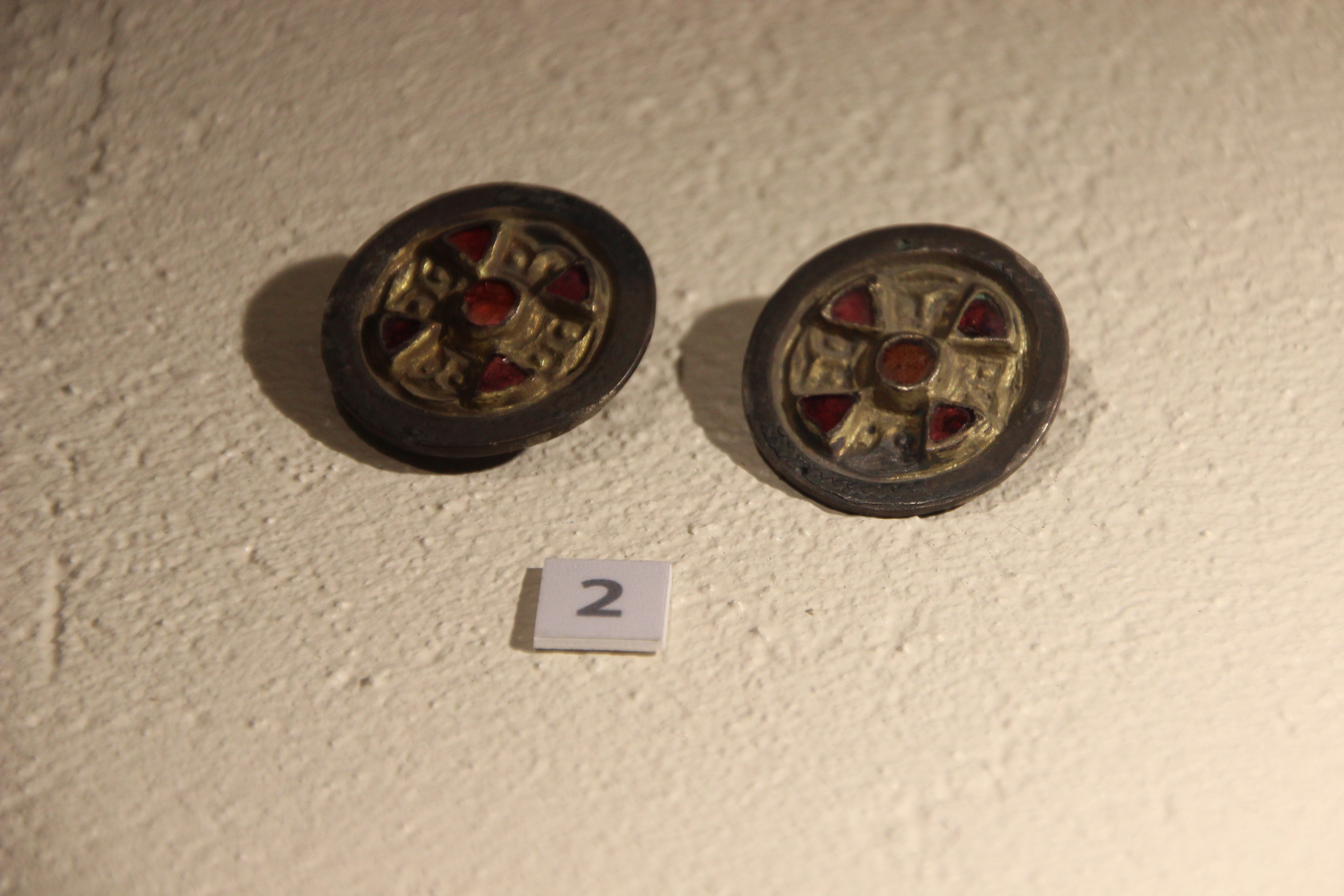
Circular fibula found in Giberville and preserved in the Normandy Museum.

The arrival of populations of Germanic origin in the Roman Empire impacted art, even if the ancient culture continued for several centuries. According to Christian Pilet, the Giberville bucket is a "witness of the Roman-Germanic culture", despite the difficulty of dating it.

Other evidence of this culture, "remnants", were collected in other Giberville burials, including a buckle and a buckle plate. These objects were buried in the graves of armed men with spears, bows, and axes, along with their wives.

The proximity of the sea led to trade with the other side of the Channel. Not far from the site of the Roman camp at Bénouville, excavations carried out in 1840 by Abbé Durand of the Société des Antiquaires de Normandie unearthed an Anglo-Saxon brooch that testifies to exchanges with Anglo-Saxon England. Anglo-Saxon brooches were also found in the Martray necropolis. Cremations also confirm the Anglo-Saxon presence.

== Bibliography ==
- Beaurepaire, François (2022). Les Noms de lieux du Calvados (in French). Paris: Éditions L'Harmattan. ISBN 978-2-14-028854-8.
- Berthelot, Sandrine; Hincker, Vincent (2018). Vous avez dit Barbares ? : Archéologie des temps mérovingiens en Normandie, Ve – VIIIe siècles (in French). Snoeck. ISBN 978-9461614544.
- Brunet, Vanessa; Lelarge, Samuel; Demarest, Mélanie; Paillard, Didier; Tixier, Benjamin (2019). Les sépultures de l'Antiquité tardive : une continuité des pratiques funéraires gallo-romaines. Vous avez dit Barbares ? (in French). Snoeck. pp. 58–63. ISBN 978-94-6161-4544.
- Delaplace, Christine (2018). Les derniers temps de l'Empire romain d'Occident (405-475). Vous avez dit Barbares ? (in French). pp. 44–51.
- Delacampagne, Florence (1990). Carte archéologique de la Gaule (in French). Vol. 14. Le Calvados. Éd. de la Maison des sciences de l'homme. ISBN 9782877540117.
- Marin, Jean-Yves (2001). Musée de Normandie Caen : Guide (in French). Paris: Skira. ISBN 9788881189137.
- Pilet, Christian; Pilet-Lemière, Jacqueline (1990). "Les tombes de chefs (Ve – VIe siècles) dans les nécropoles franques en Normandie". Annales de Normandie (in French). 23 (1): 191–201. doi:10.3406/annor.1990.4035.
- Pilet, Christian; Buchet, Luc; Pilet-Lemière, Jacqueline; Alduc-Le Bagousse, Armelle; Sansilbano-Collilieux, Montserrat (1993). "L'apport de l'archéologie funéraire à l'étude de la présence militaire sur le limes saxon, le long des côtes de l'actuelle Basse-Normandie". Mémoires de l'association française d'archéologie mérovingienne (in French). 5 (1): 157–173.
- Vallée, Amélie (2016). "La pratique funéraire du dépôt de seaux en bois à la période mérovingienne : un état de la question en Gaule du Nord-Ouest". Archéologie médiévale (in French). 4 (46): 33–56. doi:10.4000/archeomed.2777.
- Pilet, Christian (1978). "Calvados -Giberville. Le Martray". Archéologie médiévale (in French). 8 (1): 301–302.
- Pilet, Christian; Alduc-Le Bagousse, Armelle; Blondiaux, Joël; Buchet, Luc; Grévin, Gilles; Pilet-Lemière, Jacqueline (1990). "Les nécropoles de Giberville (Calvados) fin du Ve siècle - fin du VIIe siècle ap. J.C". Archéologie médiévale (in French). 20: 3–140. doi:10.3406/arcme.1990.972.

== See also ==
=== External links ===
- Seau de Giberville (3D)
