= Giberville =

- Commune
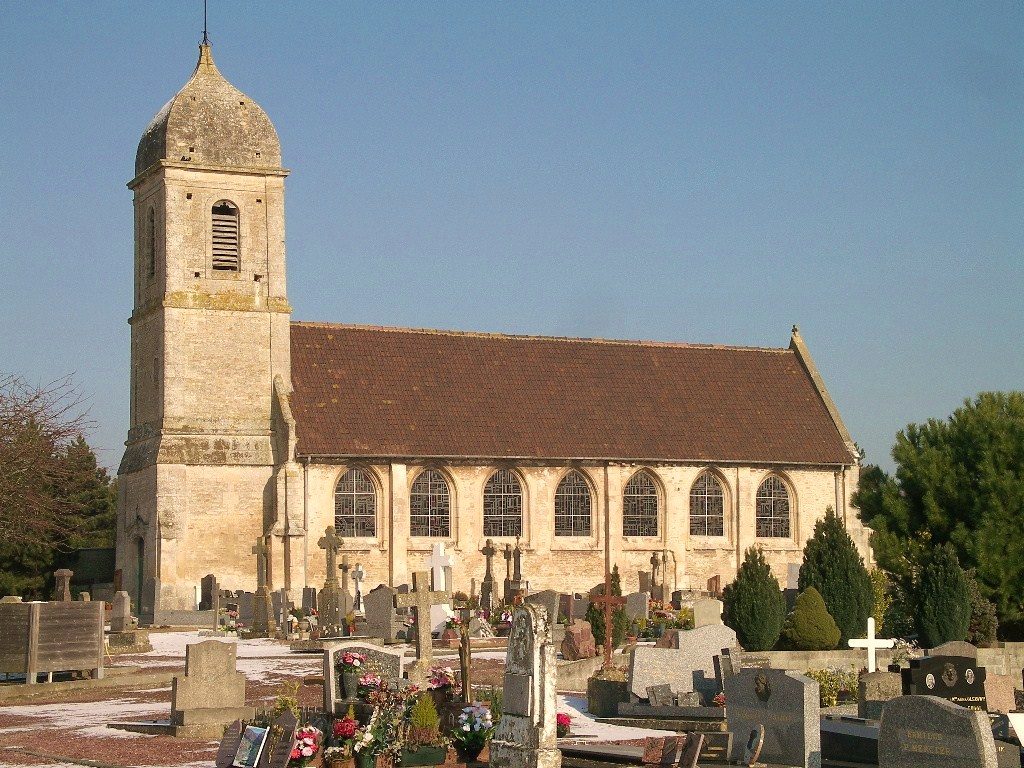
- The church in Giberville

- Coat of arms
- Location of Giberville
- Location within France Location within Normandy
- Coordinates: 49°10′57″N 0°16′52″W
- Country: France
- Region: Normandy
- Department: Calvados
- Arrondissement: Caen
- Canton: Ifs
- Intercommunality: CU Caen la Mer

Government
  - Mayor (2023–2026): Damien De Winter
- Area^{1}: 5.00 km^{2} (1.93 sq mi)
- Elevation: 19 m (62 ft)
- Highest elevation: 36 m (118 ft)
- Lowest elevation: 6 m (20 ft)
- Population (2023): 5,077
  - Density: 1,020/km^{2} (2,630/sq mi)
- Time zone: UTC+01:00 (CET)
  - Summer (DST): UTC+02:00 (CEST)
- INSEE/Postal code: 14301 /14730
- ^{1} French Land Register data, which excludes lakes, ponds, glaciers > 1 km^{2} (0.386 sq mi or 247 acres) and river estuaries.

Giberville (French pronunciation: [ʒibɛʁvil]) is a commune in the Calvados department in the Normandy region in northwestern France.

== Geography ==
A watercourse, Le Biez, flows through the commune.

== Population ==
Historical population

Year	Pop.	±% p.a.
1793	203	—
1800	216	+0.89%
1806	229	+0.98%
1821	288	+1.54%
1831	301	+0.44%
1841	323	+0.71%
1846	355	+1.91%
1851	356	+0.06%
1856	361	+0.28%
1861	332	−1.66%
1866	350	+1.06%
1872	332	−0.88%
1876	312	−1.54%
1881	295	−1.11%
1886	277	−1.25%
1891	239	−2.91%
1896	216	−2.00%
1901	219	+0.28%

Year	Pop.	±% p.a.
1906	239	+1.76%
1911	207	−2.83%
1921	441	+7.86%
1926	501	+2.58%
1931	1,744	+28.33%
1936	1,772	+0.32%
1946	1,140	−4.31%
1954	2,454	+10.06%
1962	2,788	+1.61%
1968	3,469	+3.71%
1975	3,560	+0.37%
1982	4,381	+3.01%
1990	4,574	+0.54%
1999	4,606	+0.08%
2007	4,753	+0.39%
2012	4,972	+0.90%
2017	4,967	−0.02%
2023	5,077	+0.37%

Source: EHESS and INSEE (1968-2023)

== International relations ==
Giberville is twinned with:

- Murlo (Italy) since 2007.

== See also ==
- Communes of the Calvados department
- Giberville bucket
