= Treasure of Saint-Germain-de-Varreville =

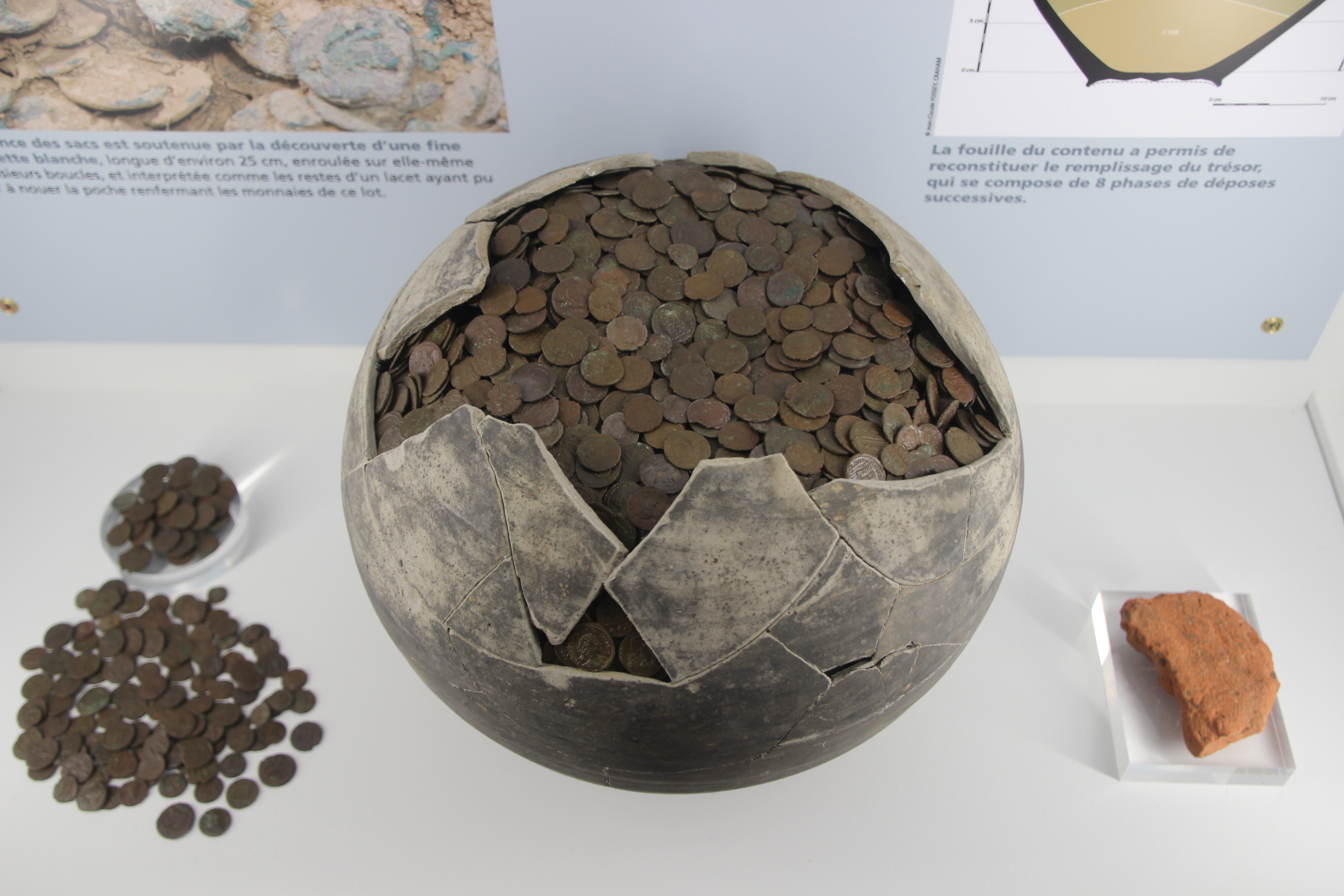
View of the vase and some coins

The Treasure of Saint-Germain-de-Varreville is a collection of 4th century AD coins in a vase discovered in 2011, in a farm in the village of Saint-Germain-de-Varreville, Normandy, north-western France. It was acquired by the city of Caen and is now kept in the Normandy Museum. According to Pierre-Marie Guihard of the University of Caen, the discovery is among the most important finds in Europe in recent history.

The treasure was discovered in a farm in the south of the village. No other ancient items were found at the site, except for a piece of ancient tile. The coins date to the Roman era. The farmer who owns the land, discovered the vase during the construction of a fence. Some coins have merged with each other due to the corrosion from copper oxide.

The formal excavation of the vase was carried out in the summer of 2011 by the Center for Ancient and Medieval Archaeological and Historical Research. First, the vase was stabilized, then the container was placed in a foam support structure and moved. Further excavation in the area were carried out in 2013 but revealed no further artifacts.

The coins found were minted in Treves, Lyon and Arles and provide useful information on the daily use of coins at the time. The hoard contains 14,528 coins dated from 310 to 348 AD, with a total weight of 42 kg including 3.8 kg for the container which is made of common ceramic. The coins are bronze with very little silver, weighing 3 grams and are 18 mm in diameter, and typically date to 330 AD. The coins were accumulated over a period of about ten years and placed in the vase in small pouches of fabric which have disappeared due to age. Cereal ears seem to have been intentionally placed in the container to absorb moisture.

== Sources ==
- Pierre-Marie Guihard "Saint-Germain-de-Varreville – La Grande Pièce, trésor monétaire" Archéologie de la France, 2013
- "14000 pièces de monnaie du IVe siècle trouvées dans le Cotentin: le trésor de 42 kg livre ses secrets!" La Presse de la Manche, 11 Nov 2011
- "Saint-Germain-de-Varreville. Le trésor retrouvé en 2011 livre ses secrets" La Manche Libre, 18 Nov 2019
