= Pail (container) =

Cylindrical shipping container

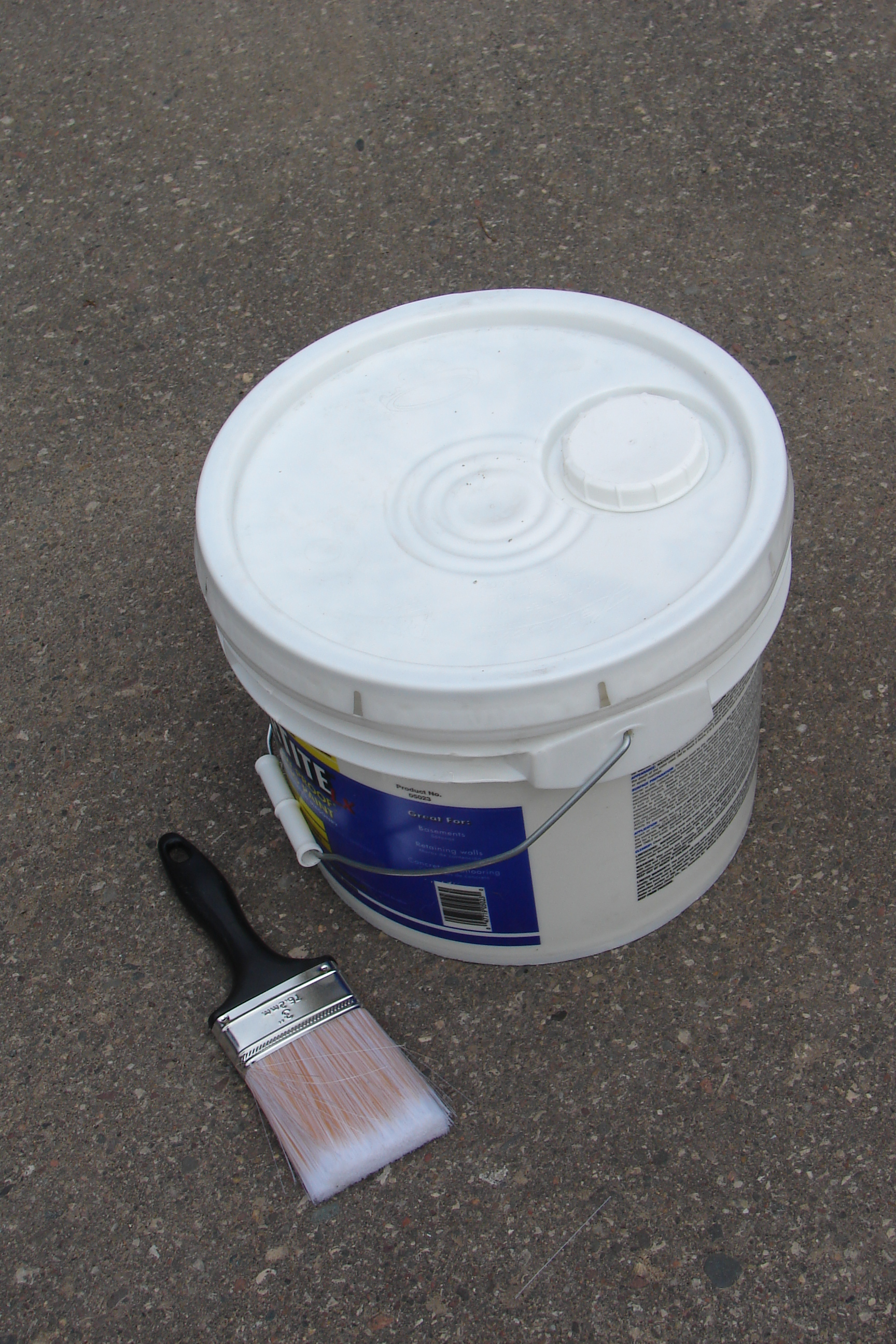
Three gallon plastic pail of paint with screw closure

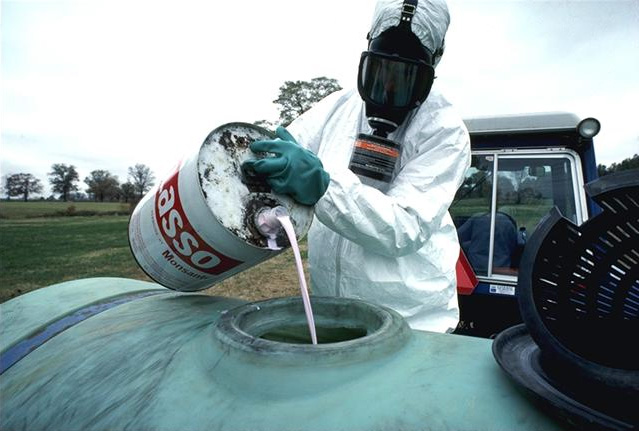
Steel pail of concentrated pesticide

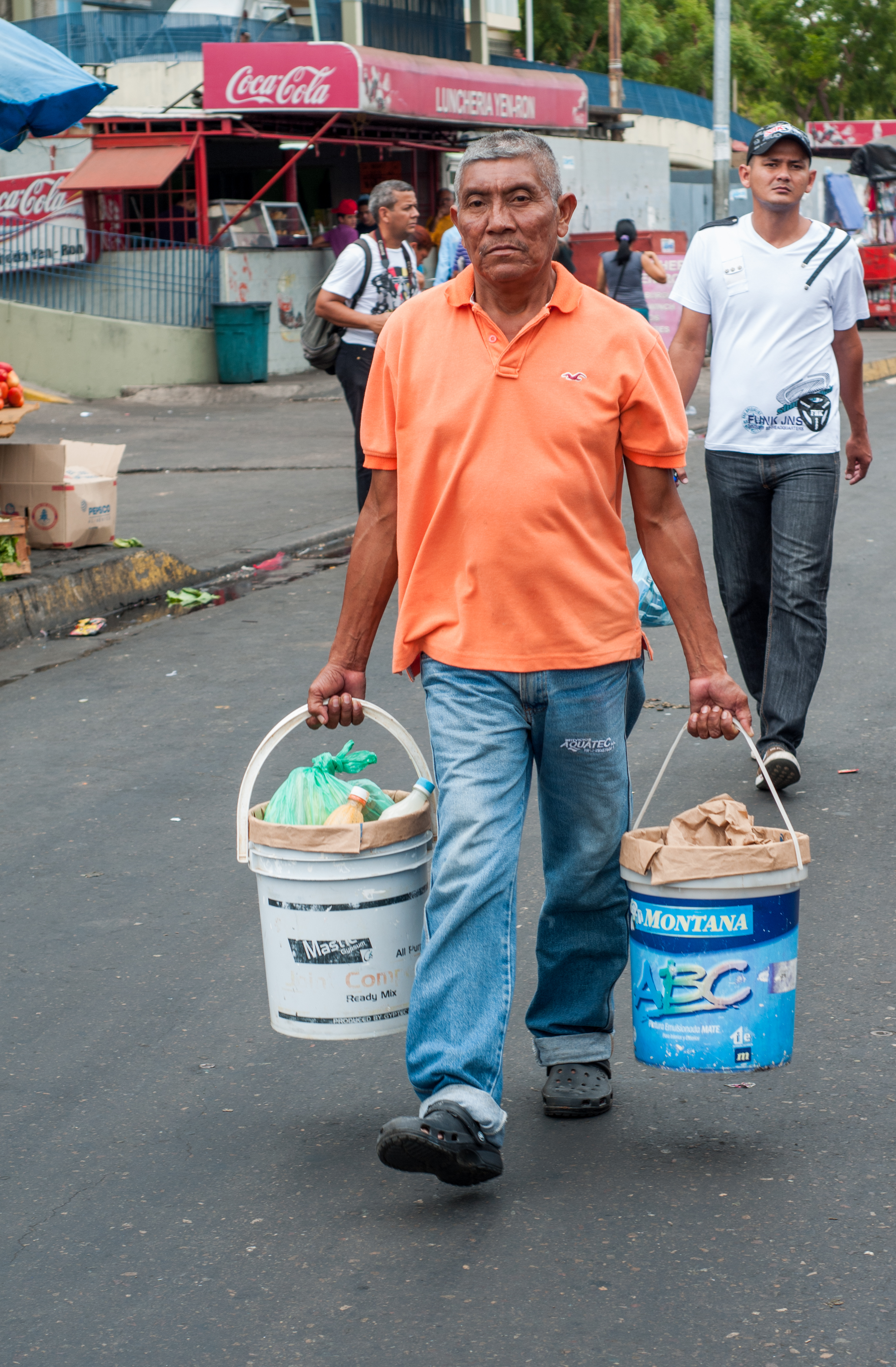
Open-head plastic pails being reused to carry other items

In technical usage in the shipping industry, a pail is a type of cylindrical shipping container with a capacity of about 3 to 50 litres (1 to 13 US gal). It can have straight or slanted sides and usually has a handle or bail. In non-technical usage, a pail is synonymous with a bucket.

== Construction ==
Pails can be made of

- Steel, tinplate
- Aluminium
- Fiber, paperboard
- Plastics

Pails are either "open head" with removable lids (covers) or are "tight head" with sealed heads and a screw closure.

Pails made of wood, and later metal, were originally used to transport milk, before the introduction of the milk churn.

== Uses ==
Pails are used for a variety of fluids and flowable materials. When properly constructed and certified, they may be used for dangerous goods shipments.

Pails are shipping containers that are shipped individually, shipped as secure unit loads on pallets, or shipped in corrugated fiberboard boxes.

== See also ==
- Bucket
- Plastic bottle

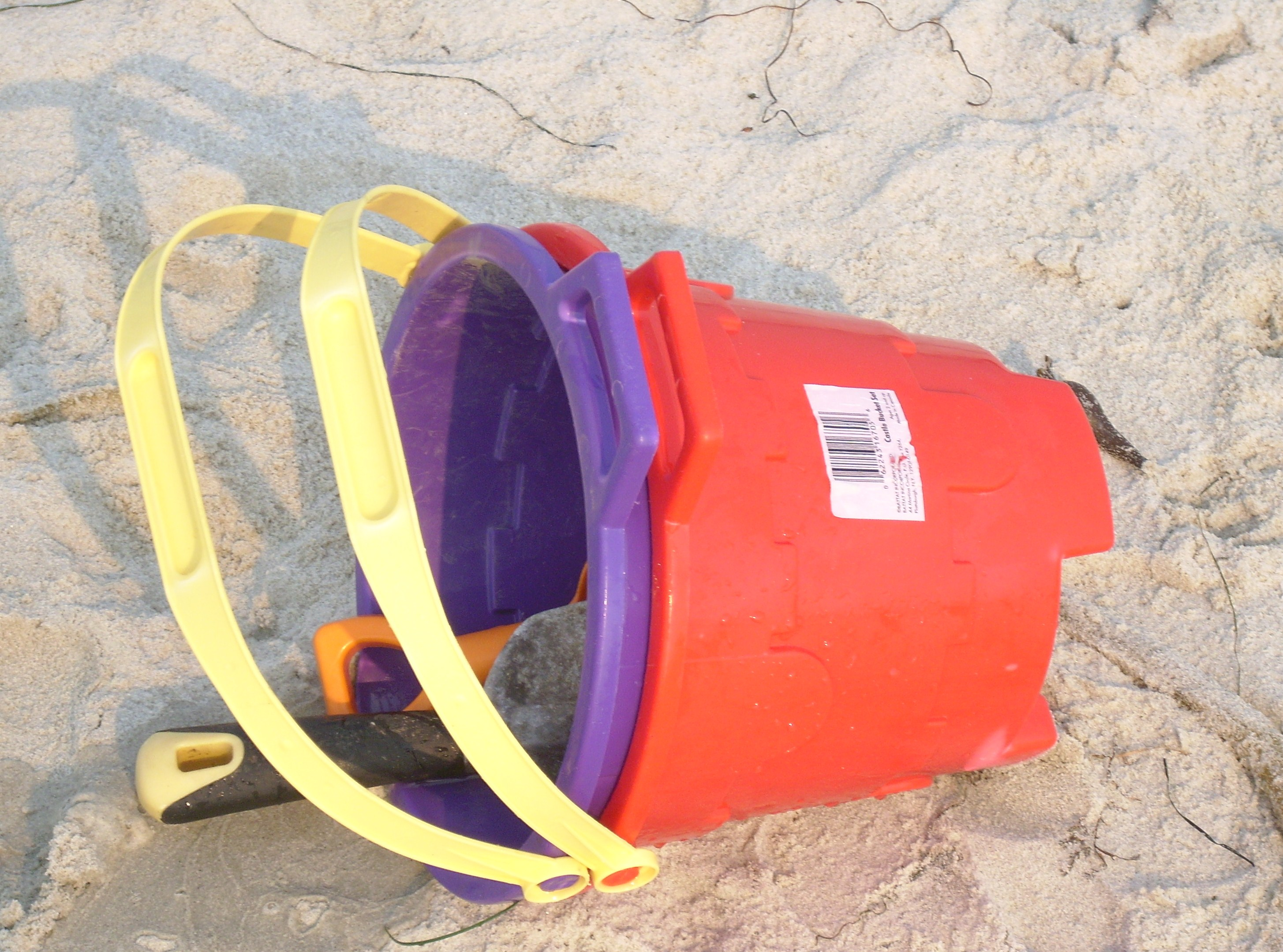
This is a kids pail for sand.
