= Bucket =

Open-top watertight container

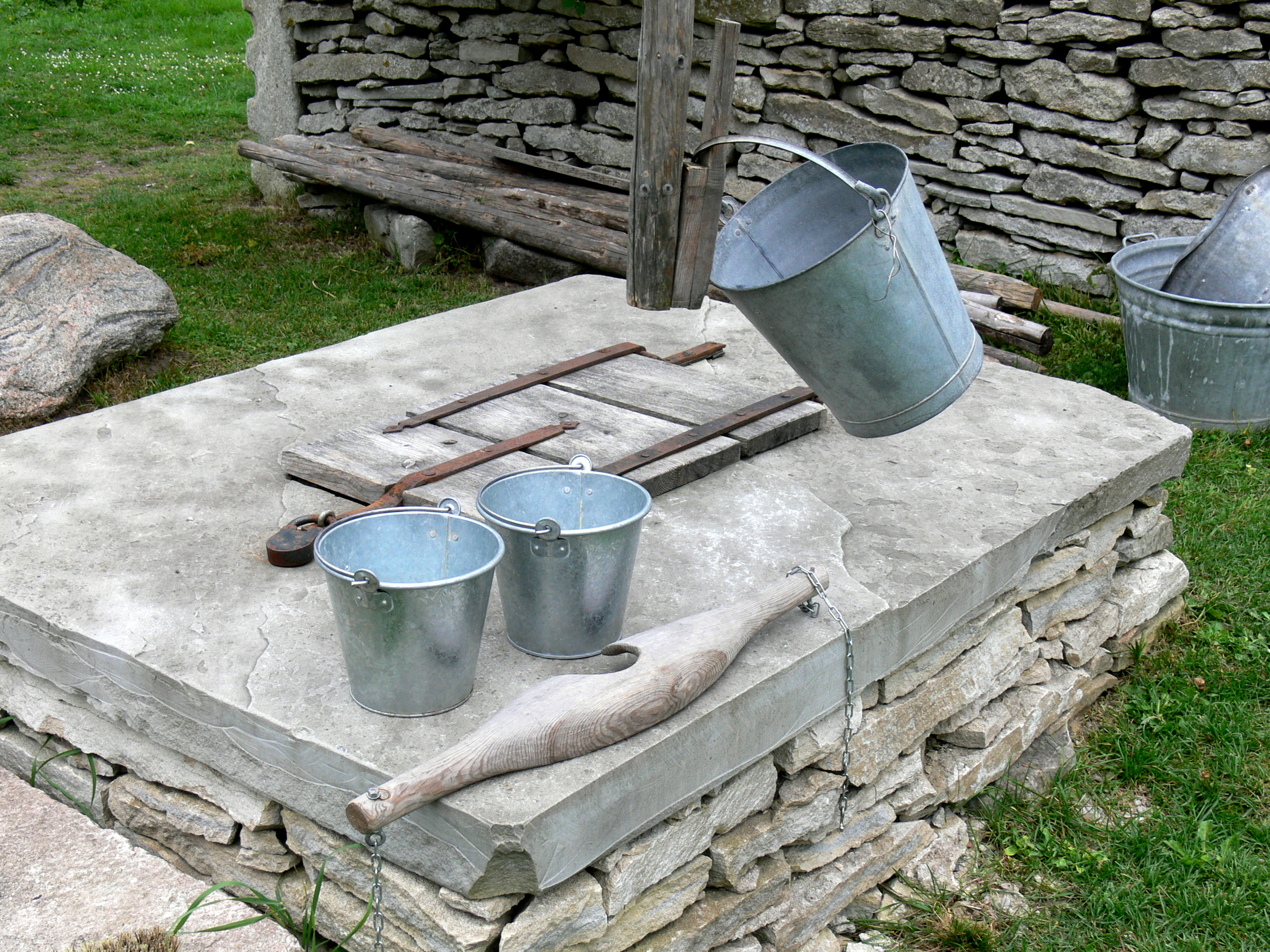
Water well buckets

A bucket is typically a watertight, vertical cylinder or truncated cone or square, with an open top and a flat bottom that is attached to a semicircular carrying handle called the bail. A bucket is usually an open-top container. When in reference to a shipping container, the term "pail" is used as a technical term, specifically referring to a bucket-shaped package with a sealed top or lid, which is used as a transport container for chemicals and industrial products.

Buckets are used for catching, holding, or carrying liquids and solids. Buckets may also be used for long-term food storage. As an obsolete unit of measurement, at least one source documents a 'bucket' as being equivalent to 4 imperial gallons (18 L; 4.8 US gal).

== See also ==
- Bobrinski Bucket
- Giberville bucket
- Bucket brigade
- Coal scuttle
- Mop
- Pail (container)
- There's a Hole in My Bucket
- Veronica Bucket
