= Musée de Normandie =

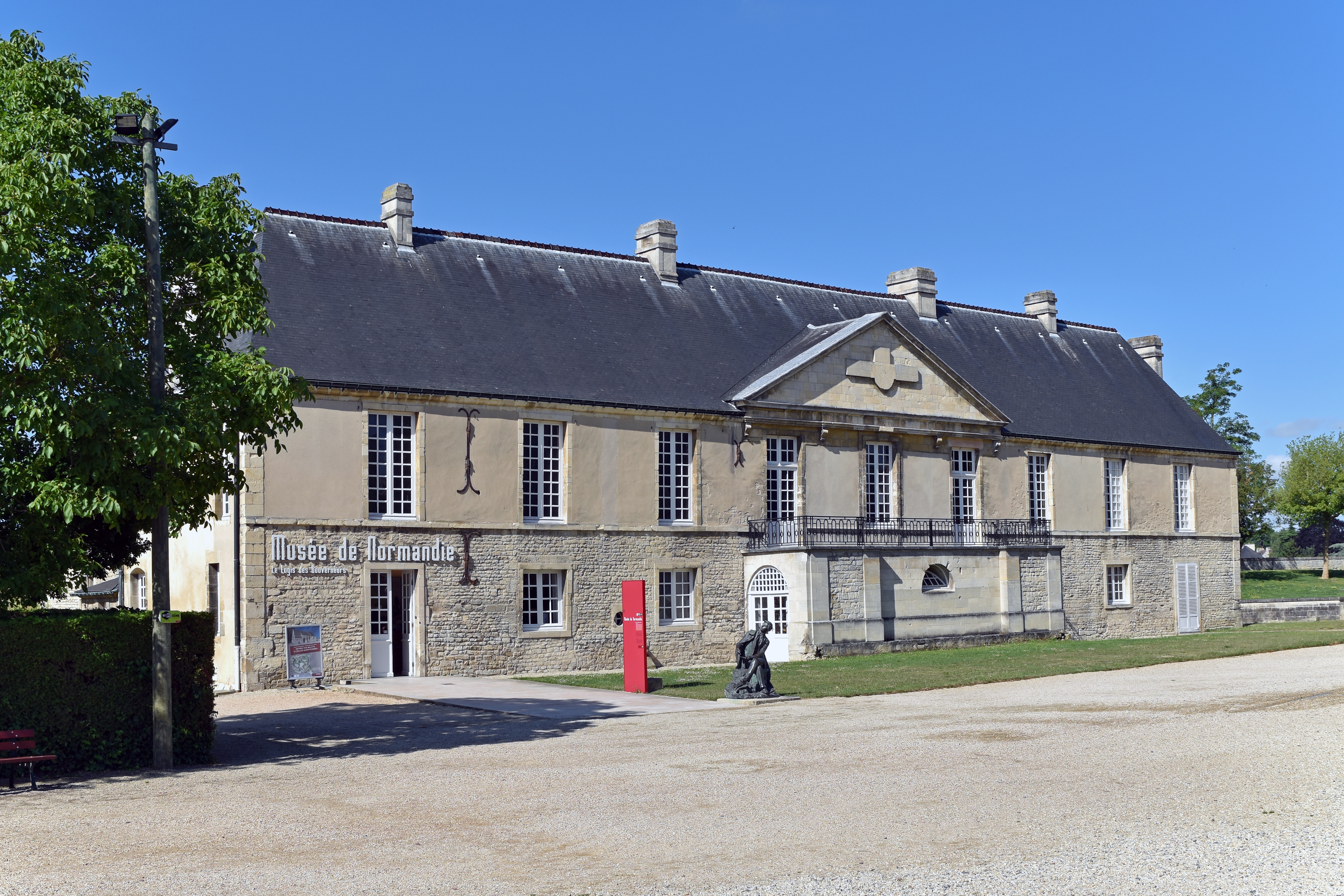
- Established: 1946
- Location: Caen, France
- Coordinates: 49.1857°N 0.3635°W
- Type: museum
- Collections: Archaeology, history and ethnography
- Visitors: 53,612 (2024)
- Founder: Georges Henri Rivière
- Director: Jean-Marie Levesque
- Owner: City of Caen (Ville de Caen)
- Public transit access: Château Quatrans, Caen tramway
- Website: https://musee-de-normandie.caen.fr/

The Musée de Normandie is a public museum in Caen, Normandy, France. It has been housed in the Château de Caen since 1963. In June 1970 the Musée des Beaux-Arts de Caen also moved into the castle, expanding the collection.

The founding of the museum goes back to Georges Henri Rivière, who wanted to set up a national network of regional museums in France in the 1930s. Soon after the Second World War had ended, in the summer of 1945, he was assessing the damage caused to public collections during the war. While passing through Caen, he gazed at the ruined city along with Michel de Boüard, professor of history at the University of Caen, and Jean Vergnet-Ruiz, inspector general of provincial museums. The idea of the museum was born as the discussions between these men took place.

Over time, the collection expanded, and now includes ancient as well as medieval items. The museum now holds more than 80,000 objects. Since 2016 the museum has exhibited the Treasure of Saint-Germain-de-Varreville, discovered in 2011, and the Treasure of Tourouvre.

== Logis des Gouverneurs ==
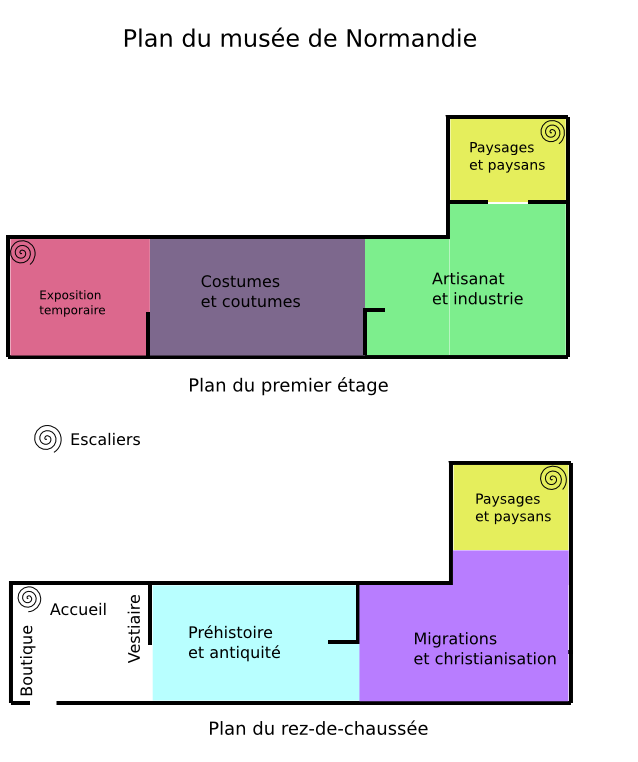
Plan of the Musée de Normandie's permanent collection in the Logis de Gouverneurs

The Logis des Gouverneurs (Governor's Residence) is the building in which the permanent collection of the Musée de Normandie resides. The building was probably constructed around the beginning of the 14th century as the residence of the bailli. The first written sources mentioning the building date back to 1338, and recent archaeological work has supported this dating. The building was substantially transformed in the 16th century with parts like the mullioned windows and staircase tower being added. In 1682 a major classical façade was added to the building by Pierre Cottard, architect to the King, on the orders of the Count of Coigny, the governor of the castle. It became part of the military administration of the castle and was used as military offices in the 19th century. The Logis became severely damaged after the bombing of Caen in 1944, after which reconstruction began. After major reconstructions, the Musée de Normandie opened its permanent collection inside the building in 1963. In 1978–1980 a modern northern wing and underground storage areas were added to the building.

== Salle des Remparts ==
The Salle des Remparts (Ramparts Hall) is a modern exhibition hall inside the castle, which is used for temporary exhibitions organised by the Musée de Normandie. The current hall is built on the site of the cavalier d'artillerie (artillery terrace), which was built on an embankment in the 16th century. The contemporary exhibition hall was built around 2004–2008 alongside a restoration of the northern, eastern and southern ramparts. Architects specifically incorporated elements of the surviving medieval and early modern elements rather than simply hiding them.

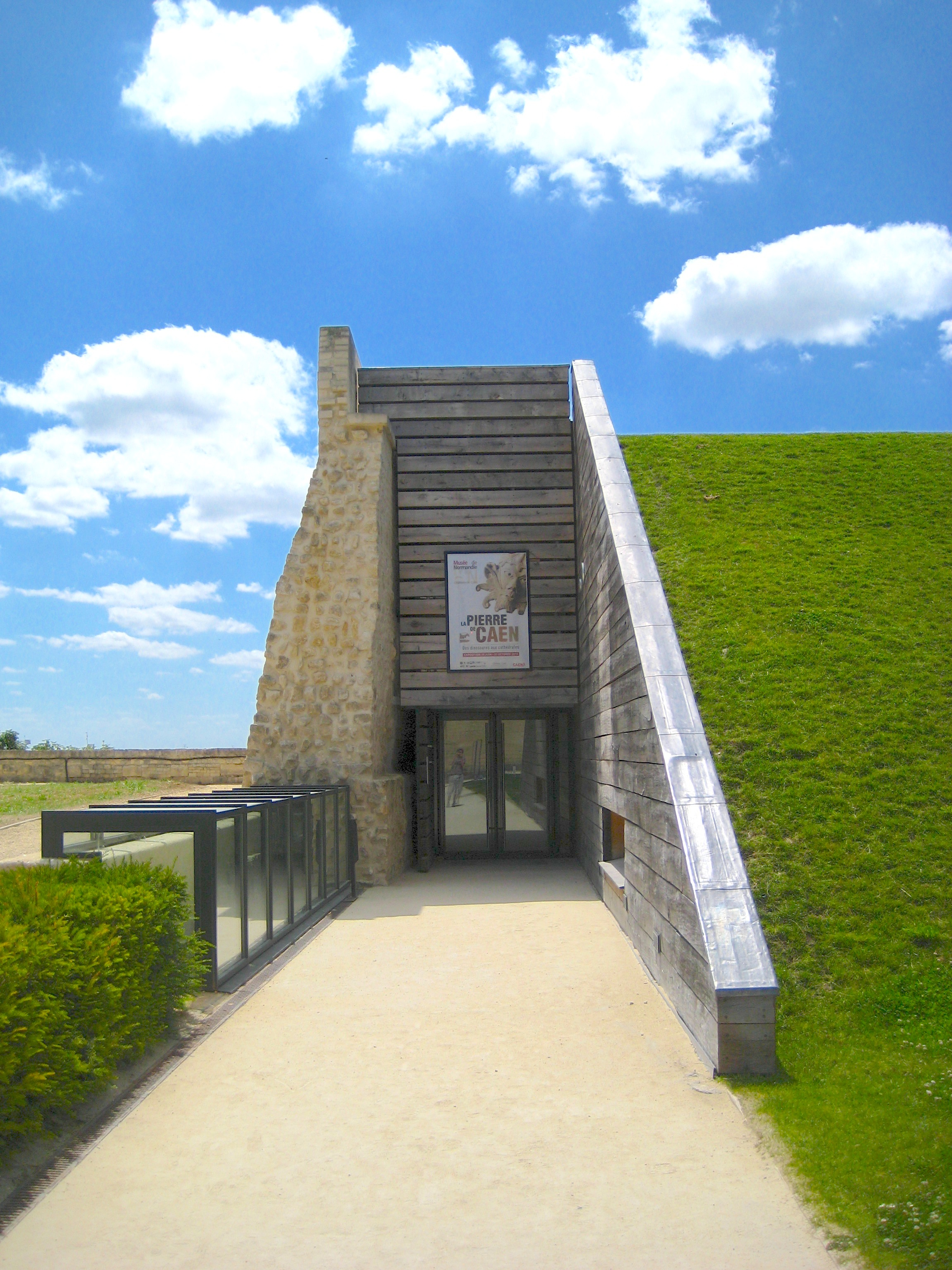
Entrance to the Salle des Remparts

== Collection ==
Ancient statue found in Calvados

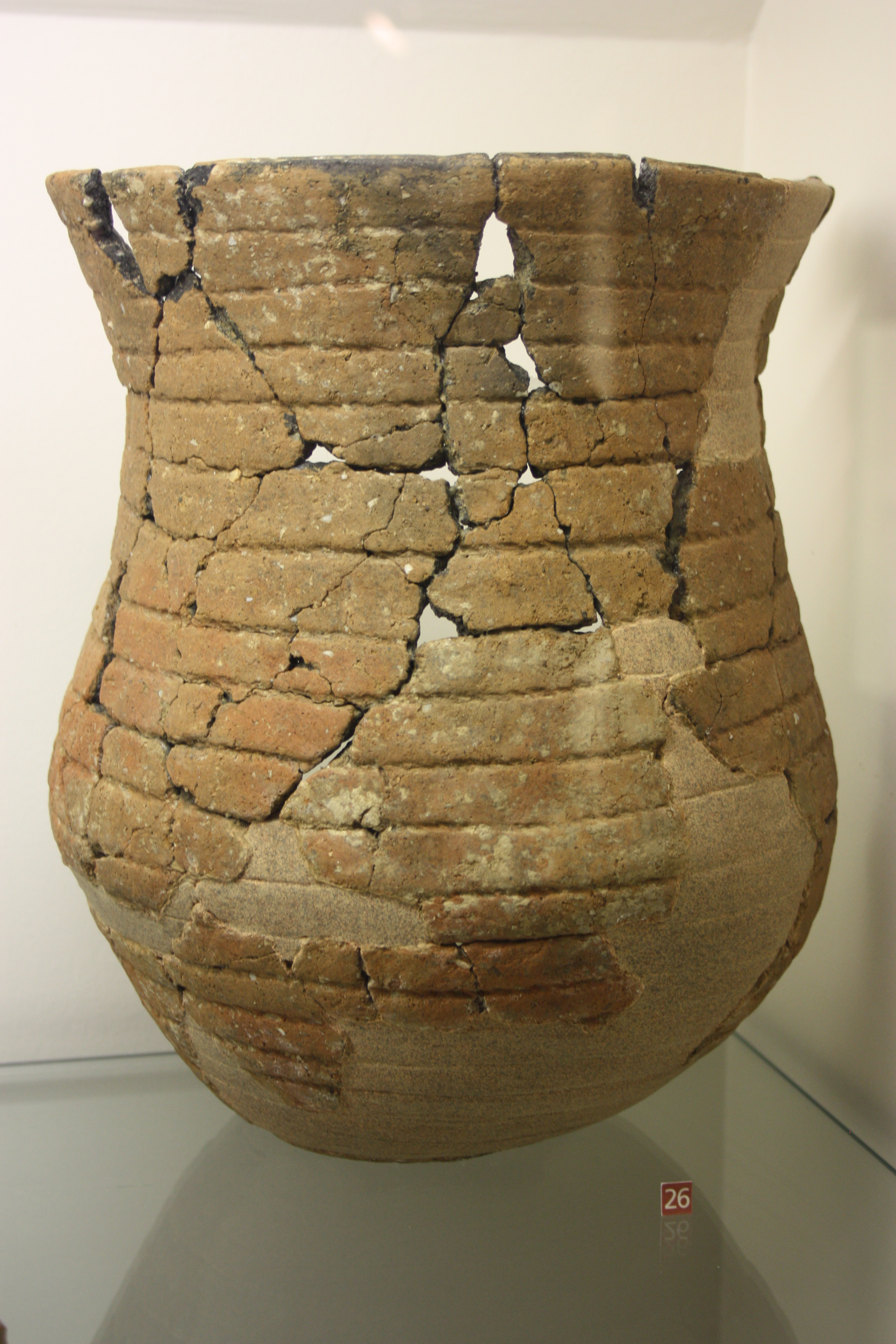
Striped vase

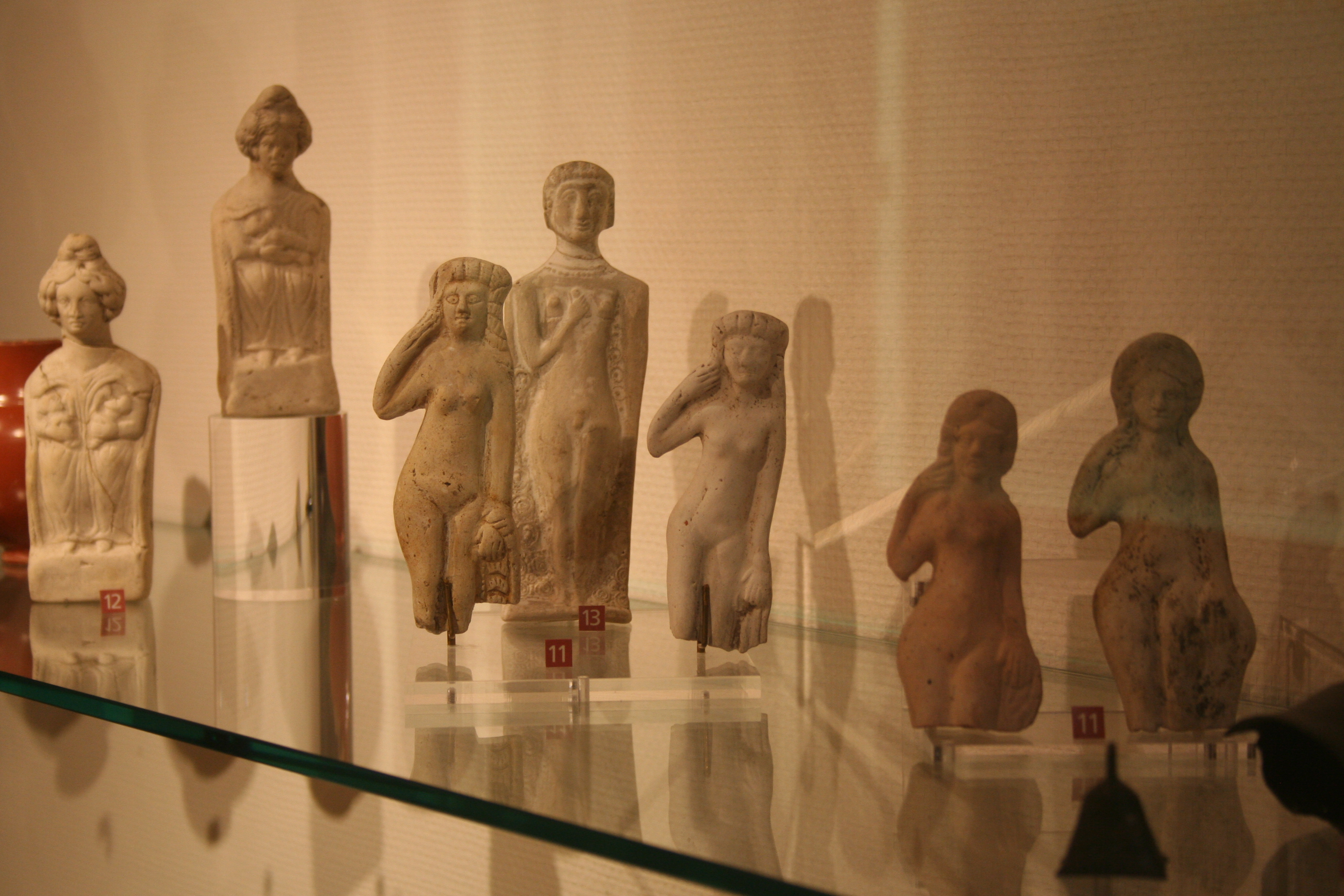
Terra cotta statuettes

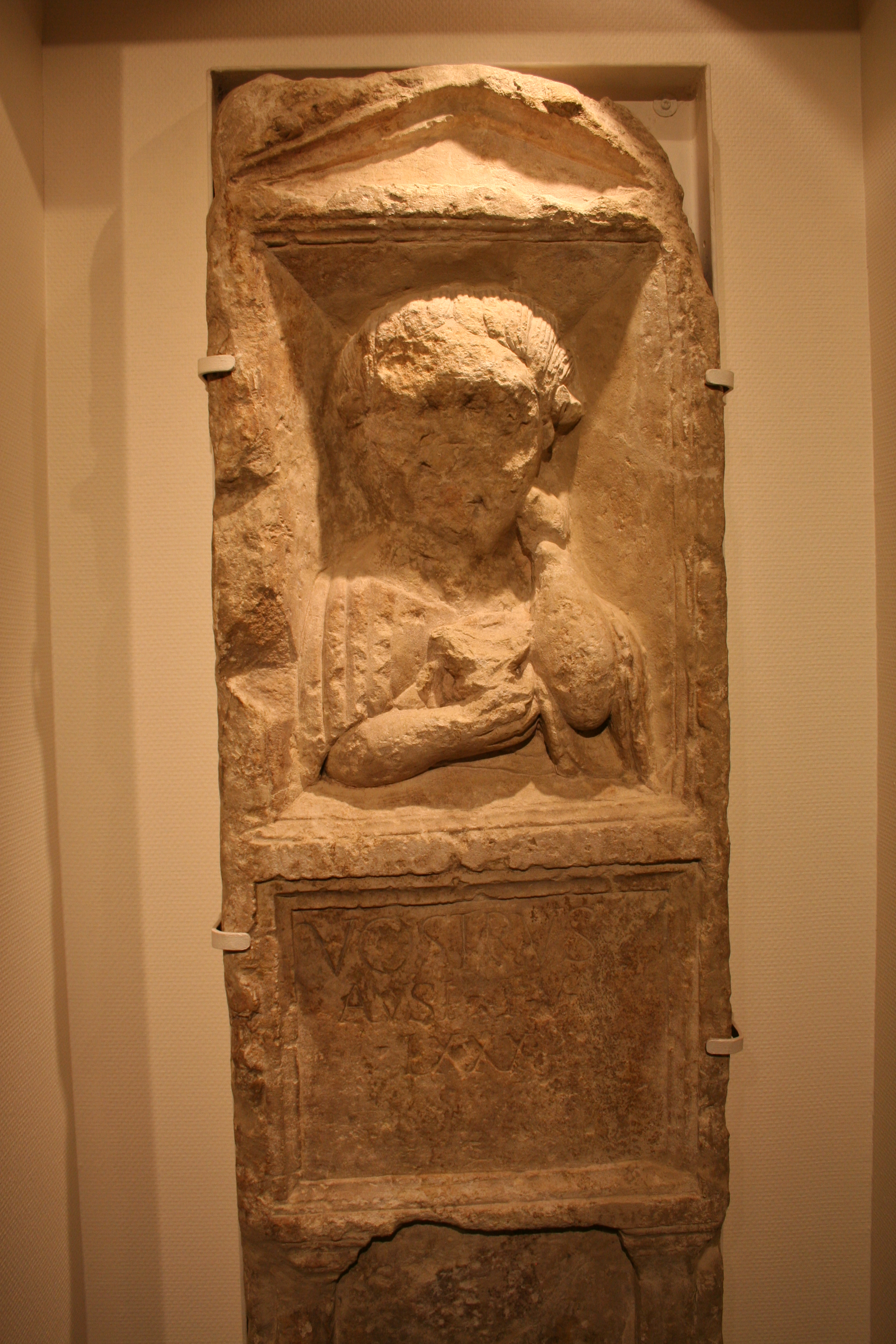
Depiction of Vostrus son of Ausus

== Sources ==
- Rémy Desquesnes, Caen 1900–2000: un siècle de vie, Fécamp, éditions des Falaises, 2001 ISBN 295073314X
- Jean-Yves Marin et Jean-Marie Levesque (dir.), Mémoires du château de Caen, Caen, Skira-Seuil, 2000 ISBN 8881187698
- Georges-Henri Rivière, Musée de Normandie: Ville de Caen, Caen, 1963.
