= Granville, Manche =

Granville
- Commune
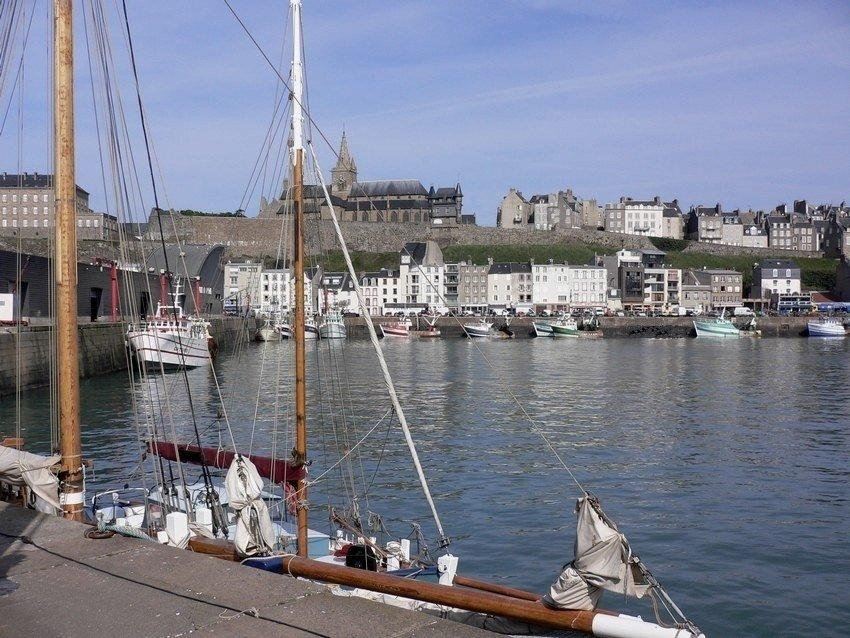
- The harbour of Granville, with Notre-Dame church in the background

- Coat of arms
- Location of Granville
- Location within France Location within Normandy
- Coordinates: 48°50′15″N 1°35′38″W
- Country: France
- Region: Normandy
- Department: Manche
- Arrondissement: Avranches
- Canton: Granville
- Intercommunality: Granville, Terre et Mer

Government
  - Mayor (2020–2026): Gilles Ménard
- Area^{1}: 9.9 km^{2} (3.8 sq mi)
- Elevation: 37 m (121 ft)
- Highest elevation: 67 m (220 ft)
- Lowest elevation: 0 m (0 ft)
- Population (2023): 12,510
  - Density: 1,300/km^{2} (3,300/sq mi)
- Time zone: UTC+01:00 (CET)
  - Summer (DST): UTC+02:00 (CEST)
- INSEE/Postal code: 50218 /50400
- ^{1} French Land Register data, which excludes lakes, ponds, glaciers > 1 km^{2} (0.386 sq mi or 247 acres) and river estuaries.

Granville (French pronunciation: [ɡʁɑ̃.vil]; Norman: Graunville) is a commune in the Manche department of Normandy, France. The chef-lieu of the canton of Granville and seat of the Communes of Granville, Terre et Mer, it is a seaside resort and health resort of Mont Saint-Michel Bay, at the end of the Côte des Havres, a former cod-fishing port and the first shellfish port of France. It is sometimes nicknamed "Monaco of the North" by virtue of its location on a rocky promontory.

The town was founded by a vassal of William the Conqueror on land occupied by the Vikings in the 11th century. The old privateer city and fortification for the defence of Mont Saint-Michel became a seaside resort in the 19th century which was frequented by many artists and equipped with a golf course and a horse racing course.

Home of the Dior family of industrialists, an important commune that absorbed the village of Saint-Nicolas-près-Granville in 1962, port and airport of South Manche, it has also been a Douzelage city since 1991, twinned with 20 European cities. Administratively, the islands of Chausey, the French Channel Islands, which include a small harbour, are part of the commune of Granville.

== Geography ==
=== Location ===
Granville is located at the edge of the English Channel at the extremity of the natural region of the Cotentin. It defines the north of the Bay of Mont Saint-Michel and the south of the Côte des Havres. The upper town is located on a peninsula surrounded by schist cliffs, known as Pointe du Roc or Cap Lihou. The rest of the town extends eastward inland, bounded on the north by the River Boscq, and on the south by alternating cliffs and beaches up to the Saigue stream.

The commune has four sand beaches, one to the north between the peninsula and the river, three to the south on the bay. It occupies 990 acres (400 ha); of mostly urbanised territory, but this urbanisation is now limited by the Natura 2000 European directive and the law of preservation of the coastline. The town is part of the French association law of 1901 of Les Plus Beaux Détours de France. The National Institute of Geographic Information and Forestry gives the co-ordinates as 48°50′17″N 1°35′13″W. It is at the centre of the Urban Area of Granville

Closing in the north of the Bay of Mont Saint-Michel and its foreshore of a very gentle gradient, it enjoys the highest tides in Europe, up to 14 m (46 ft) of tidal range. This situation also sometimes leads to significant changes of the coastal features of the nearby beaches.

Off the coast, the archipelago of the Chausey Islands is administered by the commune of Granville. It is one of the only island quarters of France. It consists of 52 islands of granite at high tide and more than 365 at low tide covering almost 5,000 ha (12,000 acres).

Granville is located 17 km (11 mi) southwest of its insular district of Chausey, 288 km (179 mi) to the west of Notre-Dame in Paris, point zero of the roads of France, 40 km (25 mi) southwest of Saint-Lô, 24 km (15 mi) northwest of Avranches, 27 km (17 mi) southwest of Coutances, 90 km (56 mi) to the south of Cherbourg-Octeville, 23 km (14 mi) north of Mont Saint-Michel, 26 km (16 mi) northeast of Cancale and 99 km (62 mi) to the southwest of Caen.

It is also located 5,356 km (3,328 mi) from Granville in the State of New York, 6,053 km (3,761 mi) from Granville, West Virginia and 6,196 km (3,850 mi) from Granville, Ohio, among others.

=== Hydrography ===
Granville has natural limits materialised by the Boscq river to the north and the Saigue stream in the south. For a few years, an artificial river pierced between the mainland and the peninsula. It was filled and is now replaced by Place du Maréchal-Foch.

=== Relief ===
The commune is largely at sea level. It rises only towards the interior, a little more on the peninsula from the Pointe du Roc to reach 67 m (220 ft).

=== Neighbouring communes ===
Granville, located on the Pointe du Roc is washed to the north, south and to the west by the English Channel. To the northeast lies the commune of Donville-les-Bains, the village of Yquelon is to the east and to the southeast are the small seaside resort of Saint-Pair-sur-Mer and the village of Saint-Planchers. The island quarter of Chausey is located off to the northwest, and Mont Saint-Michel is to the south.

=== Climate ===
Granville is located on the English Channel coast, it is therefore subject to an oceanic climate. However its positioning on the Bay of the Mont Saint-Michel, at the bottom of the gulf formed by Normandy and Brittany, allows it to be relatively protected from storms and wind (even though it may be exposed to the Suroît wind) and enjoy mild temperatures. Annual average temperature stood at 11.4 °C (52.5 °F) with a maximum of 14.2 °C (57.6 °F) and a minimum of 8.6 °C (47.5 °F). The maximum nominal temperatures of 21 °C (70 °F) in July–August and 3 °C (37 °F) in January–February show the mildness of the climate and the lack of thermal amplitude. The insolation values given here are those of the station of Caen, due to the lack of local data. Contrary to a common misconception, 606 mm (23.9 in) of total precipitation shows that Normandy is not a wetter region than others. The record of rainfall per 24-hour period was established during a storm on 11 July 1977 with 57.2 mm (2.25 in) of water.

In the 1987 storm, wind speeds reached a high of 220 km/h (140 mph; 120 kn), which is the current absolute record for the city.

Climate data for Granville-Longueville (2008–2020 normals, extremes 2008–present)
Month	Jan	Feb	Mar	Apr	May	Jun	Jul	Aug	Sep	Oct	Nov	Dec	Year
Record high °C (°F)	15.3 (59.5)	19.7 (67.5)	25.1 (77.2)	28.2 (82.8)	29.9 (85.8)	36.5 (97.7)	40.4 (104.7)	35.0 (95.0)	34.1 (93.4)	29.0 (84.2)	21.8 (71.2)	16.4 (61.5)	40.4 (104.7)
Mean daily maximum °C (°F)	8.9 (48.0)	9.6 (49.3)	12.0 (53.6)	15.3 (59.5)	17.4 (63.3)	20.4 (68.7)	22.4 (72.3)	21.9 (71.4)	20.4 (68.7)	16.8 (62.2)	12.9 (55.2)	10.1 (50.2)	15.7 (60.3)
Daily mean °C (°F)	6.0 (42.8)	6.4 (43.5)	8.2 (46.8)	10.7 (51.3)	13.1 (55.6)	16.3 (61.3)	18.2 (64.8)	18.0 (64.4)	16.1 (61.0)	13.3 (55.9)	9.8 (49.6)	7.2 (45.0)	11.9 (53.4)
Mean daily minimum °C (°F)	3.1 (37.6)	3.2 (37.8)	4.3 (39.7)	6.1 (43.0)	8.8 (47.8)	12.3 (54.1)	14.0 (57.2)	14.2 (57.6)	11.7 (53.1)	9.7 (49.5)	6.7 (44.1)	4.2 (39.6)	8.2 (46.8)
Record low °C (°F)	−11.3 (11.7)	−10.1 (13.8)	−6.9 (19.6)	−6.0 (21.2)	−2.7 (27.1)	3.0 (37.4)	4.2 (39.6)	4.4 (39.9)	0.2 (32.4)	−1.8 (28.8)	−7.8 (18.0)	−8.5 (16.7)	−11.3 (11.7)
Average precipitation mm (inches)	81.2 (3.20)	65.2 (2.57)	53.9 (2.12)	46.5 (1.83)	44.9 (1.77)	55.8 (2.20)	40.6 (1.60)	61.6 (2.43)	54.0 (2.13)	94.8 (3.73)	100.9 (3.97)	103.0 (4.06)	802.4 (31.59)
Average precipitation days (≥ 1.0 mm)	15.5	11.8	10.5	8.4	8.3	8.7	7.5	9.4	8.8	12.6	14.6	15.2	131.3
Source: Meteociel

=== Transport ===
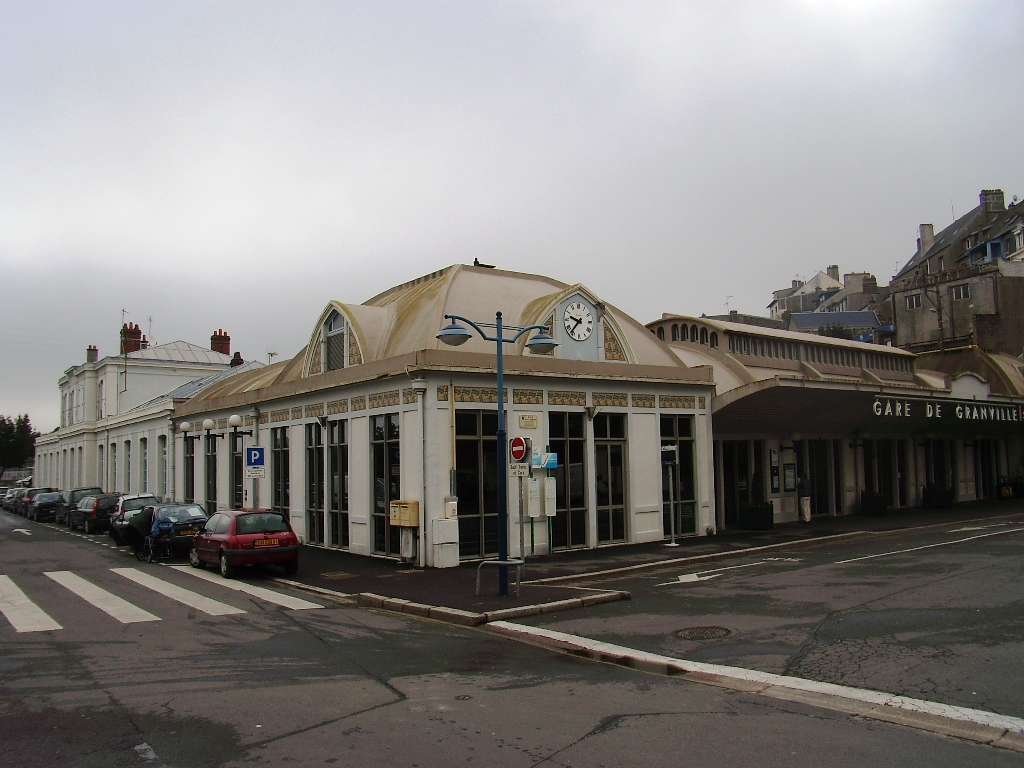
Granville railway station

Several highways serve the commune including the downgraded roads Route nationale 171 (now the RD 971 from Carentan), Route nationale 24-B (now the RD 924 towards Villedieu-les-Poêles) and Route nationale 173 (now the RD 973 from Avranches). Granville is located 25 km (16 mi) from the A84 (E401). It is also crossed from north to south by the old Route nationale 811, today the RD 911, the road to the coast at Avranches.

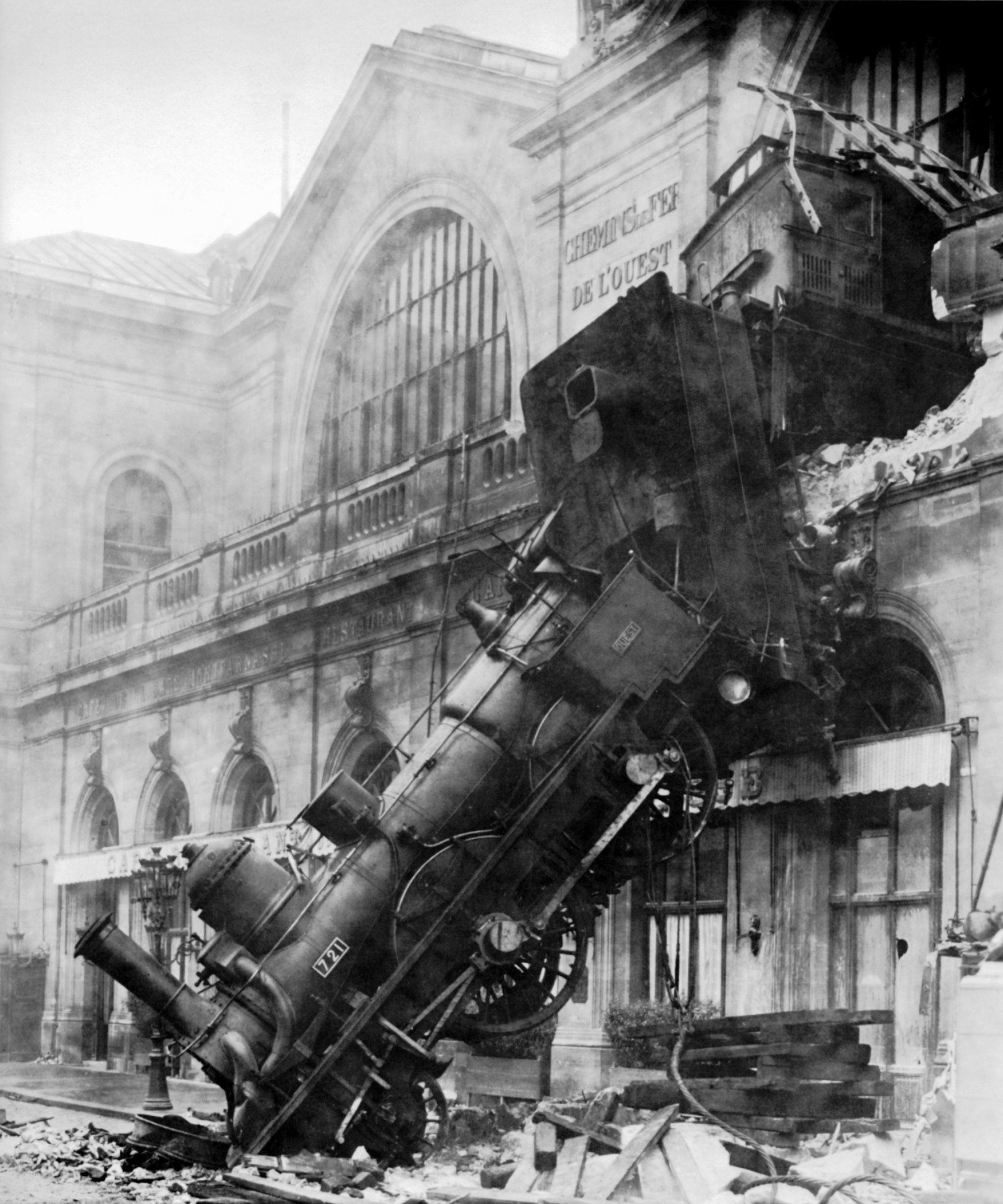
The Granville-Paris Express which overran the buffer stop at its Gare Montparnasse terminus on 22 October 1895

The Paris–Granville line departing from Paris-Montparnasse railway station has its terminus at Granville station; it is used by TER Normandie long and medium distance services.

Several bus routes connect Granville with a network set up by the General Council of Manche, Interurban network of Manche with routes 2, 3, 7, 116, 122, 202, 300, 302 and 305, and the Néva network since December 2014, created and operated in-house by the town of Granville.

The Granville-Mont-Saint-Michel Airport allows landings of private aircraft and the Caen – Carpiquet Airport ensures the interregional links.

By sea, the port of Granville serves the Chausey Islands and the Channel Islands (44,100 passengers) and hosts freight activities (197,000 tonnes).

An urban transport network is planned for 2014 and should cross the whole Community of Granville communes.

=== Quarters and localities ===
The commune is divided into several quarters: the Haute Ville, the historic heart behind the ramparts; Couraye; La Tranchée, which occupies the former site of an arm of the sea dug by man; Le Calvaire; Le Centre, the current town centre; and Saint-Nicolas, which corresponds to the former commune of Saint-Nicolas-près-Granville, joined in 1962. The quarter of the Agora has been classified priority in the title under the policy of the commune.

== Toponymy ==
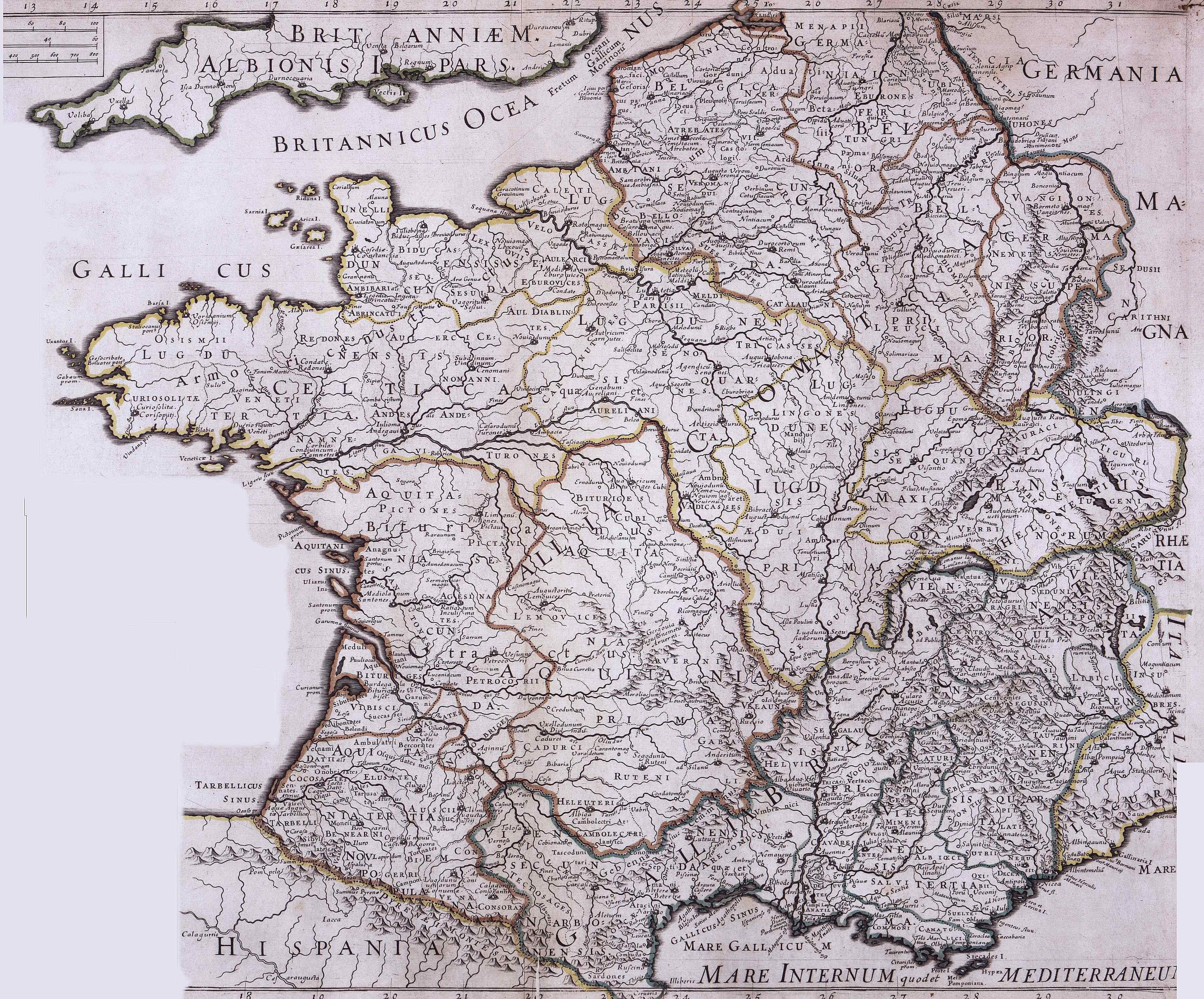
Map of Roman Gaul, established in the 18th century; Grannonũ (read Grannonum) appears above the territory of the Abrincatui.

The name of the city is mentioned in the forms of Grandivilla in 1054, Grande Villa in 1056, Grandvilla in 1172 and Granville in 1175.

All modern toponymists agree on the origin of the Gran- element: Albert Dauzat and Charles Rostaing have classed Granville with the toponyms of the Grandvelle/Grandville type, whose first term is explained just by the Old French grant ("grand"). François de Beaurepaire followed suit, as well as Ernest Nègre and René Lepelley.

According to Édouard Le Héricher ("Avranchin monumental and historic") the origin of the toponym is explained by a character named Grant who received the fief of Rollo of Normandy during the conquest of Neustria.

If experts agree all that it is a medieval formation of -ville, the exact meaning to give this suffix varies between "village, hamlet" (Albert Dauzat and Charles Rostaing, François de Beaurepaire, Ernest Nègre) and "domain" (René Lepelley) which should probably be in the sense of "rural area", initially it had the value of the Gallo-Roman VILLA.

Some historians and geographers of the past have attempted to connect Granville to the Grannonum/Grannona, toponym attested in the Notitia Dignitatum on the Saxon Shore from the late Roman Empire: tribunus cohortis primae Armoricanae, Grannona novae in litore Saxonico. This explains why some 18th-century maps describing the former Roman Gaul revealed the name of Grannonum at the location of Granville (see map opposite). This hypothesis is now abandoned by contemporary practitioners.

During the Revolution, the town temporarily took the name of Granville-la-Victoire (after the siege of the Vendéens she had victoriously endured in 1793), the name was then formalised without this complementary addition.

According to the standard Norman spelling developed in the second half of the 20th century, the name of the town is written as Graunville (French pronunciation: [ɡʁɑɔ̃vil]).

Cap Lihou is named from the Old Norse word holm meaning "island, islet" and which has in some cases evolved as -hou, as the endpoint.

== History ==
=== Origins ===
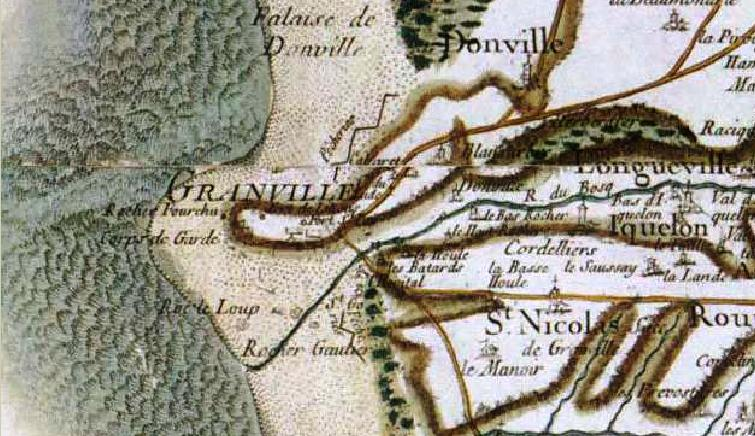
Granville on the Cassini map

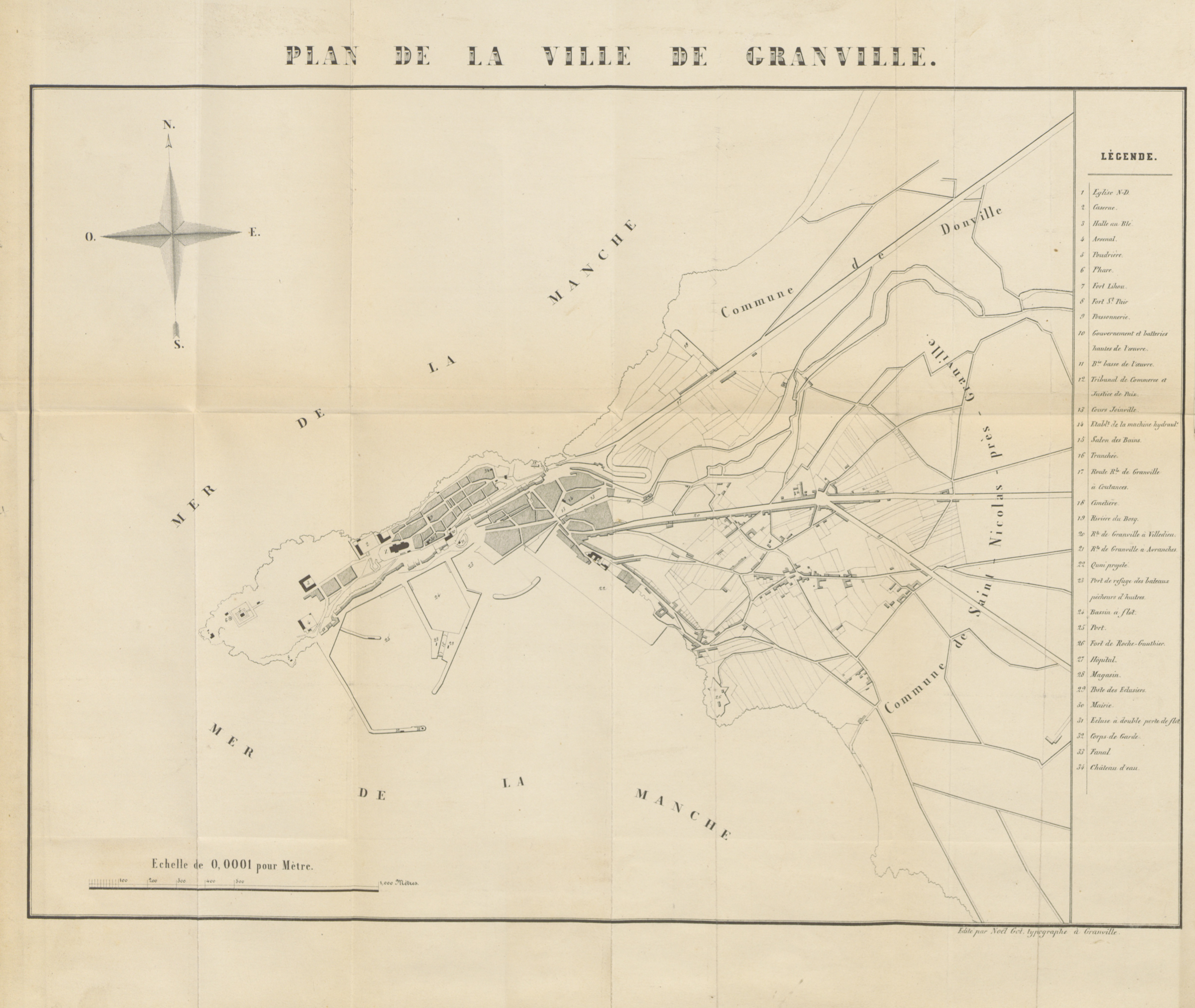
Granville in 1846

According to a legend concerning the Mont Saint-Michel Bay, Granville and the insular quarter of Chausey were covered in the Forest of Scissy, sunken in 709. Granville, in the heart of the land, would then become like Dinard and Saint-Malo a coastal town known as Roque de Lihou.

In 1066, William the Conqueror sought the help of the local Grant family during the Norman Conquest. As a token of recognition, he awarded the lands of Roque de Lihou. The Grants are therefore the first Lords of the town after the Vikings. In 1143, the parish of Notre-Dame was created. It is probable that monks from Mont-Saint-Michel went to the Priory on Lihou during the first half of the 12th century. In 1252, in the absence of a male descendant, Jeanne de Granville married Raoul d'Argouges, Lord of Gratot. In 1424, the criminal case of Pierre Le Maçon took place in Granville, which was then judged by the chancery of Henry VI of England in February 1425, in Paris. In 1439, the construction of the Notre-Dame du Cap Lihou Church began.

On 26 October 1439, English officer Sir Thomas de Scales, who served as the Seneschal of Normandy during the Hundred Years' War, bought the Roque of Jean d'Argouges. On the orders of Henry VI of England, in order to isolate Mont Saint-Michel, the last French bridgehead into Norman territory, he had the walls of Granville built. In 1440, the construction of the fortress began. To further protect this city, de Scales had a ditch dug between the peninsula and the mainland, so that the sea and the waters of the Boscq made the peninsula an island.

However, on 8 November 1442, by ruse, Louis d'Estouteville took over the castle since which has remained permanently in the hands of the French. Charles VII decided to make Granville a fortified town and signed a charter in 1445 granting arms and exempting the residents of tax. From 1450, ships were fishing at Newfoundland. In 1470, Louis XI visited the town to ensure its loyalty in the conflict opposing the Bretons and Burgundians. In 1492, the Jews of Spain, expelled by the Alhambra Decree, arrived in France. A community settled in Granville, their right to trade and to lend money allowed the town to arm a large fleet.

=== Early modern era ===
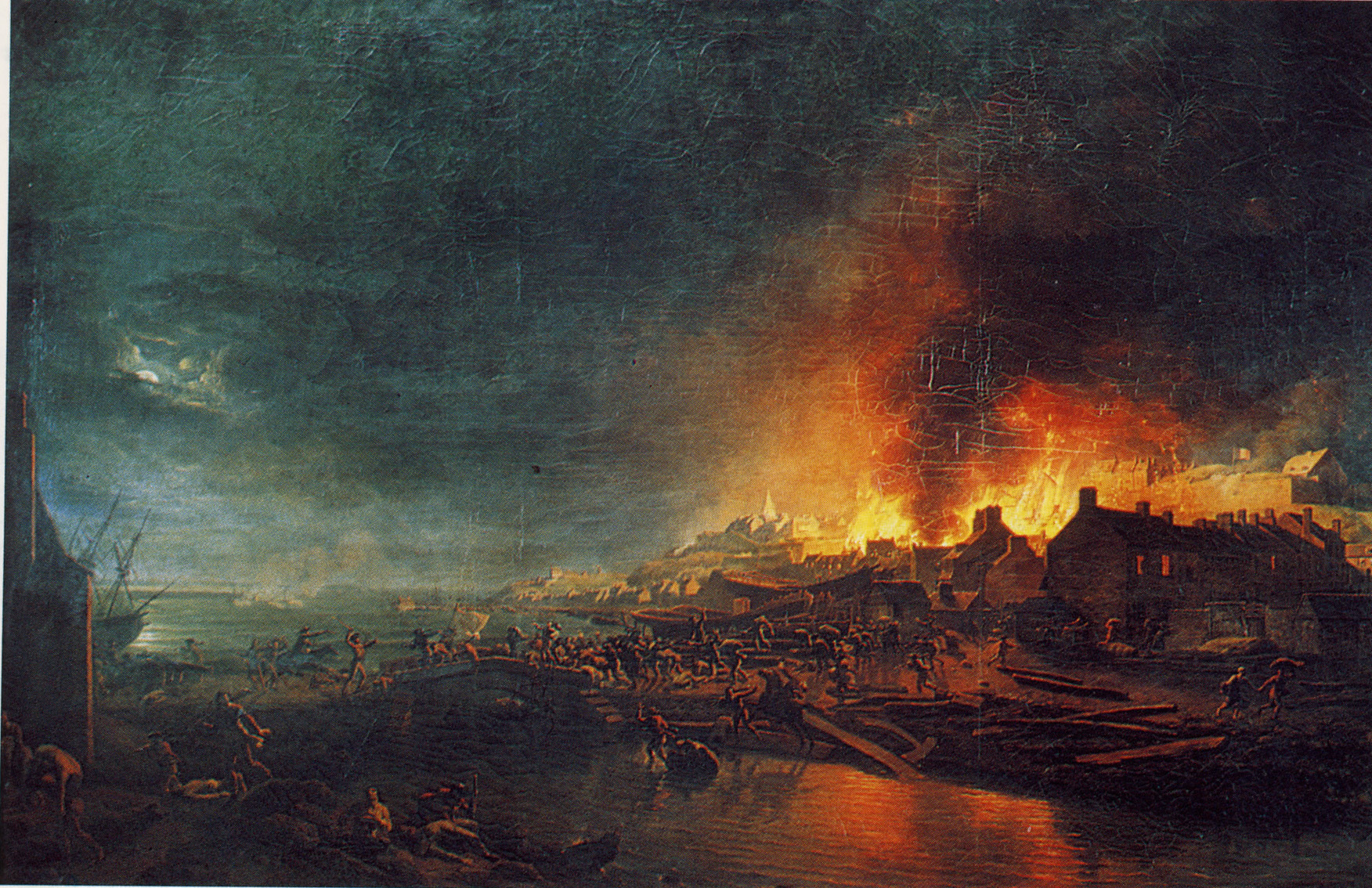
The burning of Granville by the Vendéens, painting by Jean-François Hue.

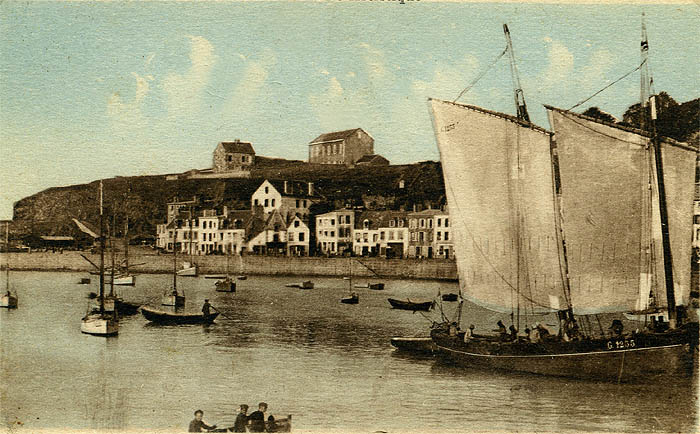
The port of Granville at the start of the 19th century

In 1562, the restoration of the ramparts began and a garrison moved into the barracks. Then in 1593 the keys to the city were presented to Henri IV, marking the importance of the town to the Kingdom. Under Louis XIII, the fortifications were adapted for artillery. From the reign of Louis XIV, Granville ships also had the right to capture. Therefore, between seventy and eighty ships were armed and Granville gave fifteen admirals to France, of which the best known is Georges René Le Peley de Pléville. In 1688, Louvois razed part of the defences of the town. Louis XIV appointed the first mayor of Granville in 1692: Luc Leboucher de Gastagny. On 8 July 1695, during the Nine Years' War, English Royal Navy warships led by John Benbow bombarded Granville for 8 hours using over 800 shells, destroying 27 of the town's houses. Vauban then studied possible improvements to the stronghold without having the time to carry them out.

Following the bombardment, the ramparts were raised and increased in 1720. Then, from 1749, development work and expansion of the port was undertaken, with, in 1750, the laying of the breakwater, ever-present today. This work was completed in 1757, in the meantime, a new barracks was built. In 1763, a fire swept through the faubourgs. In 1777, a new barracks was added, the Gênes barracks still present today. On 20 July 1786, a new fire broke out, this time in the Tranchée quarter at the gates of the citadel.

On 14 November 1793, or 24 brumaire year II, was the Siege of Granville by the Vendéens during the Virée de Galerne. A force of some 25,000 Vendéen troops (followed by thousands of civilians of all ages), commanded by Henri de la Rochejaquelein, headed for the port of Granville where they expected to be greeted by British warships and an army of Royalist exiles. Arriving at Granville, they found the walled city surrounded by Republican forces, with no British ships in sight. Their attempts to take the city were unsuccessful. During the retreat the extended columns fell prey to Republican forces. Repulsed by the population, having lost two thousand men, they had to abandon the assault but left by burning the Rue des Juifs. On 14 September 1803, the Royal Navy again bombarded the town after imposing a blockade of the coast.

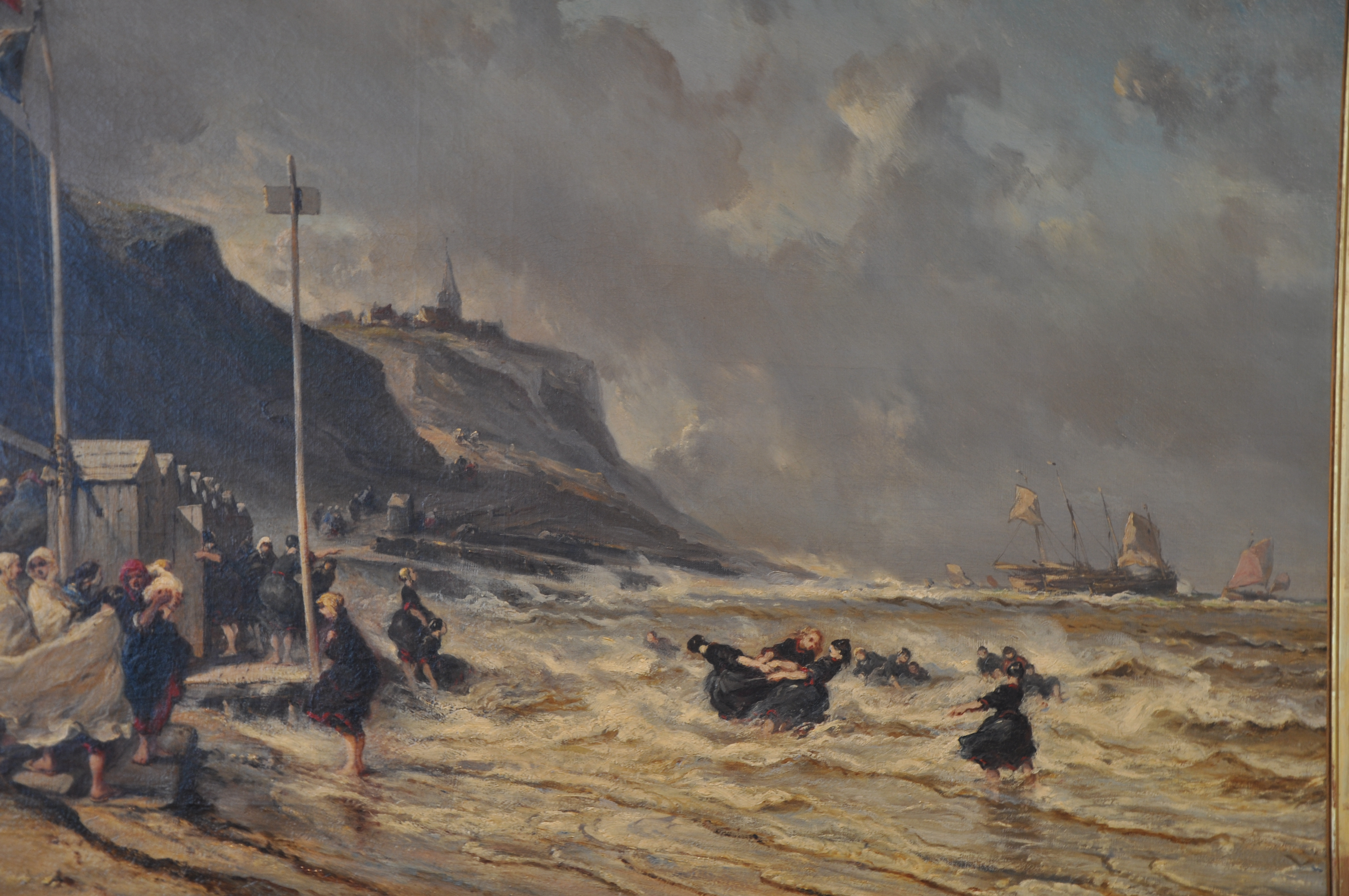
La Plage [The Beach] by Eugène Isabey, 1863

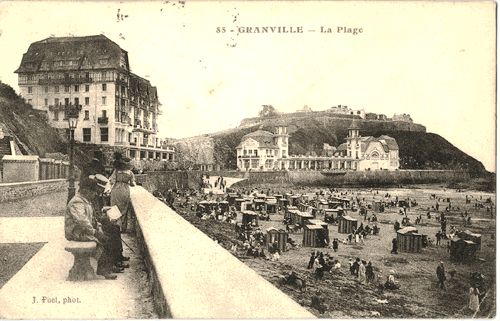
The beach of the Plat Gousset at the start of the 20th century

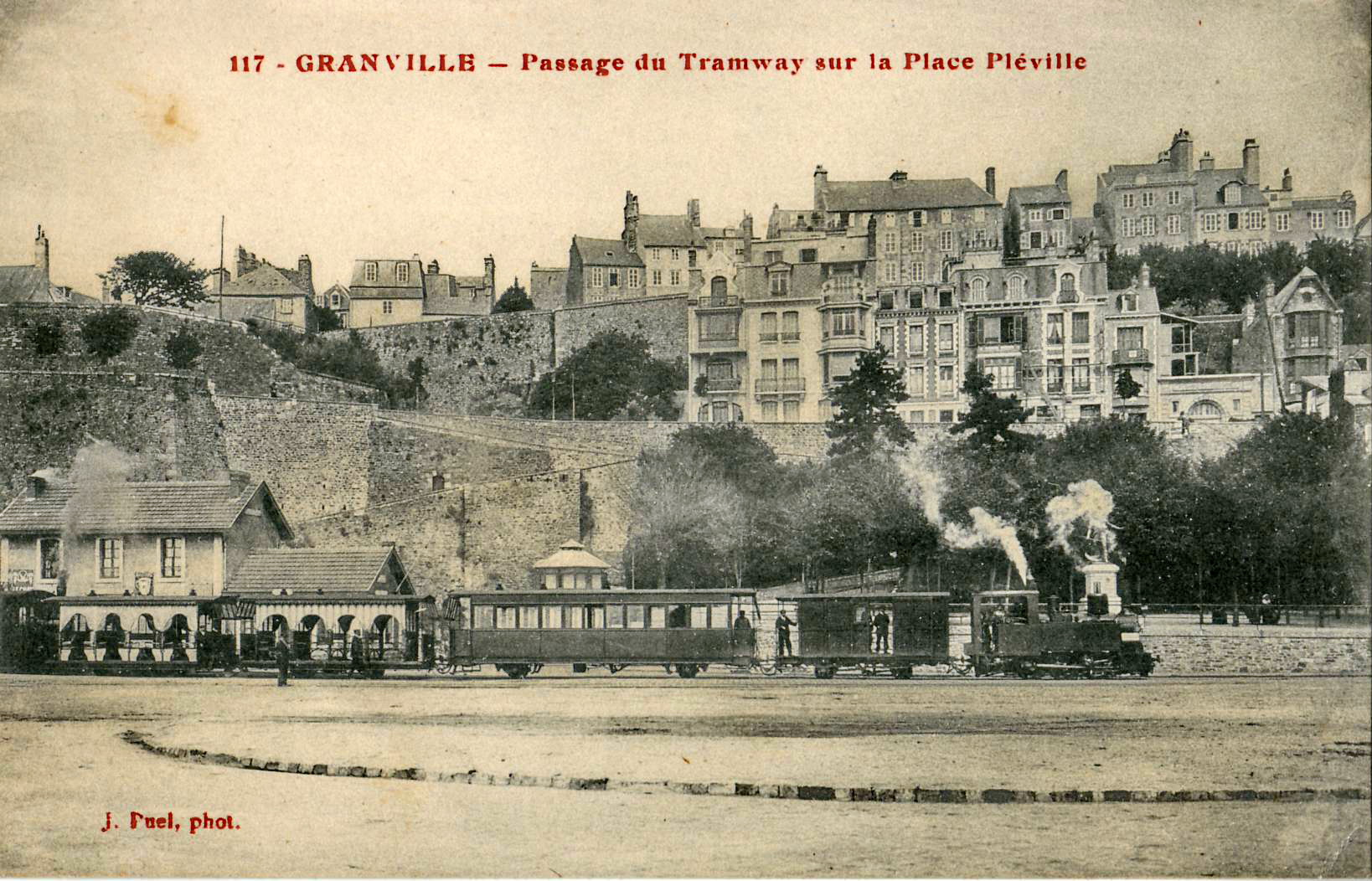
The railways of Manche circulated trains on the Granville–Sourdeval line and the Condé-sur-Vire–Granville line from 1908–1909 to 1936.

From 1815, after years of military conflict, in full Restoration, Granville seemed to take a new direction. The chamber of commerce and industry was created; in 1816, the shores of the Boscq baptised Cours Jonville; in 1823, the breakwater was joined to the land, and in 1827, the first stone of the Roc Lighthouse was laid.

Granville once formed part of the diocese of Coutances, the Parliament of Rouen and the intendance of Caen. Before the French Revolution, the town had two parishes: The Church of Notre-Dame du Cap Lihou and Saint-Nicolas. This parish was an appendix of Notre-Dame until Saint-Nicolas was set up in 1829 whose territory is regarded as a commune independent of Granville.

The port obtained its current appearance after 1856 and the inauguration of the wet dock and the lock. In 1860, the first wooden casino, built by former Mayor Méquin, was inaugurated. In 1865, it was followed by the hospice of St. Peter. In 1866, Victor Chesnais composed a hymn for his town, "La Granvillaise", adapted in 1868 at the theatre.

In 1867, the town acquired its first oared lifeboat, the Saint-Thomas-et-Saint-Joseph-de-Saint-Faron. In 1869, the newspaper Le Granvillais was created, and in 1870, the Paris–Granville line and Granville railway station were opened on 3 July. The town really became a seaside resort welcoming Parisians and guests such as Stendhal, Jules Michelet and Victor Hugo, and the parents of Maurice Denis who was born "accidentally" in Granville.

From 1875, major construction resumed, with the construction of a reservoir of 1,200 m^{3} (42,000 cu ft), Polotsk and Solferino barracks, and of the auction market hall. The town continued to equip itself with the opening in 1884 of the municipal library, in 1886 the school group of St. Paul, in 1888 Granville Graving Dock and in 1897 a corps of firefighters. To entertain holidaymakers, the Granvillaises Regatta Society was founded in 1889, the horse racing course and the Société des Courses of Granville in 1890, and the golf course in 1912. The Montparnasse derailment was on 22 October 1895, when the Granville–Paris express train overran the buffers at Paris Montparnasse station. Finally, in 1898, the St. Paul Church was inaugurated.

The 20th century began with the burning of the Château de la Crête in 1900. In 1905, fashion designer Christian Dior was born in Granville; his childhood home is now a museum. In 1908, the town was endowed with a visitor centre. It also became a centre of communication with the opening in 1908 of the railway line and tramway of Granville to Sourdeval, passing through Avranches, and one towards Condé-sur-Vire in 1910. In 1911, the new casino was opened, with the maternity hospital and the savings bank by minister Jules Pams. In 1912, electricity was installed in the commune and the Normandy-Hôtel was inaugurated. 1914 was a dark year for Granville with the loss of four sailors in the lifeboat accident of the Admiral-Amédée-Roze and departure for the war of the soldiers of the 2e régiment d'infanterie|2nd Infantry Regiment and 202nd infantry regiment.

After the war, the regatta resumed in 1919, the carnival in 1920 and a son of the area, Lucien Dior, became Minister of Commerce in the seventh government of Aristide Briand and came to visit the town in 1921. In 1925, a new railway station was inaugurated, Granville became a health resort and the Hôtel des Bains opened in 1926. In 1931, the last fishing vessel returned from Newfoundland.

=== World War II ===
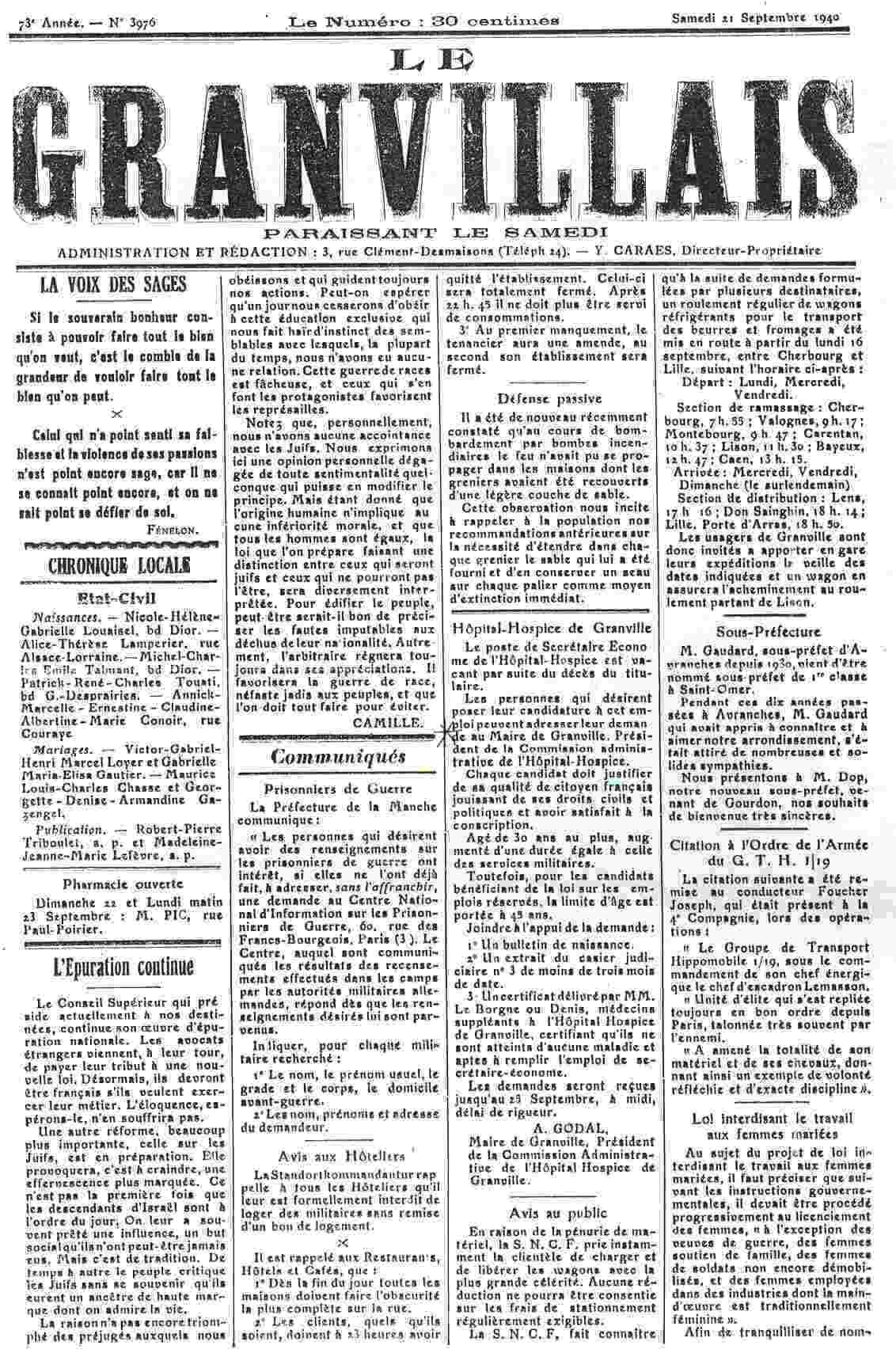
The page of the newspaper Le Granvillais of 21 September 1940, on which appears the article signed "Camille", denouncing the racist laws of the Vichy government.

A garrison and coastal town closing the Bay of Mont Saint-Michel, Granville has always been coveted during armed conflicts in the area. During the Second World War, on 17 June 1940, the Germans entered Granville. On 21 September 1941, an article appeared in Le Granvillais signed by the name of "Camille", where the author was alerting readers to the dangers and lack of basis for the next laws on the status of Jews of the Vichy regime. Despite this mark of resistance, eight Granville Jews were deported to Auschwitz: Léon Bobulesco and his two sons Armand and Rodolphe, Simon Goldenberg, his wife Minka and their children Henri and Ruben, as well as Smil Weesler. Three Communists suffered the same fate: Léon Lamort, René Loncle and Charles Passot.

The whole of the population underwent the constraints of the Occupation. From the beginning, the Germans built fortifications on the Pointe du Roc and forbade access to the port. On 20 May 1942, a new municipal council was installed by the prefect. On 1 April 1943, all of the Haute-Ville had to be evacuated, barriers and anti-tank roadblocks prevented access. The Normandy Hotel was transformed into a kommandantur and a branch of the Gestapo.

A signature name of this period was Maurice Marland. Born on 12 February 1888 in Falaise, and a teacher of English, French and civics, he led a local resistance network. Notable in the town, in 1939, he organised the reception of Belgian refugees and the evacuation of British military personnel to England. Later, with Jules Leprince, they put escape routes to Jersey in place. Throughout the occupation, his relations enabled him to mount a clandestine intelligence network on port and rail facilities and enemy operations in the Channel Islands. Arrested and then released in 1941 and 1943, he nonetheless continued until 22 July 1944, when he was arrested and shot by German forces in the forest of Lucerne at the request of French collaborators. On 23 July 1994, his son Serge Marland filed a complaint with the French government, which concluded that he was murdered by the Germans. Today, the secondary school of the commune bears his name.

On 6 June 1944, the "Green Plan" of sabotage of railway lines was implemented to cut the Paris–Granville line. Liberated without fighting on 31 July 1944, it saw the troops of General Patton pass for two days, who went down to the town centre by the Coutances road and up the Rue Couraye to get out by the Avranches road. The vibration caused by the passage of armoured cars for two days brought down the façade nameplates of several houses.

Granville was reoccupied for a few hours, during the Granville Raid of 9 March 1945, by German soldiers who had landed from Jersey. On 9 March 1945, while France was liberated and Allied troops, 800 km (500 mi) away, had begun to cross the Rhine, German troops based in still-occupied Jersey launched a daring commando raid against Granville. Although spotted by the radar of Coutainville, the Germans, using light boats, managed to land at night in the port of Granville. They dynamited port facilities and sank four freighters. Fifteen U.S., eight British and six French servicemembers were killed, seventy German prisoners of war were freed and five American and four British servicemembers were captured before the Germans retreated.

=== Contemporary history ===
During the Algerian War, the barracks housed the 3rd Demi-brigade, and then the 21st Battalion of chasseurs on foot, from 1956 to 1961. It was a training centre for thousands of contingent recruits before leaving for Kabylie or the region of Tiaret. The commune hosted the finish of stage 1 and the start of stage 2 of the 1957 Tour de France.

In 1962, the town of Granville absorbed the commune of Saint-Nicolas-près-Granville; the latter, during the revolutionary period of the National Convention (1792–1795), bore the name Champ-Libre [Free Field]. On 4 June 1965, Granville welcomed Prime Minister Georges Pompidou.

In 1970, the Regional Nautical Centre moved to Granville and in 1975, the port was completed with a marina. In 1972, the Chamber of Commerce and Industry of Granville, founded in 1815, took the name CCI Granville-Saint-Lô, and which then became the Chamber of Commerce and Industry of Central and South Manche in 2000. In 1973, Heudebert opened a factory for the production of biscottes, in business ever since.

In the 1980s, donations by Richard Anacréon allowed the opening of the Museum of modern art, many buildings in the town were classified or registered as historical monuments. In 1982, the town was endowed of a new hospital. In 1984, the military regiments left the barracks, allowing redevelopment of the Pointe du Roc.

In 1991, the Christian Dior Museum opened (Villa Les Rhumbs) and the Charter of the Douzelage was signed.

At the turn of the millennium, the business incubator emerged. In 2003, the A84 autoroute joined Granville with other agglomerations.

== Demography ==
=== Demographic evolution ===
The inhabitants of the commune are called Granvillais in French.

Of 6,649 people at the beginning of the census of the people in 1793, the commune reached a demographic peak in 1861 with 17,180 inhabitants, prior to be severely affected by the War of 1870 by losing nearly 1,000 of its children. Then began a slow decline accentuated by the World War I, no longer accommodating more than 10,132 inhabitants in 1946. The second half of the 20th century – with the absorption of Saint-Nicolas-près-Granville in 1962, the rural exodus and the construction of many estates on the outskirts – allowed the commune to gain residents again to achieve 13,022 inhabitants in 2006. That same year, only 0.5% of the Granville population was foreign, with the presence small Portuguese, Spanish and Moroccan communities each representing 0.1% of the population, far from the regional average of 8.8%, and 16.9% of households consisted of single-parent families, ten points under this same regional average.

Historical population

Year	Pop.	±% p.a.
1793	6,649	—
1800	5,454	−2.79%
1806	7,834	+6.22%
1821	7,030	−0.72%
1831	7,350	+0.45%
1836	7,581	+0.62%
1841	8,347	+1.94%
1846	12,191	+7.87%
1851	11,035	−1.97%
1856	13,568	+4.22%
1861	17,180	+4.83%
1866	15,622	−1.88%
1872	14,747	−0.96%

Year	Pop.	±% p.a.
1876	12,527	−4.00%
1881	11,040	−2.50%
1886	11,620	+1.03%
1891	12,721	+1.83%
1896	12,005	−1.15%
1901	11,667	−0.57%
1906	11,940	+0.46%
1911	11,347	−1.01%
1921	9,489	−1.77%
1926	10,497	+2.04%
1931	10,229	−0.52%
1936	10,329	+0.19%
1946	10,132	−0.19%

Year	Pop.	±% p.a.
1954	10,368	+0.29%
1962	9,827	−0.67%
1968	12,715	+4.39%
1975	13,330	+0.68%
1982	13,546	+0.23%
1990	12,413	−1.09%
1999	12,687	+0.24%
2007	13,100	+0.40%
2012	13,021	−0.12%
2017	12,580	−0.69%
2023	12,510	−0.09%

From 1962 to 1999: Population without double counting; for the years following: municipal population.
Source: Ldh/EHESS/Cassini until 1999 and INSEE (1968–2023)

=== Age structure ===
As reflected in the age structure, Granville is an exemplary commune in terms of the age distribution of its inhabitants, each category representing around 15 to 20% of the population. Only the centenarians are poorly represented, as on the whole of the territory. However, a lower rate of children under 15 years in 2006 reflected an ageing of Granville families and a possible future demographic deficit. That same year, only 25.9% of the population was less than 25 years old.

Population by age of Granville, 2012 (%)

90+	2.05
75–89	14.9
60–74	21.3
45–59	18.45
30–44	14.35
15–29	16.25
0–14	12.7

Total: 100

male

female

Source: INSEE

Population by age of Manche, 2012 (%)

90+	1.05
75–89	10.6
60–74	16.55
45–59	21.1
30–44	17.7
15–29	15.45
0–14	17.55

Total: 100

male

female

Source: INSEE

== Politics and administration ==
=== Local politics ===
Granville is the chef-lieu of the canton represented by the centre-right departmental councillor Jean-Marc Julienne. The commune is linked to Manche's 2nd constituency represented by deputy Guénhaël Huet (UMP).

Thirty-three elected officials sit on the municipal council, divided into twenty-four members of the municipal majority from a list of independents, a group of five councillors of a UDI list, three elected leftists including former PRG mayor Daniel Caruhel and an elected frontist. The board is chaired by a woman, Dominique Baudry, assisted by nine adjoints.

Granville is attached to courts of first instance and the superior court of Avranches, the courts and tribunals of commerce and Council of Tribunals of Coutances, the Court of Appeal of Caen.

In 2008, the town had a budget of €30.041 million, of which €22.08 million for operations and €7,961,000 investment, 38.39% funded by local taxes, municipal debt was €15,318,000 the same year. The tax rate in 2008 amounted to 13.12% for the housing tax, 22.06% and 47.53% for property tax (built and unbuilt), and 14.30% for business tax set by the Community of Granville communes. Two young workers' homes have settled in the town, an HLM management company manages 1563 homes in the town, a social action community centre provides aid to people in need.

The town adheres to the Community of communes of Granville, land and sea for land use, economic development and housing, upgrading of the environment, and the organisation of relief. It also directs the SMBCG (Joint Association of Granville coastal areas) for the protection of coastal waters against microbiological risk.

=== List of mayors ===
Sixty-eight mayors have headed the municipal administration of Granville, since the election of the first mayor in 1692.

List of mayors of Granville, 1945–present
Start	End	Name	Party	Other details
1945	1947	Jules Desmonts	PRRRS	Honorary director of the Ferdinand Buisson College
1947	1959	Roger Maris	RPF then moderate	Retired colonial administrator
1959	1961	Marius Beaumois	PRRRS	Retired receiver-collector
1961	1977	Henri Baudouin	UNR then FNRI	Commercial court registered lawyer
1977	1983	Rémy Derubay	PS	Mathematics lecturer
1983	1989	Henri Baudouin	UDF	Commercial court registered lawyer
1989	1990	Jean-Claude Lecossais	RPR	Surgeon
1990	1994	Bernard Beck	UDF	Honorary magistrate, first President of the Court of Auditors from 1978 to 1982
1994	2008	Marc Verdier	RPR, UMP	Retired banker
2008	2014	Daniel Caruhel	PRG	Landscape gardener
April 2014	Present	Dominique Baudry	Independent	Business manager

List of mayors of Granville, 1692–1945
Start	End	Name	Party	Other details
1692	1706	Luc Leboucher de Gastigny	?	Lord of Gastigny
1706	1749	M. Gallien de Préval	?	Lord of Préval
1749	1756	Pigeon de Saint-Pair	?	?
1756	1758	M. Le Marié	?	Lord of Les Fontaines
1758	1759	Jacques-Louis Picquelin	?	?
1759	1759	M. Poisson de Jublain	?	?
1759	1761	M. Hugon	?	Lord of La Noë
1761	1762	M. Ganne de Grandmaison	?	Lord of Grandmaison
1762	1762	M. Hugon-Dupuis	?	?
1762	1765	René Perrée-Grandpièce	?	Lord of Grandpièce and Le Hamel
1765	1768	Michel Clément	?	?
1768	1771	M. Le Boucher	?	Lord of Vallesfleurs
1771	1771	Jacques Picquelin	?	?
1771	1776	M. Le Boucher	?	Lord of Vallesfleurs
1776	1778	M. Ganne de Grandmaison	?	Lord of Grandmaison
1778	1783	Nicolas Yset	?	?
1783	1787	Pierre-Nicolas Perrée	?	Legal negotiator and shipowner
1787	1790	M. Couraye-Duparc	?	?
1790	1791	Denis-François Le Mengnonnet	?	?
1791	1795	M. Hugon-Lacour	?	?
1795	1795	Denis-François Le Mengnonnet	?	?
1795	1795	M. Longueville-Beaufongeray	?	?
1795	1796	Antoine-Gaspard Gautier	?	?
1796	1797	Girard-Laporte	?	?
1797	1797	M. Deslandes	?	?
1797	1799	M. Le Pelley-Fonteny	?	?
1799	1800	Pierre Méquin	?	?
1800	1805	François-Thomas Le Tourneur	?	Former vessel lieutenant, shipowner
1805	1816	M. Méquin-Jonville	?	?
1816	1830	Pierre-François Le Mengnonnet	?	?
1830	1834	Hippolyte Abraham-Dubois		Notary, general councillor and deputy
1834	1841	François Vallée	?	?
1841	1848	Jacques-Edmond Le Campion	?	?
1848	1854	Antoine Boniface	?	?
1854	1861	Jacques-Edmond Le Campion	?	?
1861	1870	Charles Leclère	Bonapartist	Shipowner
1870	1871	Charles Malicorne	?	?
1871	1874	Arthur Le Mengnonnet	?	Shipowner
1874	1879	Joseph Beust	?	?
1879	1881	Godefroy Aubert	?	?
1881	1882	Arthur Le Prince	?	?
1882	1882	Godefroy Aubert	?	?
1882	1888	Émile Riotteau	Republican	Shipowner
1888	1890	François le Biez	?	?
1890	1892	Lucien Dior	?	Industrialist
1892	1902	Alexandre Bureau	?	?
1902	1904	Georges Beust	?	?
1904	1908	Auguste Require	?	?
1908	1911	M. Letourneur	?	Physician
1911	1919	Jean Pergeaux	?	?
1919	1923	Jacques de Boutray	?	?
1923	1925	Augustin Rufflé	?	?
1925	1929	Albert Godal	?	?
1929	1929	Augustin Rufflé	?	?
1932	1945	Albert Godal	?	?
1945	1945	Jules Desmonts	PRRS	Honorary director of the Ferdinand-Buisson College
1945	1945	M. Lavat	?	Physician

=== Political trends and results ===
In the context of the elections, the population of Granville shows a relatively conservative tendency and votes as regularly as the entire national population, thus following the "vague rose" [pink wave] in the regional elections of 2004, but instead voting by a large majority for the European Constitutional Treaty. An opposition group published a journal, Le Sans-culotte de Granville and Coutances. District committees are located in the commune to enliven the local debate. In 2008, the list led by the outgoing general counsel of the Miscellaneous left, Daniel Caruhel, ex-socialist but supported by outgoing UMP mayor, Marc Verdier, and housing nine members of the Miscellaneous right outgoing majority, won the municipal election against the official candidate of the Socialist Party. The canton returned to Jean-Marc Julienne, assistant Marc Verdier and running mate Daniel Caruhel, belonging to the New Centre but elected as independent. Thus, contrary to what the labels might suggest, Granville voters had once again made the choice of conservatism.

Presidential elections, results of the second round

- Presidential election, 2002: 86.65% for Jacques Chirac (RPR), 13.35% for Jean-Marie Le Pen (FN), 75.32% turnout.
- Presidential election, 2007: 52.42% for Nicolas Sarkozy (UMP), 47.58% for Ségolène Royal (PS), 82.27% turnout.
- Presidential election, 2012: 52.22% for François Hollande (PS), 47.78% for Nicolas Sarkozy (UMP), 78.97% turnout.

Parliamentary elections, results of the second round

- Parliamentary election, 2002: 54.24% for Alain Cousin (UMP), 45.76% for Daniele Jordan-Menninger (PS), 55.17% turnout.
- Parliamentary election, 2007: 54.48% for Alain Cousin (UMP), 45.52% for Daniele Jordan-Menninger (PS), 55.09% turnout.
- Parliamentary election, 2012: 50.19% for Guénhaël Huet (UMP), 49.81% for Gérard Saure (PRG), 55.29% turnout.

European elections, results from the two best scores

- European Parliament election, 2004: 31.92% for Henri Weber (PS), 19.08% for Tokia Saïfi (UMP), 43.76% turnout.
- European Parliament election, 2009: 31.12% for Dominique Riquet (UMP), 17.72% for Hélène Flautre (Europe Ecology), 41.13% turnout.

Regional elections, results from the two best scores

- Regional election, 2004: 50.42% for Philippe Duron (PS), 38.27% for René Garrec (UMP), 60.39% turnout.
- Regional election, 2010: 56.31% for Laurent Beauvais (PS), 43.69% for Jean-François Le Grand (UMP), 50.70% turnout.

Cantonal elections, results of the second round

- Cantonal elections, 2001: missing data.
- Cantonal elections, 2008: 53.63% for Jean-Marc Julienne (NC), 25.64 to François Heurguier (PS), 61.92% turnout.

Municipal elections, results of the second round

- Municipal elections, 2001: 51.53% for Marc Verdier (RPR) elected in the first round, 48.47% for Jean Leguelinel (PS), 53.98% turnout.
- Municipal elections, 2008: 49.48% for Daniel care (DVG), 28.59% for André June (DVG), 62.46% turnout.

Referendum elections

- Referendum of 2000 relating to the five-year presidential term: 73.39% for Yes, 26.61% for No, 31.83% turnout.
- Referendum of 2005 on the Treaty establishing a Constitution for Europe: 51.42% for Yes, 48.58% for No, 66.22% turnout.

=== Education ===
The commune was attached to the Academy of Caen. Four public kindergartens and primary schools welcome pupils of the commune: The Group of Docteur-Lanos, the Jean Macé Group, the Jules Ferry Group, and the Pierre and Marie Curie Group.

The commune also has the André Malraux College of general education and SEGPA.

The town has two high schools: Lycée Léon Julliot de la Morandière for general, technological and Baccalauréat professionnel|professional education, and the Maurice-Marland hotelier's school.

Added to these establishments is the Sévigné Institution, a private school with boarding school from kindergarten to high school, and the Notre Dame and St. Paul schools for kindergarten and elementary education.

The commune is one of the seats of the lt=CCI of Centre and South-Manche, it hosts a lt=GRETA, the group of Formation Inter-consulaires de la Manche [Inter-consular training of Manche] (FIM), an Institute of Nursing and the Family and Rural House, providing agricultural and commercial training.

Finally, the commune has a leisure centre for the reception of children out of school periods, a family crèche and a multi-host centre for young children.

Educational establishments in Granville

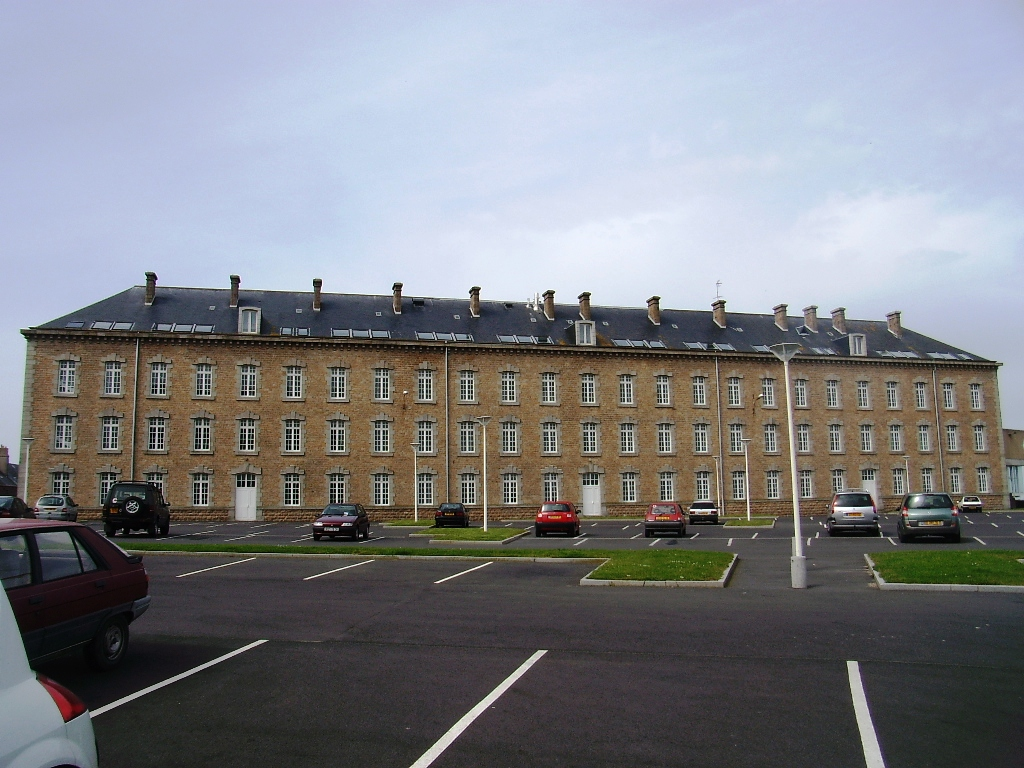
The André-Malraux College in the former Bazeilles barracks

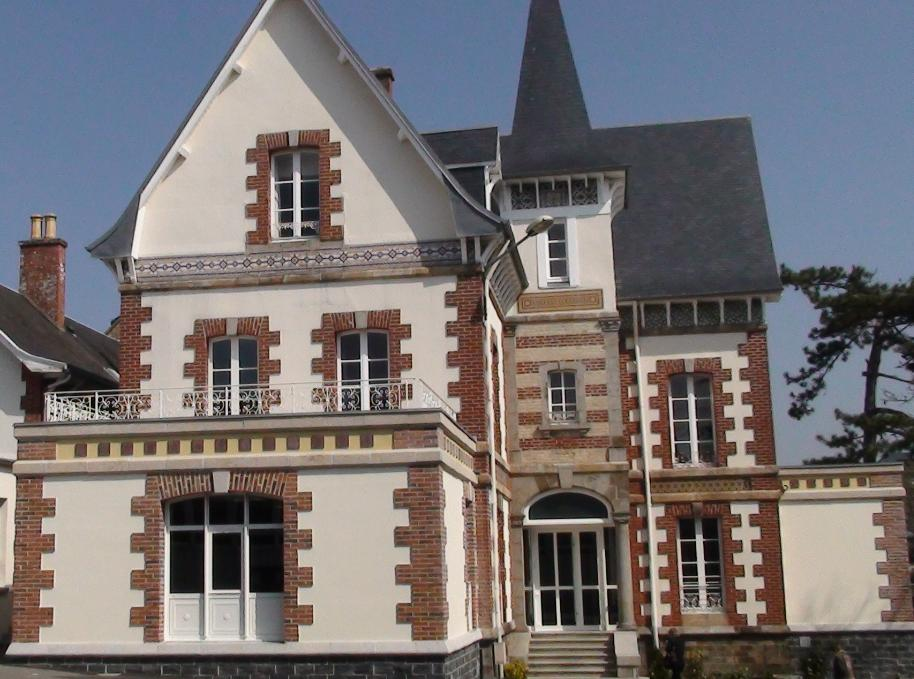
The Sévigné Institution

=== Health ===
The commune has on its territory, in association with Avranches, a medical center with a capacity of 742 beds, offering services of general medicine, surgery, gynaecology and obstetrics, cardiology and SMUR. The centre is also equipped with a scanner. In 2007, a ministerial decision endorsed the closure of the maternity of the communal hospital carrying 410 deliveries per year.

The commune also hosts on its territory a centre of re-education and rehabilitation, a centre of thalassotherapy, three Residential homes for elderly dependents, two health centres, 91 doctors, eight dentists and seven pharmacists.

Several medical or social associations are located on the commune, such as the Union of the Speech Therapists of Manche, the SNSM, the Rotary Club, the Red Cross and the Secours Populaire.

=== Public services ===
Granville welcomes the CCI of Centre and South-Manche, a CAF, a subdivision of the DDE, a centre of social security, a tax office and treasury, a gendarmerie barracks, a police station, a relief and fire centre, a customs office, a post office in the town centre and one in the quarter of Saint-Nicolas, agencies of ASSEDIC, ANPE and AFPA, an auction house and three notarial offices, two lawyers' offices attached to the bar of Avranches and a bailiff's office. The civil security has a base for monitoring the English Channel equipped with a Eurocopter EC145.

=== Twin towns – Sister cities ===
Granville has been twinned with Rivière-du-Loup, Quebec, at a distance of 4,859 km (3,019 mi), since 1984.

Granville is a founding member of the Douzelage, a unique town twinning association of 24 towns across the European Union. This active town twinning began in 1991 and there are regular events, such as a produce market from each of the other countries and festivals. Henry Haffray, initiator and founder of the douzelage was the first president of the Granville partenaire européen [Granville European partner] association, he was followed for more than a dozen years by Jean-Marc Julienne, then André Gendre and Pascale Vallée.

Members of the Douzelage

- Altea, Spain – 1991
- Bad Kötzting, Germany – 1991
- Bellagio, Italy – 1991
- (Republic of Ireland) Bundoran, Ireland – 1991
- Holstebro, Denmark – 1991
- Houffalize, Belgium – 1991
- Meerssen, the Netherlands – 1991
- Niederanven, Luxembourg – 1991
- Preveza, Greece – 1991
- Sesimbra, Portugal – 1991
- Sherborne, United Kingdom – 1991
- Karkkila, Finland – 1997
- Oxelösund, Sweden – 1998
- Judenburg, Austria – 1999
- Chojna, Poland – 2004
- Kőszeg, Hungary – 2004
- Sigulda, Latvia – 2004
- Sušice, Czech Republic – 2004
- Türi, Estonia – 2004
- Zvolen, Slovakia – 2007
- Rokiškis, Lithuania – 2018
- Marsaskala, Malta – 2009
- Siret, Romania – 2010
- Agros, Cyprus – 2011
- Škofja Loka, Slovenia – 2011
- Tryavna, Bulgaria – 2011

== Daily life in Granville ==
=== Culture ===
The commune has much cultural infrastructure, including three museums: The Christian Dior Museum and its garden, located in the childhood home of the fashion designer, which allows one to discover the artistic and cultural context of the time of Christian Dior on the history of fashion, the Museum of the Old Granville, located in the home of the King who provides an overview of the history of the city, and the Richard Anacréon Modern Art Museum. It also hosts an aquarium located on the Pointe du Roc which shows many species of warm-water marine fish and three exhibition spaces: The Féerie des Coquillages [Enchantment of the Shells], the Palais Minéral [Mineral Palace] and the Jardin des Papillons [Butterfly Garden].

For cultural recreation, the Charles de la Morandière media library, in the town centre, the Room of the Archipelago, a multipurpose room of 600 seats and a 400-seat open-air theatre has been open since 2006, the small Theatre of the Peninsula with a capacity of 65 seats, the newly renovated Le Select cinema offers three rooms, a music school and a digital public space animate the life of the commune.

Sixty-four associations relay and encourage communal cultural life.

=== Sport ===
Granville is equipped with numerous sporting facilities allowing the practice of numerous activities, the Cité des sports equipped with two football pitches, two rugby pitches, two basketball courts, an asphalt athletics track, a boulodrome, a skatepark, a BMX track, four judo and gymnastics halls, the Louis-Dior Stadium, equipped with a football field of honour of two other fields and a cinder athletics track, the André Malraux and Pierre de Coubertin indoor gyms, a covered swimming pool, ten clay and GreenSet covered tennis courts, a sea rowing club, the Regional Sailing Centre, a 27-hole golf course built in 1912 on the seafront, the equestrian club and the racecourse of trot and gallop, with flat and obstacles, opened in 1890 and located in the communes of Bréville-sur-Mer and Donville-les-Bains, clay pigeon shooting, the regional parachuting school and two independent schools, the flying club and ultralight flying school.

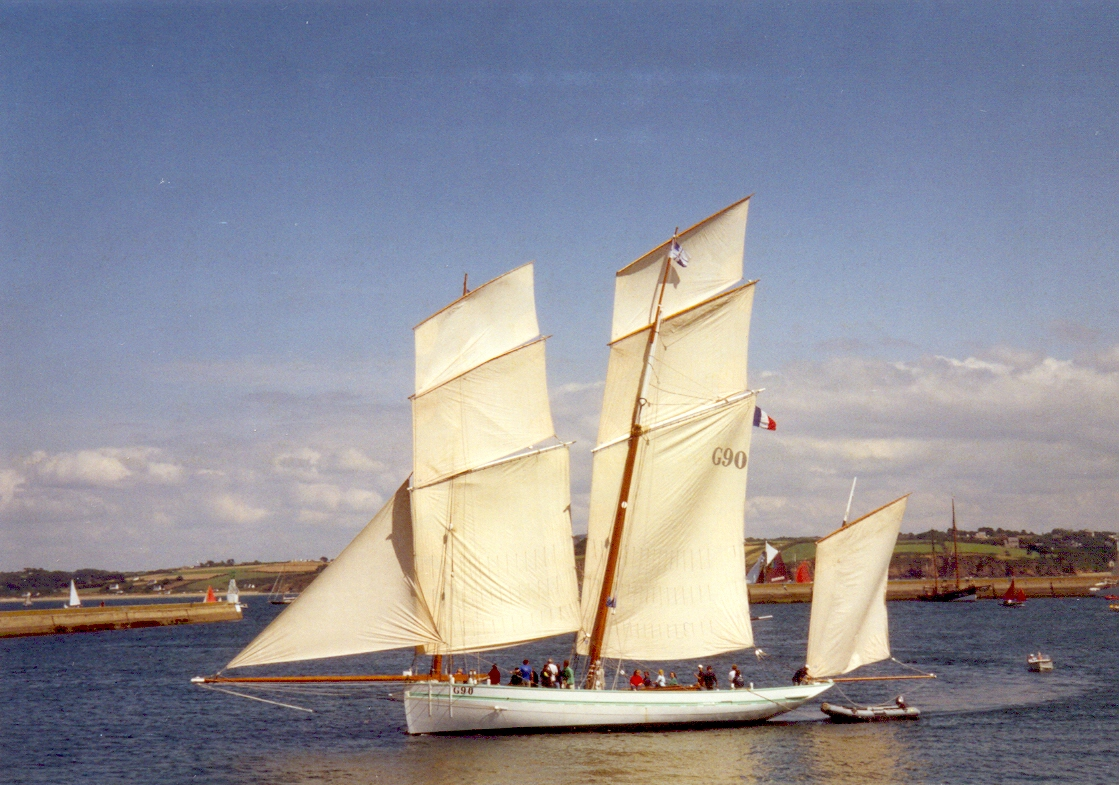
The bisquine La Granvillaise

A municipal sports school and a municipal swimming school provide training for members. Sixty-two associations ensure the relay of communal services.

In road cycling, Granville was a stage town of the 1957 Tour de France, and the Tour de la Manche ends each year at Granville. The commune hosted the start of the third stage of the 2016 Tour de France.

In sailing, Granville is a stage town each year of the Tour de France à la voile. In August are organized: A swimming tour of the Roc, the Chausey regatta, the Course des Bisquines where La Granvillaise and La Cancalaise confront each other, the raid of catamaran in the Bay of Mont Saint-Michel.

The Union Sportive Granvillaise has developed two football teams in the League of Lower Normandy and a third team in the district division.

Granville has also developed its first men's handball team in National 3.

Sports facilities of Granville

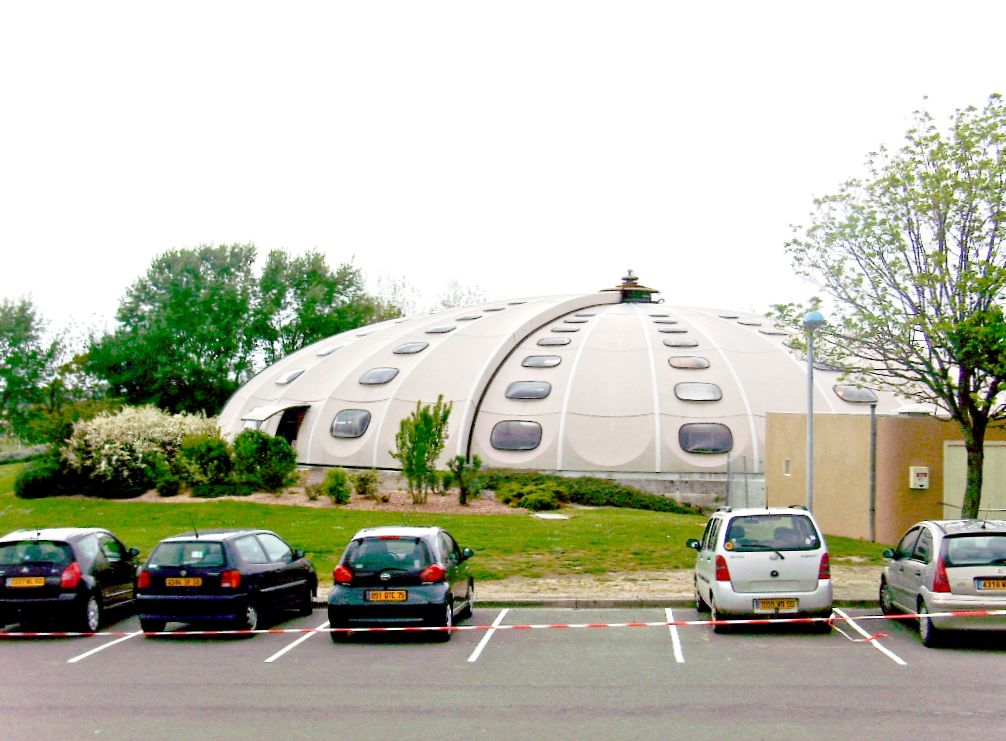
The municipal swimming pool

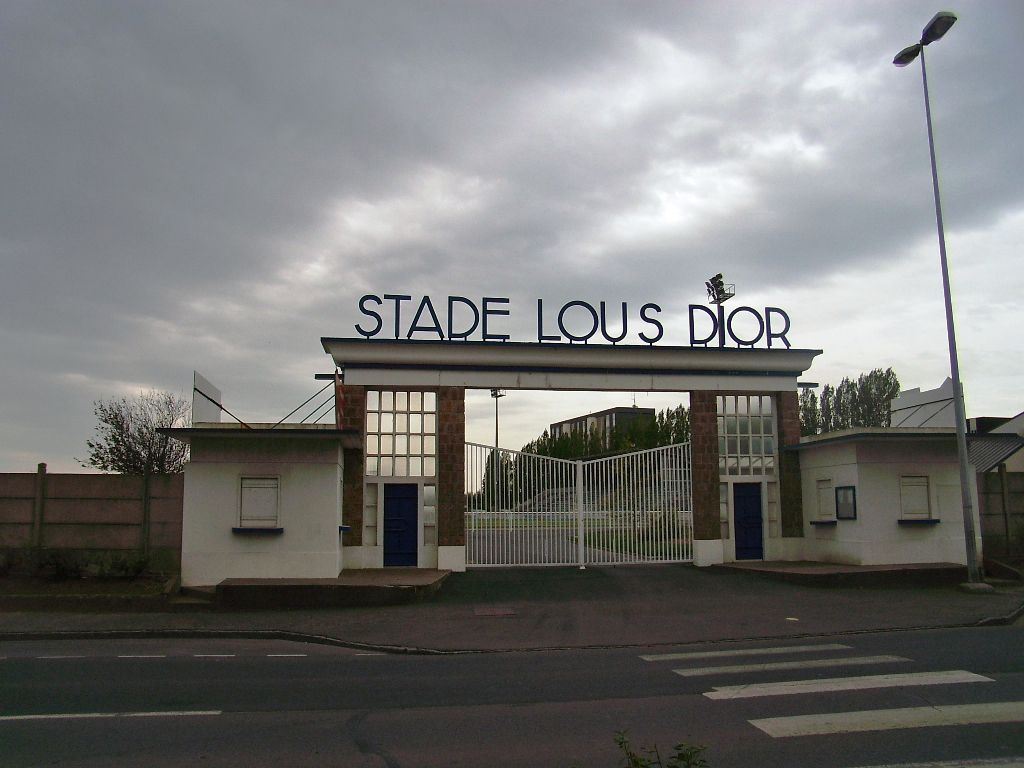
Entrance of the Louis-Dior Stadium

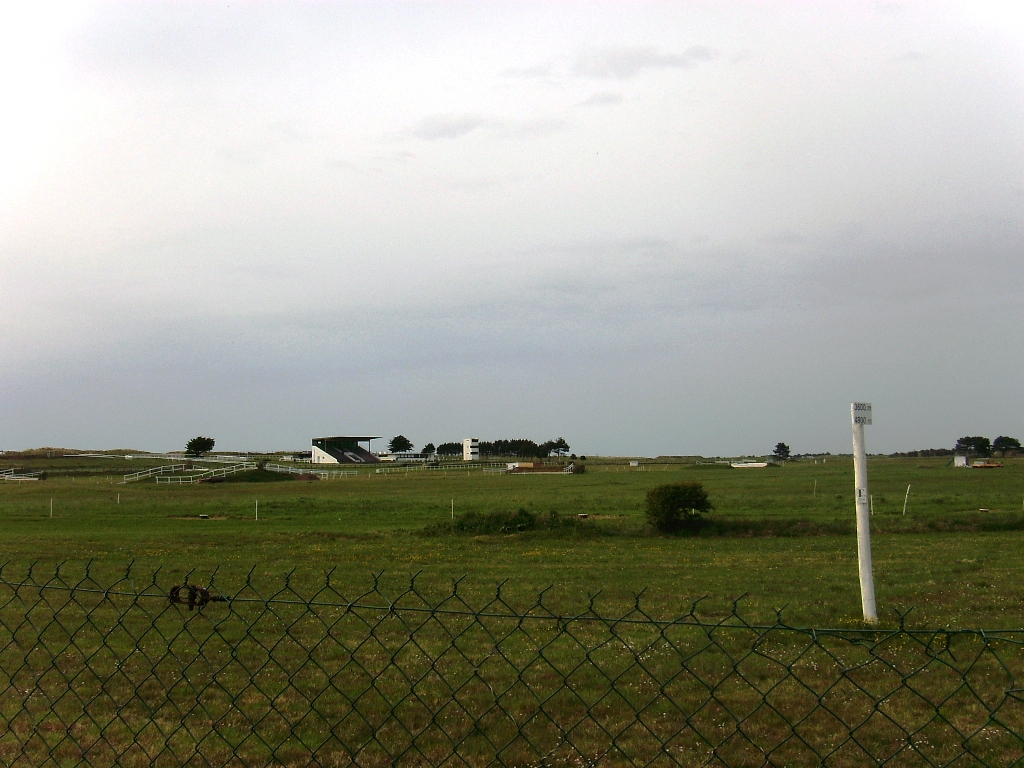
A general view of the racecourse

=== Religion ===
The Catholic churches of Granville are Notre-Dame-du-Cap-Lihou, Saint Paul and Saint Nicolas. They depend on the parish of St. Clement of the Deanery of the Lands of Granville-Villedieu in the Diocese of Coutances and Avranches. The bishop of this diocese is Stanislas Lalanne.

Granville has hosted several congregations, which those of the Sacred Heart and Mercy. Also, between 1839 and 2008, the Sisters Hospitaller of Saint-Thomas-de-Villeneuve were responsible for the hospice of Granville and for the St. Nicolas Care Centre from 1976. The upper town still houses Carmelites.

A Protestant temple of the Reformed Church of France and another of the Evangelical Church welcome the faithful.

Churches of Granville

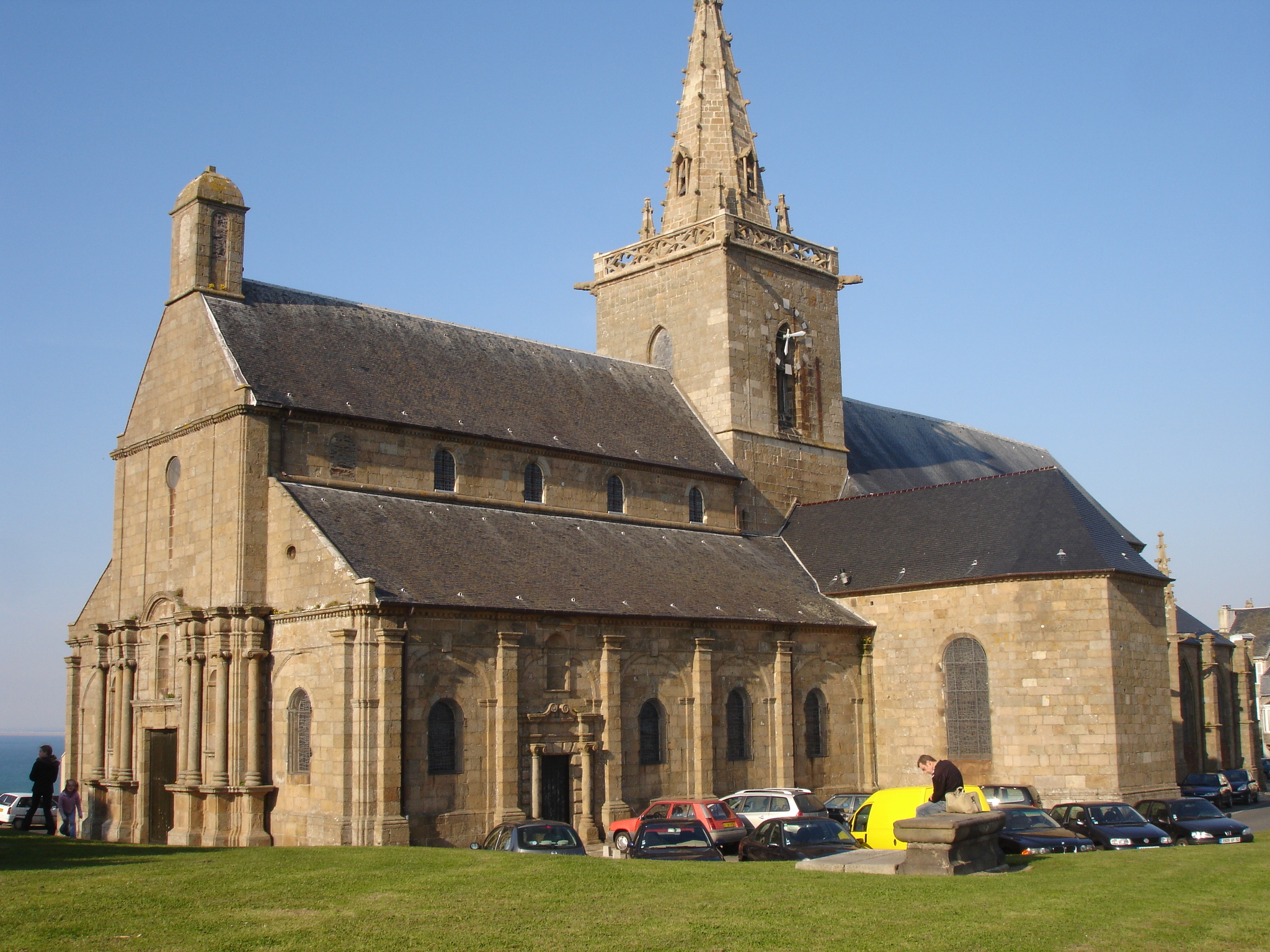
The church of Notre-Dame-du-Cap-Lihou

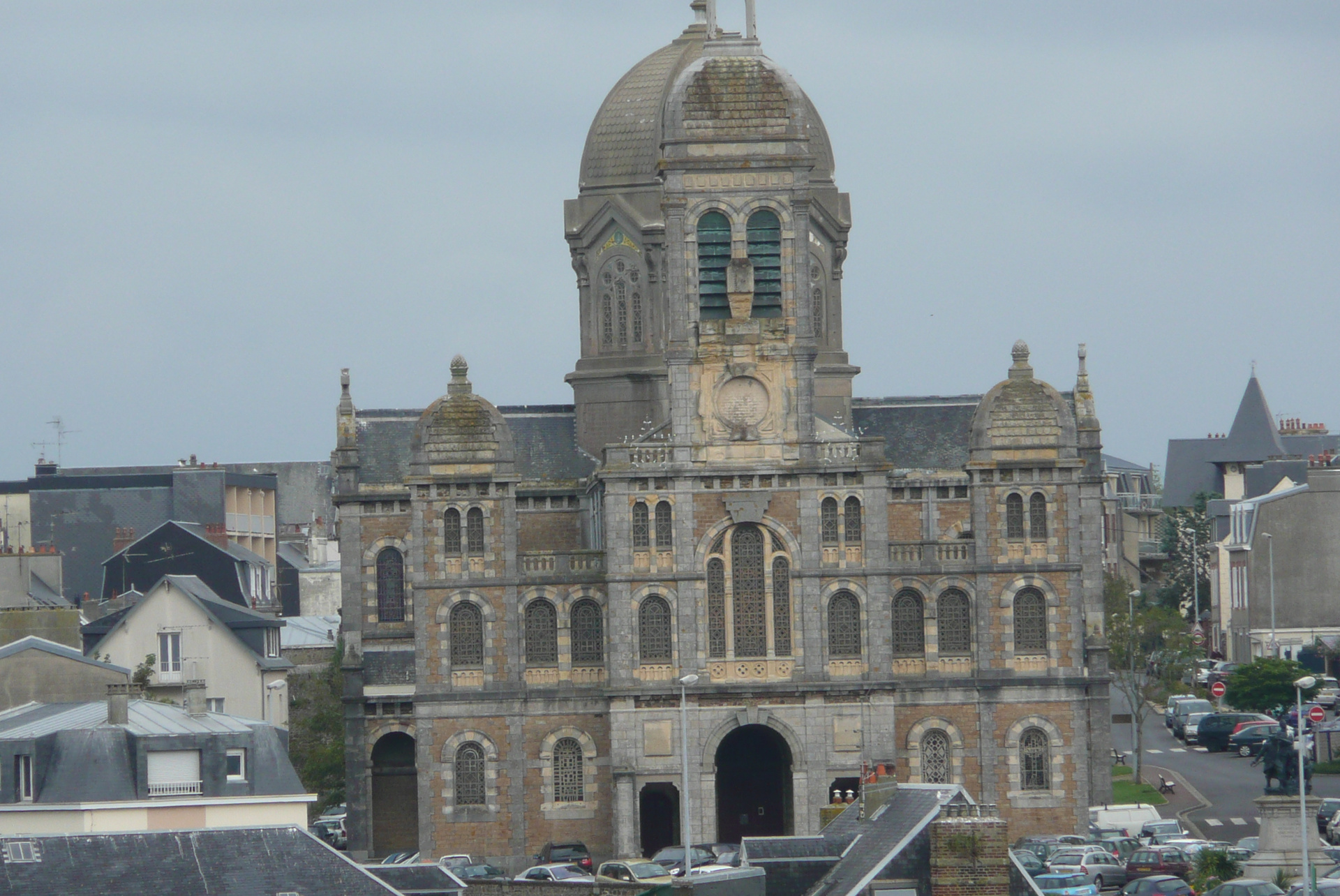
The church of Saint-Paul seen from the upper town

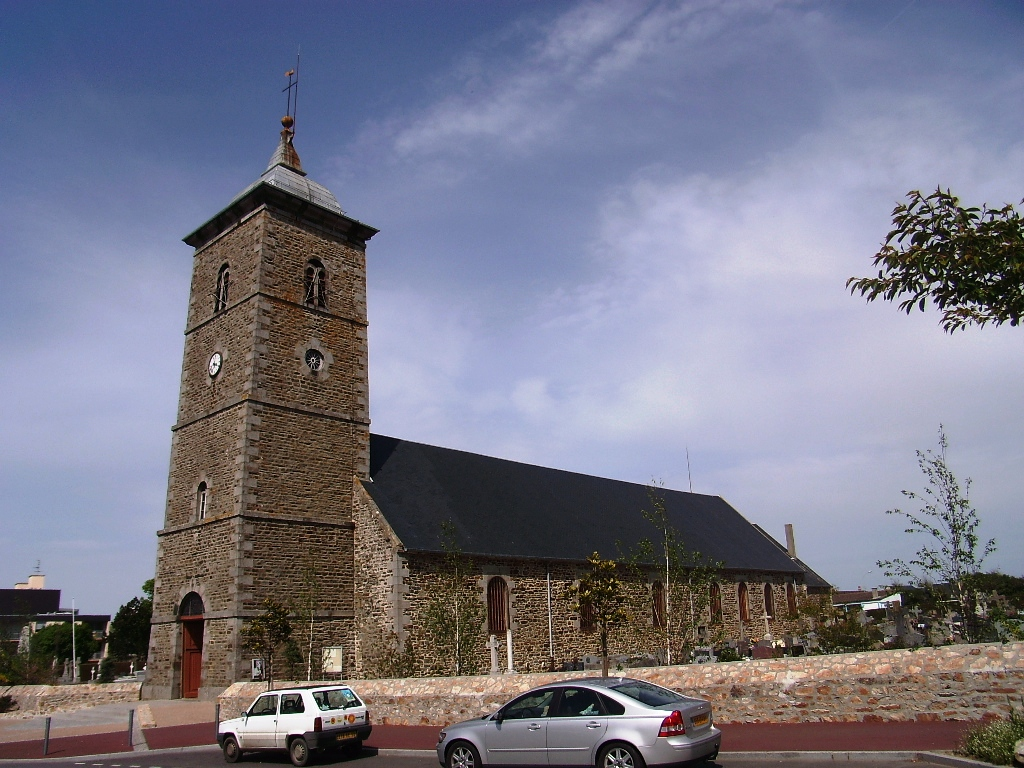
The church of Saint-Nicolas

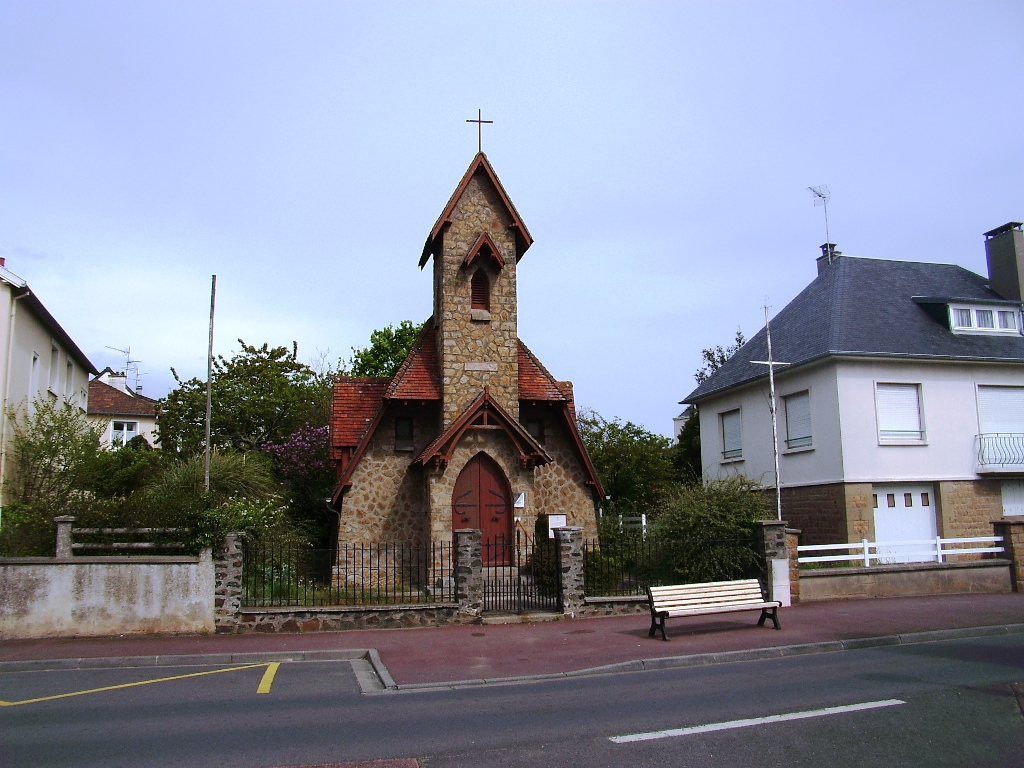
The Protestant temple

=== Media ===
The weekly La Manche Libre and the newspaper Ouest-France have premises in the commune and distribute a specific local edition in the Granville area. Granville is located in the transmission area of the television channel France 3 Normandie. A local correspondent of the Gazette de l'Avranchin and of the Mortainais officiates in the commune.

== Economy ==
Granville is the seat of the Chamber of Commerce and Industry of Central and South Manche. It manages the port and airport (IATA: GFR, ICAO: LFRF) of the commune. It is the main centre of the labour area of Granville, covering 45 communes. and an important tourist resort of the Bay of Mont Saint-Michel. Accessible via Granville railway station and situated 25 km (16 mi) from the Route des Estuaires, it is an important economic hub in the south of the department of Manche. It has set up a business incubator and has three areas of activity or industrial areas: Le Mesnil, La Parfonterie and Le Prétôt. The largest employers in the commune are the centre of thalassotherapy Le Normandy, the Compagnie Générale des Eaux and the biscotte factory of LU-Heudebert opened in 1973. In 2017, the unemployment rate was 11.5% for a rated active population of 4,514 people. 44.5% of the main residences were inhabited by their owners (2017), and the commune hosts 1,617 companies (2015). Granville was a garrison town with the presence of a contingent of the 1st RIMa until 1984. A market is held every Saturday on the Cours Jonville.

Distribution of employment by socioprofessionnal category in 2006.
	Farmers	Artisans, merchants, CEOs	Managers and higher professionals	Intermediate professions	Employees	Manual workers
Granville	0.3%	7.1%	10.6%	24.0%	32.5%	24.0%
Distribution of employment by business sector in 2006.
	Agriculture	Industry	Construction	Trade, services	Public services	
Granville	1.8%	8.6%	5.2%	44.4%	40.0%	
Sources: Insee

=== Port of Granville ===
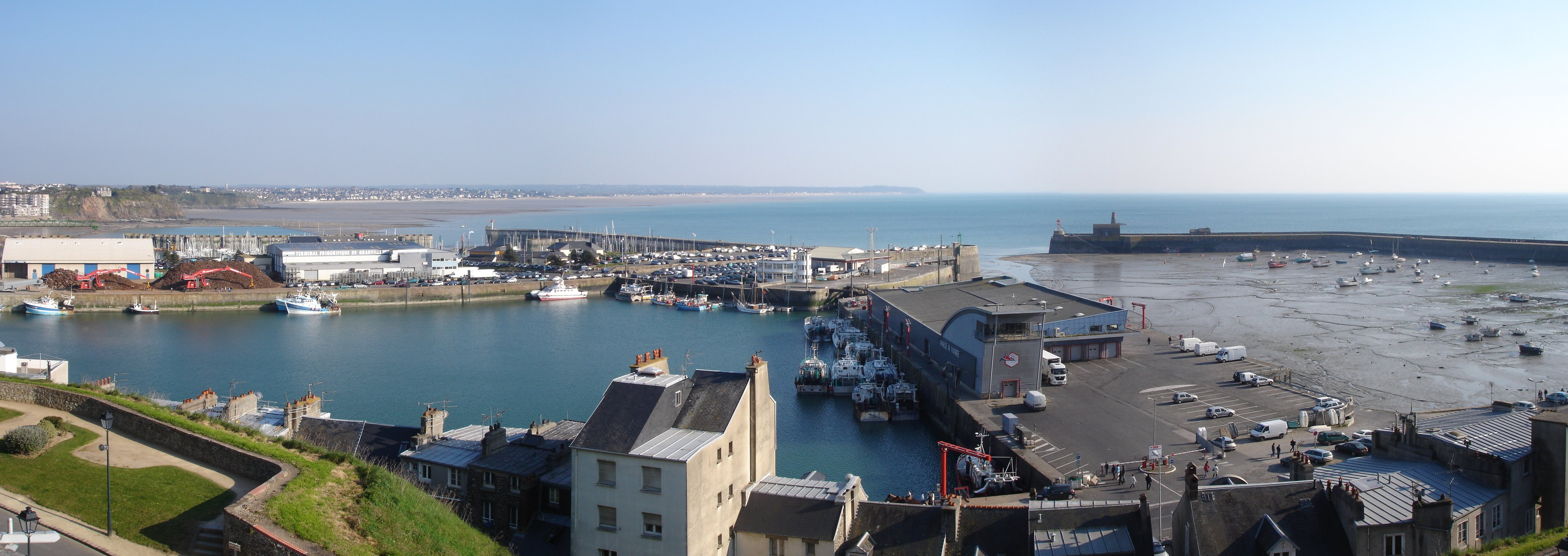
Panorama of the port of Granville from the Haute-Ville. From left to right: In the background, the Hérel Marina, the pier for Chausey, the fishing port hall and the harbour at low tide.

The port of Granville dates back to the 16th century. It is managed by the CCI of Centre and South-Manche and includes boating activities, fishing, commercial and passenger traffic.

This part of the Channel is known for its many rocks off the coast, not always visible above sea level, and for the dangerous flows caused by tides. The bay of Mont Saint-Michel experiences one of the greatest tidal ranges in the world, and this causes strong currents that generate dangerous flows into the international sea routes, adding to the normal tidal flow that goes along the Channel. The area also often experiences fog as well as easterly winds which can create dangerous storms during autumn and winter.

The waters off Granville are regularly affected by pollution caused by modern shipwrecks, or by illegal fuel tank discharges into the sea. There is now an international agreement between France and the UK, as well as other European countries bordering the Channel, to severely punish ship-owners when such pollution can be proven. The area is constantly under surveillance by aircraft and radar operated by civil and military authorities. Granville harbour hosts a small maritime emergency rescue team.

The number of rocks and shipwrecks in the area creates an environment rich in seafood, which can be exploited from the small harbour of Granville. Fishing is dangerous in the area, and many small fishing boats have been involved in collisions with large commercial vessels such as container ships and oil supertankers.

In 2005, Granville was placed at 32nd in the national rank with 197,000 tonnes of handled cargo and 44,100 passengers. It is also a permanent station of the SNSM which has a lifeboat (registered SNS 074) and two RIBs.

A cod fishing and oyster port in the 19th century, it became:

- There are some sea services to England and to the Channel Islands. This traffic is relatively light from Granville, as Saint-Malo and Cherbourg offer more industrialised facilities for passenger and cargo traffic. Manche Iles Express operates a ferry from Granville to St Helier, 33.6 mi (54.1 km) away. A port for the carriage of passengers with the ferries Douce France, Jolie France II and Joly France I destined for the Chausey and Channel Islands. Although there are no regular passenger sea services between Granville and Chausey. French and British security forces operate permanently in this very dangerous and narrow area of the Channel, which is one of the busiest sealanes in the world.
- A trading port with the capacity to accommodate ships of 18 m (59 ft) wide, 125 m (410 ft) long and five to six thousand tons of capacity, primarily for shipments of scrap metal, sand and gravel equipped with two cranes that can lift one hundred to three hundred tons per hour, and with a conveyor belt with a capacity of 750 tons per hour. The maximum permissible draught in Granville harbour is 11.60 with a tidal coefficient of 100.
- The first Norman fishing port of shellfish (clams, whelks, dog cockles, Saint-Jacques scallops), crustaceans (lobsters, brown crabs, small crabs, spider crabs) and fish (bream, rays, sharks, soles, pollock, bass, red mullet, cod, cuttlefish and squid) for local consumption with a fish market, a refrigerating terminal and a computerised sale of products. The tonnage landed (excluding farming) is of the order of 16,000 tonnes per year. An average of seventy-five equipped vessels with nearly 450 professional sailors attend the port. The marine cultures present on the islands of Chausey produce nearly 250 tons of clams, 5,000 tonnes of mussels and 100 tons of oysters.
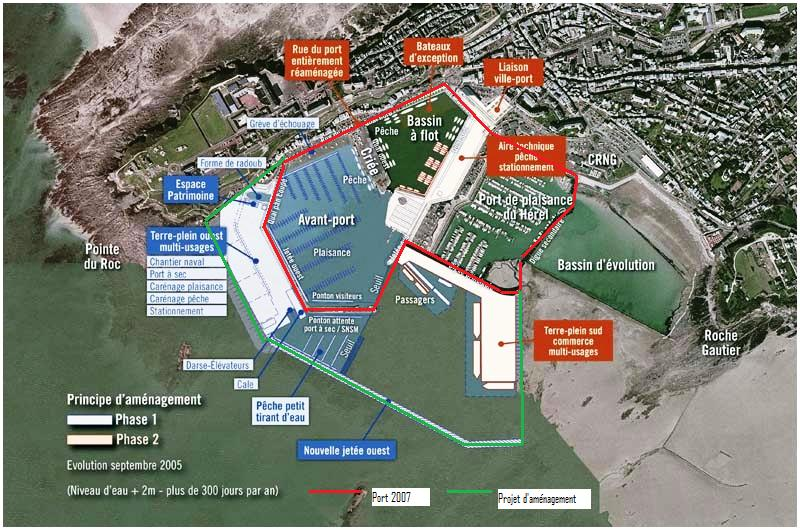
  An aerial view of the development project of the port of Granville
- A marina, since 1975, of a thousand docking rings at the Hérel Basin. It hosts 3,500 vessels per year, with an average of three passengers per boat. They represent €787,000 of direct benefits, in addition to an annual turnover of €25 million for the 40 companies which work from the marina. Located a few minutes walk from the town centre, the Hérel Marina is one of the local economic lungs.

A port redevelopment and expansion project will provide an additional seven hundred places for recreational boating, the excavation of basins and access channels to extend access times and beaching capacity, the addition of a quayside for cruise ships and of exception, a new port city link, with the study of a railway extension project a redevelopment of the road routes, respecting and valuing the environmental and architectural heritage including the piers of the 18th and 19th centuries.

=== Granville-Mont-Saint-Michel Airport ===
The airport of Granville-Mont-Saint-Michel specialises in tourist and leisure aviation.

=== Tourism ===
The commune has been classified as a climate resort since 16 March 1926, and a tourist and seaside resort since 12 March 1979. Tourism is an important part of the local economy. The commune has a tourist office which ensures the promotion of monuments, museums and natural sites, and has joined the association of the Most Beautiful Detours of France. It offers much infrastructure, including some certified by the Quality Tourism label issued by the French Ministry for the Economy and Finance: Two three-star hotels, six two-star hotels and seven hotels not classified with a total of 213 rooms, two three-star campsites with a total of 145 pitches, communal gites on the Chausey Islands and guest rooms, a youth hostel, a thalassotherapy centre, thirty-three restaurants with a total of 1,931 seats.

For entertainment, the city offers an independent casino, four museums, an aquarium, a rich architectural and environmental heritage, four beaches, and four Wi-Fi access points. 17.5% of Granville housing are second homes, with 54.1% of apartments. Several cruises start at the port of Granville, with destinations including Chausey, the Channel Islands, the Isle of Wight, the Isles of Scilly, and Ireland, including by the passenger ferries of Granville, the Lys Noir and La Granvillaise.

This organisation and the promotion of tourism provides an important attendance to the area, with 69,627 passengers to Chausey in 2006, 54,301 visitors for the Christian-Dior Museum, and 43,500 for the Aquarium du Roc in 2005.

Tourist facilities in Granville

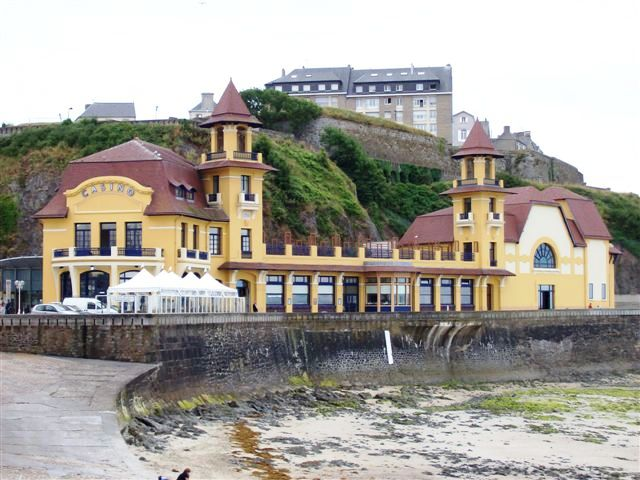
The casino

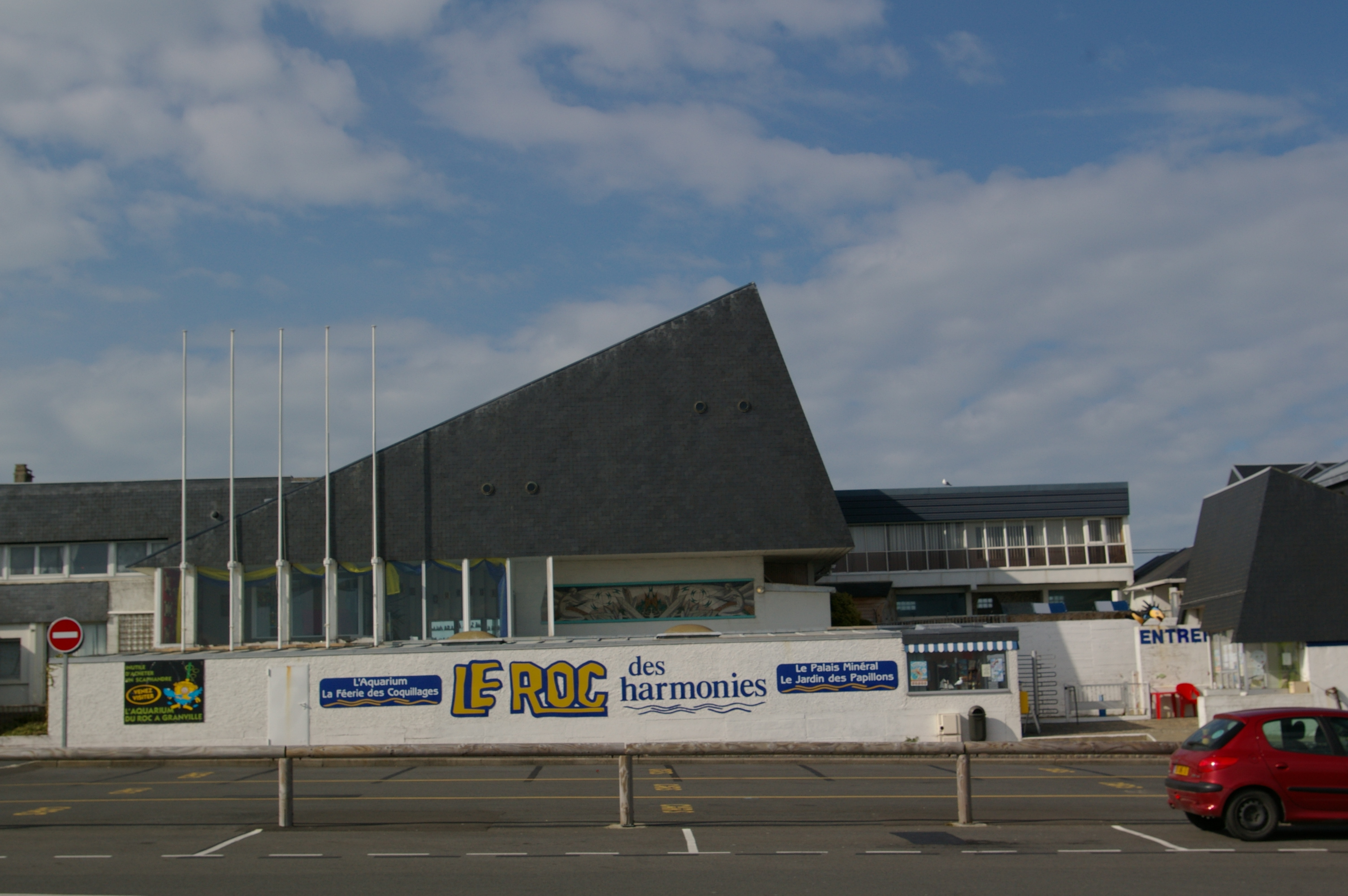
The aquarium "Le Roc des harmonies"

== Local culture and heritage ==
=== Environmental heritage ===
Granville is located near the protected site of the Bay of Mont Saint-Michel, the cliff, the Haute-Ville and the Chausey Islands, are themselves included in the list of sites protected by the DIREN of Normandy. From north to south through the peninsula, the city is crossed by the hiking trail GR 223 which traverses Normandy from Honfleur to Avranches along the coast.

The town was awarded three flowers in the Competition of flowery cities and villages thanks to its parks and gardens: The Christian Dior Garden, the Val-ès-Fleur Park of 3 ha (7.4 acres) complete with a zoo, the squares of Marland, the Arsenal, Chartier, Bisquine, the Charles VII promenades, those of the harbour and of the Plat Gousset. The landscaped golf course, on the territory of Bréville-sur-Mer, was designed by Harry Colt in 1912 and provides 27 holes of links golf.

The Chausey islands were proposed for integration into the Natura 2000 network in 1992, but the Council of the community of communes gave an unfavourable opinion in 2003, blocking the procedure to date. However, the Conservatoire du littoral has acquired the Pointe du Phare.

In addition, the town has on its territory a sewage treatment plant and a waste processing plant for incineration and recycling. It has also set up waste sorting and heads the Joint Association of Granville Coastal Areas for coastal protection against microbiological hazards.

Environmental heritage of Granville

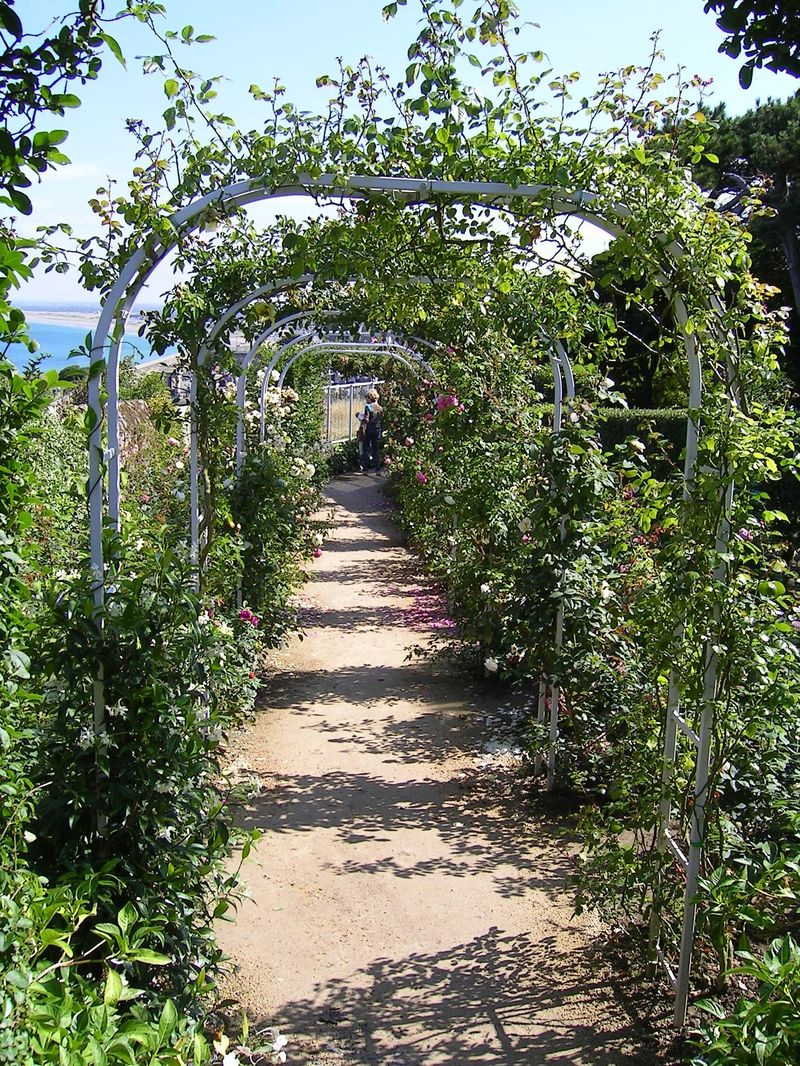
The Christian-Dior Garden

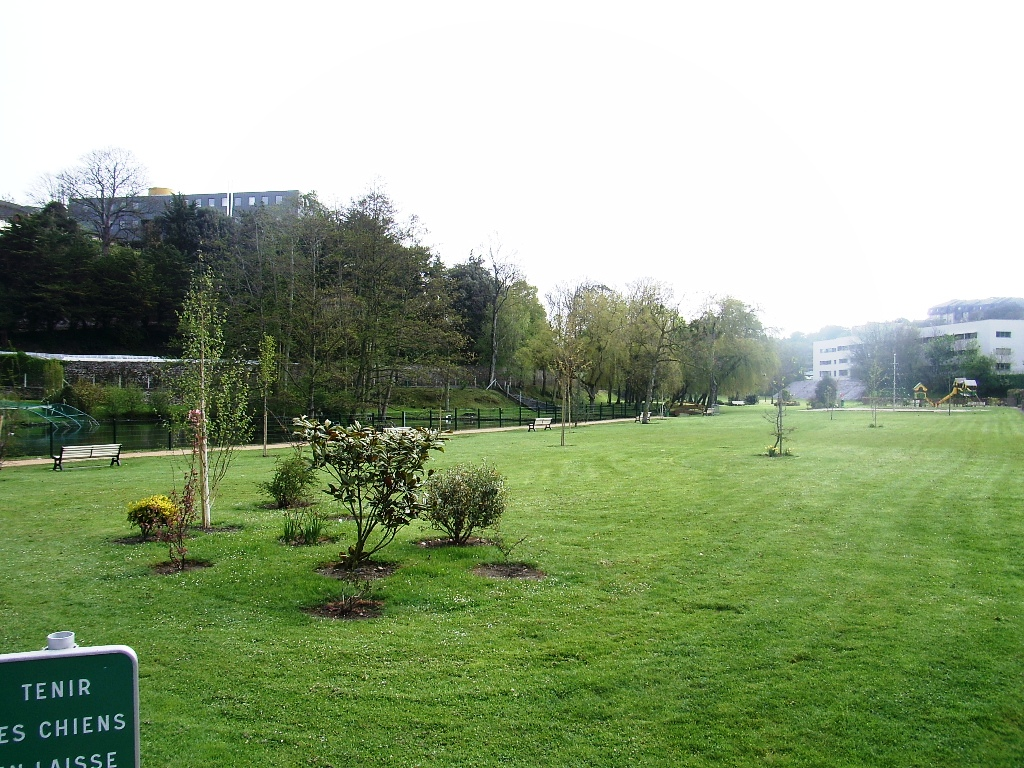
The Val-ès-Fleur Park

=== Architectural heritage ===
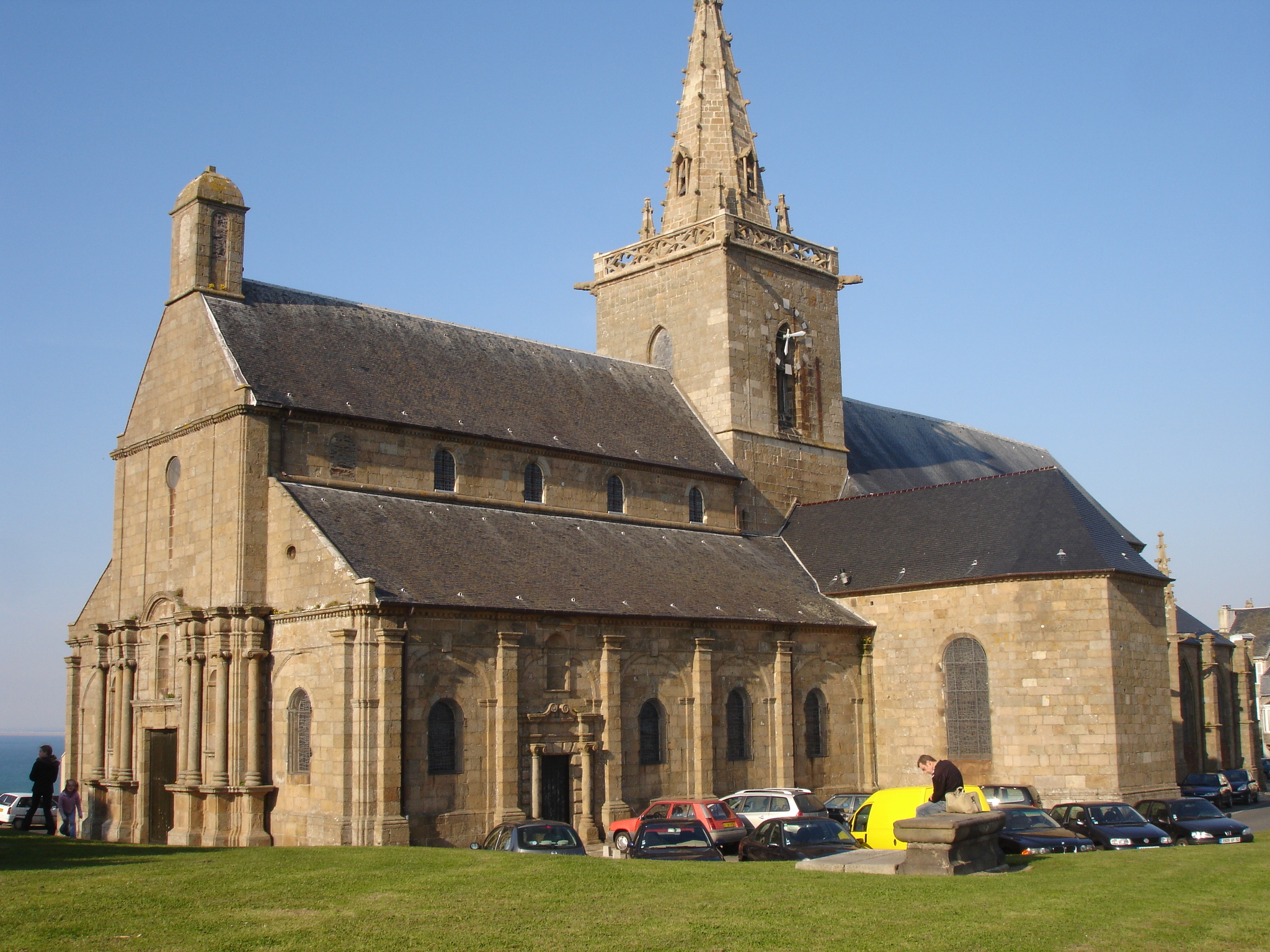
Notre-Dame du Cap Lihou Church

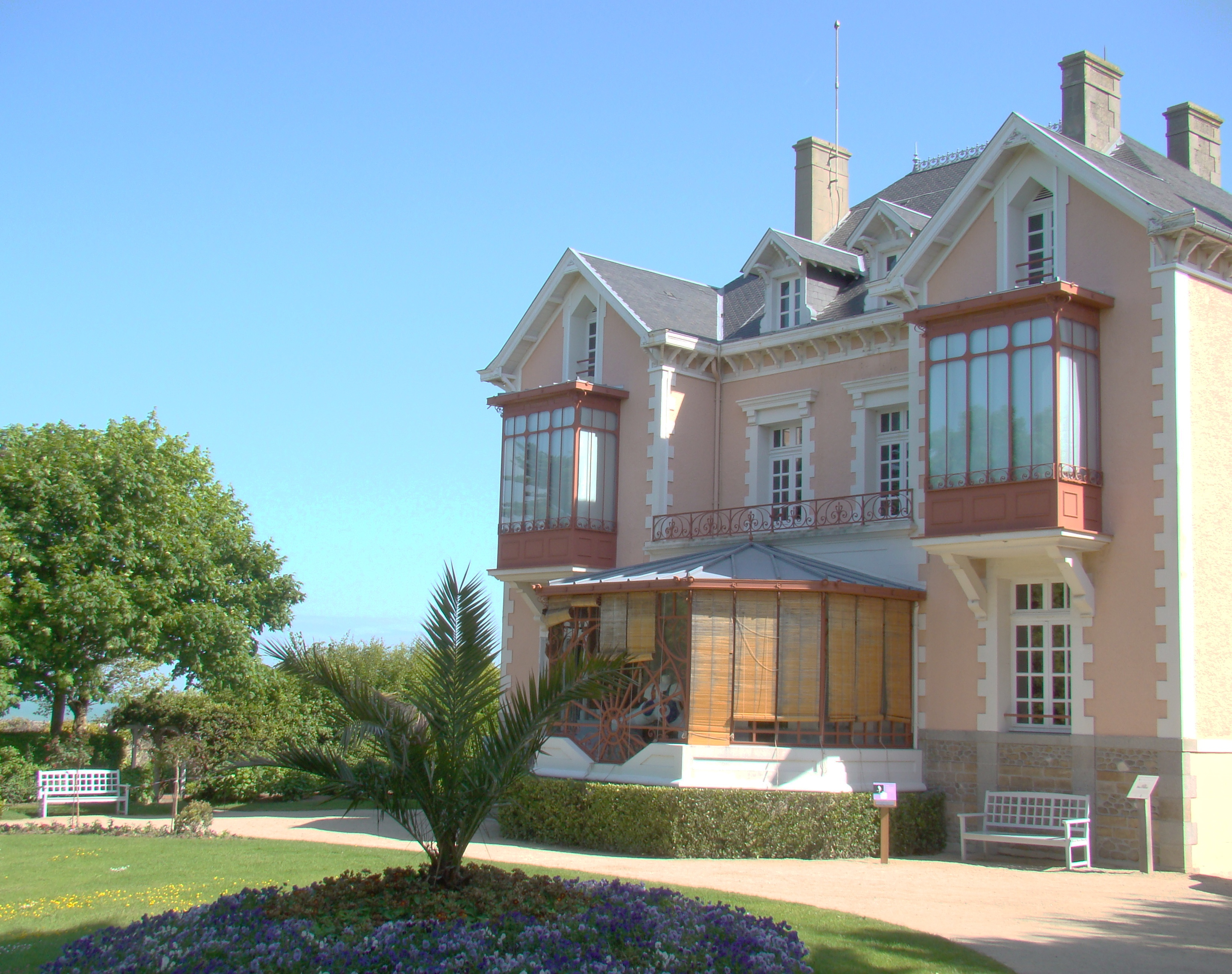
The Christian Dior Museum at the Villa Les Rhumbs

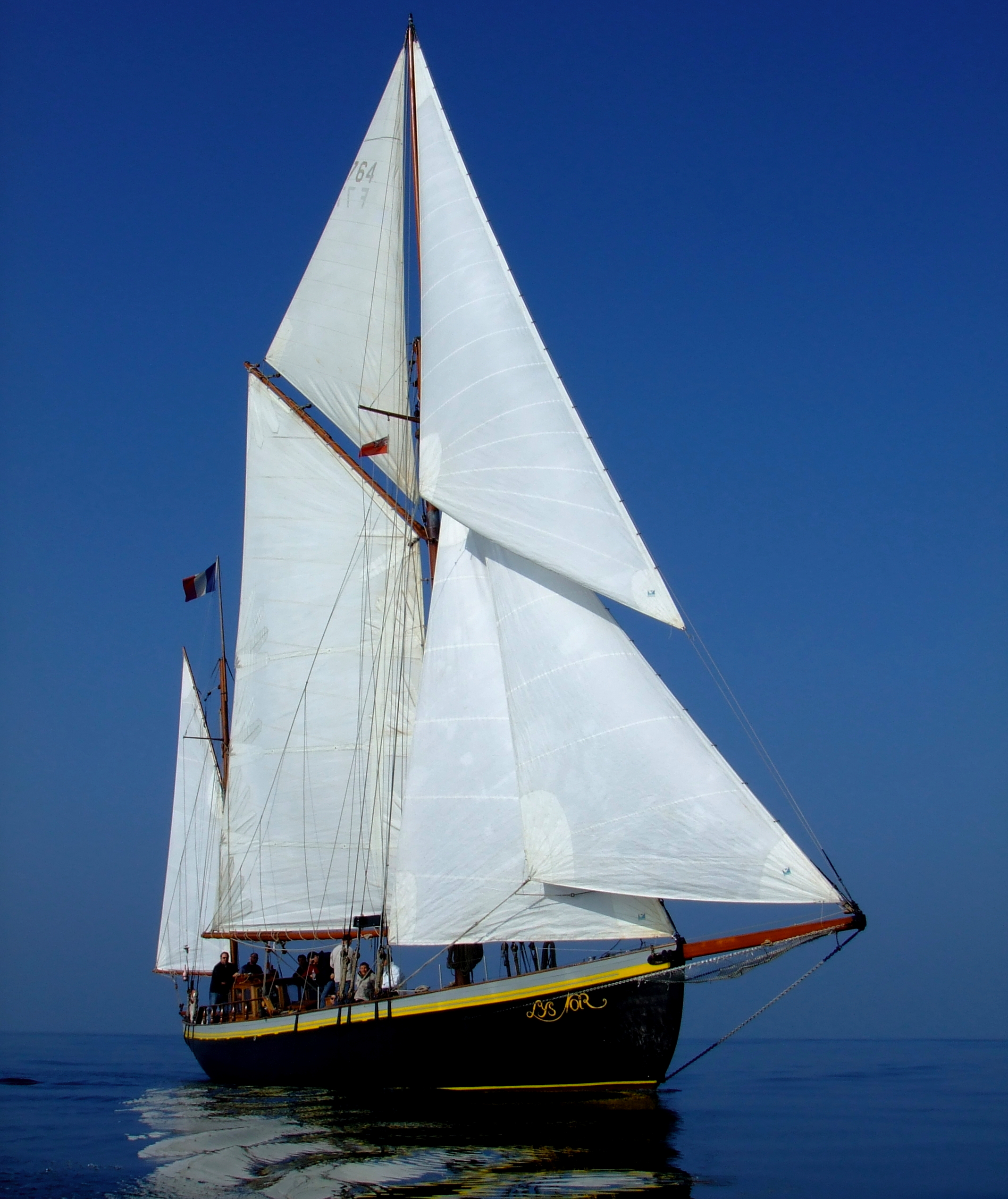
The Lys Noir, French yawl from 1914, is based in Granville

Granville heritage is rich of numerous religious buildings including the Notre-Dame du Cap Lihou Church, The ancient church of Notre-Dame du Cap Lihou (1441–1796) it dominates the heights, constitutes an imposing granite building of the Romanesque / early Gothic style. It was built by the English during the Hundred Years' War. The choir is of 1641, the nave of 1655, the apse chapels in 1676 and 1688, and the sacristy is of 1771, a listed historical monument since 1930, it is decorated with stained glass by Jacques Le Chevallier. As well as a thirteenth-century miraculous statue of Mary, visitors should note, on the eighteenth-century façade, the quatrain:

Si l'amour de Marie
Est en ton cœur gravé
En passant ne t'oublie
De lui dire un Ave.

("If love of Mary is engraved on your heart, when passing do not forget to say Hail to her.") The same verses are to be seen on the façade of Notre-Dame de Bon-Secours in Montréal. There is also St. Paul's Church, the St. Nicholas Church and the Protestant temple.

The lower town was partly built on land reclaimed from the sea. Granville's military past remains, the upper part of the old town is surrounded with the enclosure consisting of the ramparts from the fifteenth century, the drawbridge (Grande'Porte), the bloody theatre of the "Siège des Vendéens" in 1793, built in the 15th century, destroyed and then raised in 1727, and listed as an historical monument since 2004. Inside the walls of the upper town are some beautiful houses of which several are concentrated on Rue Saint-Jean. On the Pointe du Roc overlooking the town, the Bazeilles barracks built in 1758, the Gênes-Champagne barracks built in 1788 and the battery built in 1942 by the German occupiers have been listed monuments since 1987 and 1994.

The Château de Grainville, built in the 15th century, registered as an historic monument since 1980, the Château de la Crête, and Saint-Nicolas' Manor, built in 1786 by the shipowner Nicolas Deslandes, have been registered monuments since 1986 and bear witness to the importance of certain families in the region.

The statue of Pléville le Peley at the port showcases the character of the city.

The casino of Art Nouveau and Art Deco style, built between 1910 and 1925 by architect Auguste Bluysen, has been listed as an historic monument since 1992, the hotel des bains of 1926, the railway station of the 19th century, the lighthouse of Cap Lihou, built in 1828, according to a study of Augustin Fresnel, 18 m (59 ft) high, Chausey Lighthouse, built in 1844, 19 m (62 ft) high, both classified as historical monuments, the Sénéquet Lighthouse on the rock of Sénéquet, 2 nmi (3.7 km) off the coast and 27-hole golf course built in 1912 by Harry Shapland Colt all date from the beginning of the resort nature of the commune.

The covered market was labeled 'Heritage of the 20th century' by the DRAC. The residential tower "Le Charme" [The Charm] located on Rue Jean Rostand dominates the commune with its thirteen floors.

There is a museum located in one of the gates which preserves invaluable documents enabling visitors to discover the history of the town through the centuries.

Granville also is the home of the Christian Dior Museum, which is located in the fashion designer's childhood home, Villa Les Rhumbs.

After a first bid at the beginning of the 1990s, Granville postulated in 2009 to be labelled Town of Art and History. Declared 1 July 2015, in the sub-prefecture of Avranches, the association law 1901 "Granville, country of the foreshore" which comprises the communes of Granville and Saint-Pair-sur-Mer, Jullouville and Carolles, is now the candidacy "Lands of Art and History" label.

Architecture of Granville

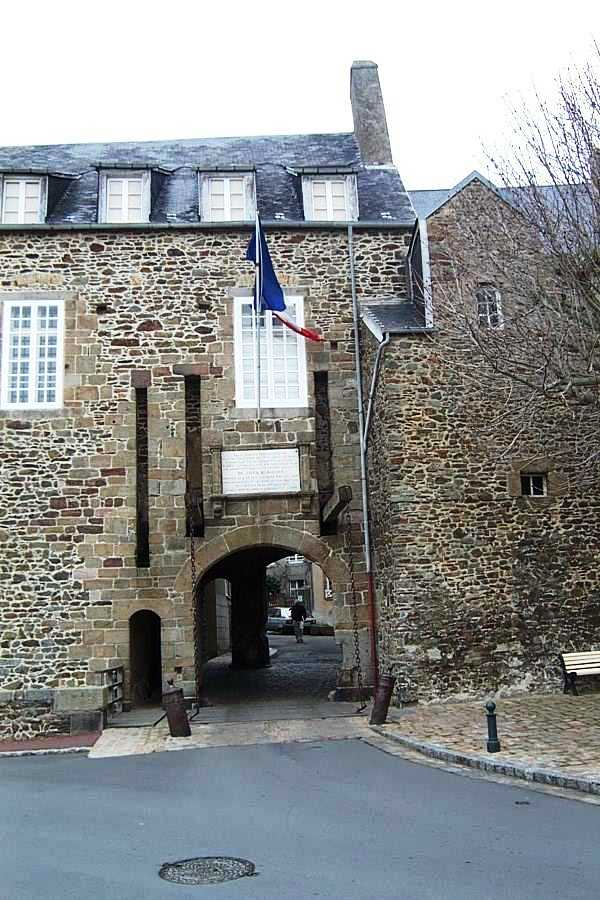
The gatehouse of the Haute-Ville

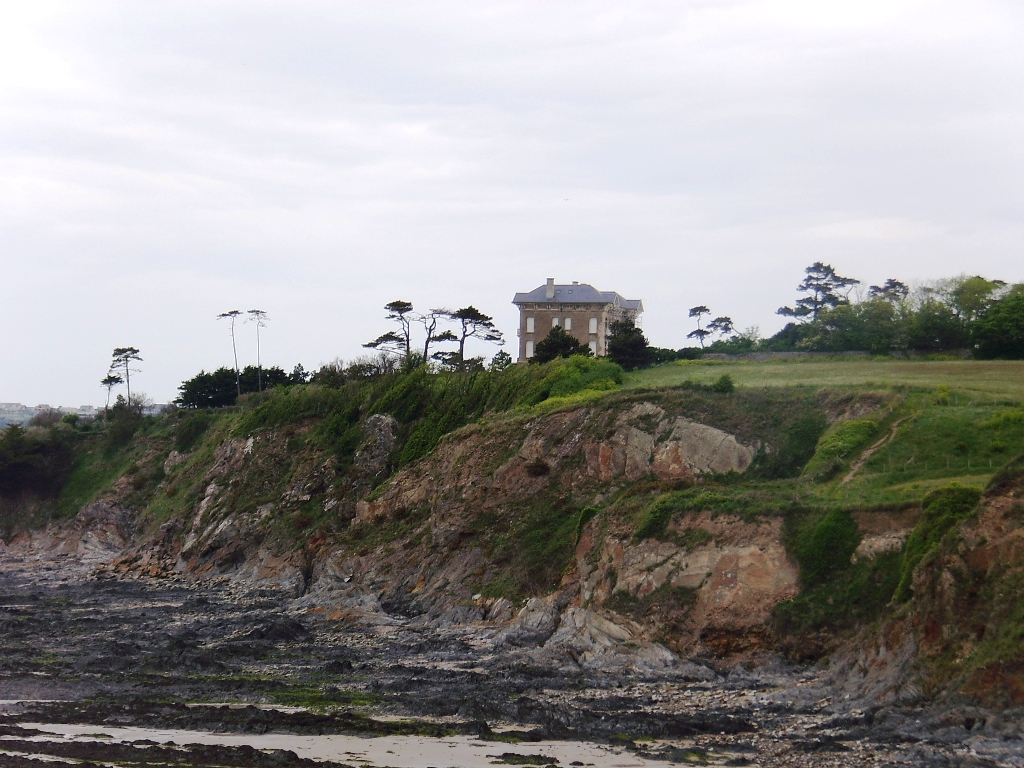
The Château de la Crête

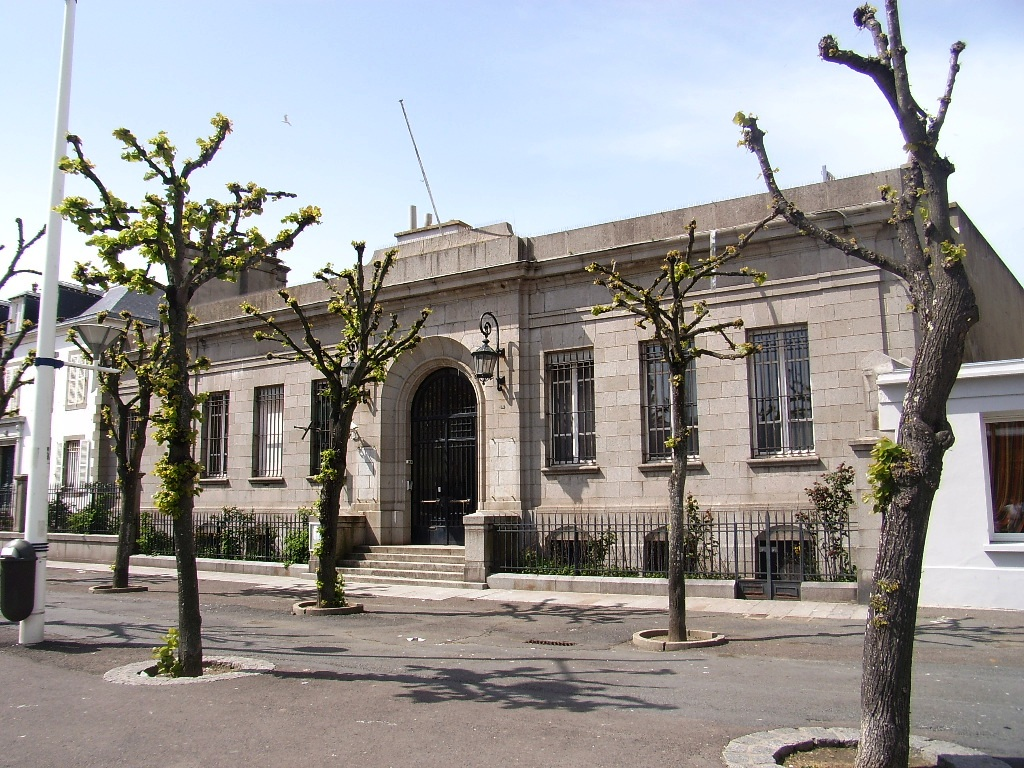
The Bank of France building

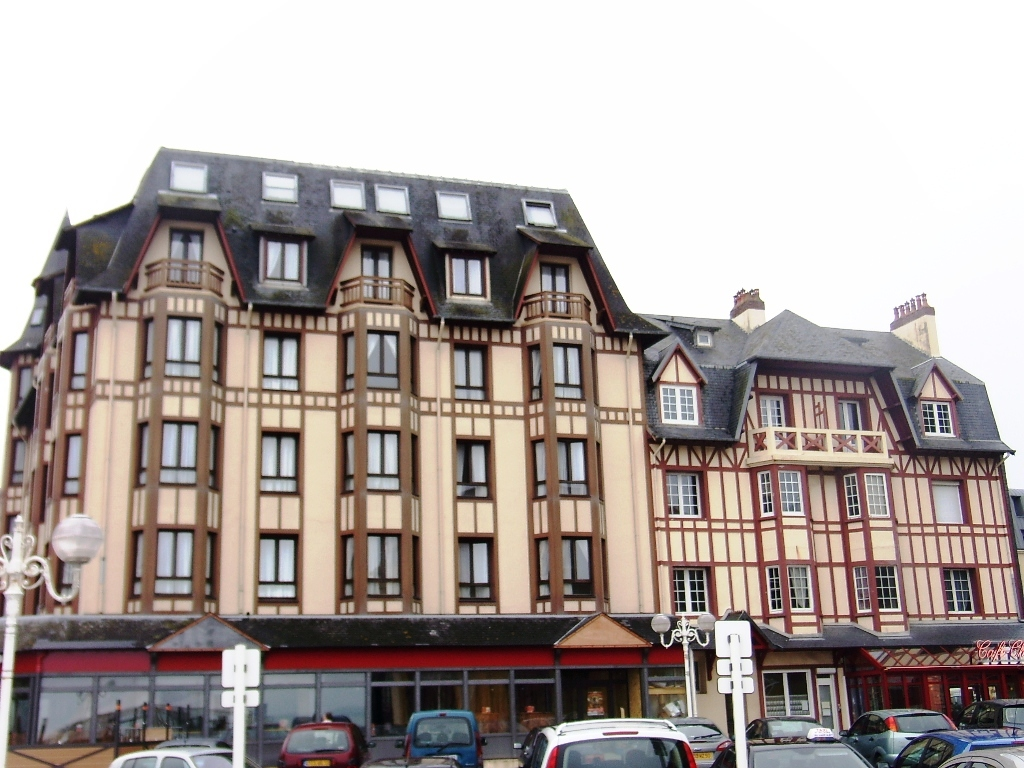
The hôtel des bains

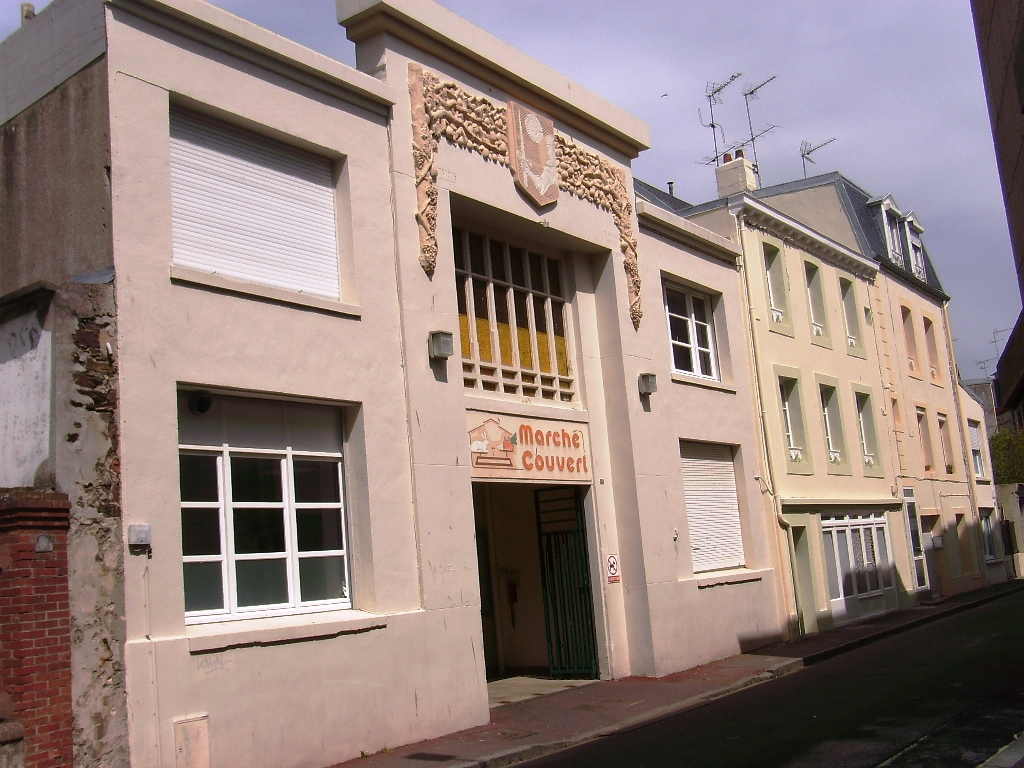
The covered market

=== Festivities ===
The festive year of Granville revolves around various events. The carnival takes place every year during the week before Mardi Gras. It once celebrated the departure of the sailors who took advantage of the holiday before sailing for Newfoundland. In 2007, for its 134th edition, it hosted more than 130,000 spectators. The feast of the patron saint of the commune is organised at Pentecost. Each year, the third week of July is dedicated to the Rue Sorties de Bains festival, of which the fifth edition took place in 2007. Outdoor concerts are held during the tourist season. The procession of the Grand Pardon des Corporations et de la Mer [Atonement of the Corporations and the Sea] is traditionally held the last Sunday of July. The Night of Welders, a festival gathering metalworking artists, takes place during the first weekend of August. The same weekend the Journée du Livre [Day of the Book] is organised, during which writers dedicate their works.

Two fairs are held on the second Saturday in April and the third Saturday of September, a flea market is organised during the weekend of 14 July and an antique fair during the weekend before 15 August. A collectors fair is scheduled for the last Sunday in October. In 2005, the commune celebrated the centenary of the birth of Christian Dior by organising, across the town, exhibitions and retrospectives on the work and life of the couturier. The Christian Dior Museum sometimes serves as a framework for events, as was the case in 2008 for the exhibition entitled "Dandysmes - 1808–2008, of Barbey d'Aurevilly at Christian Dior".

=== Personalities linked to the commune ===
Several public figures were born, died or lived in Granville:

==== Born in Granville ====
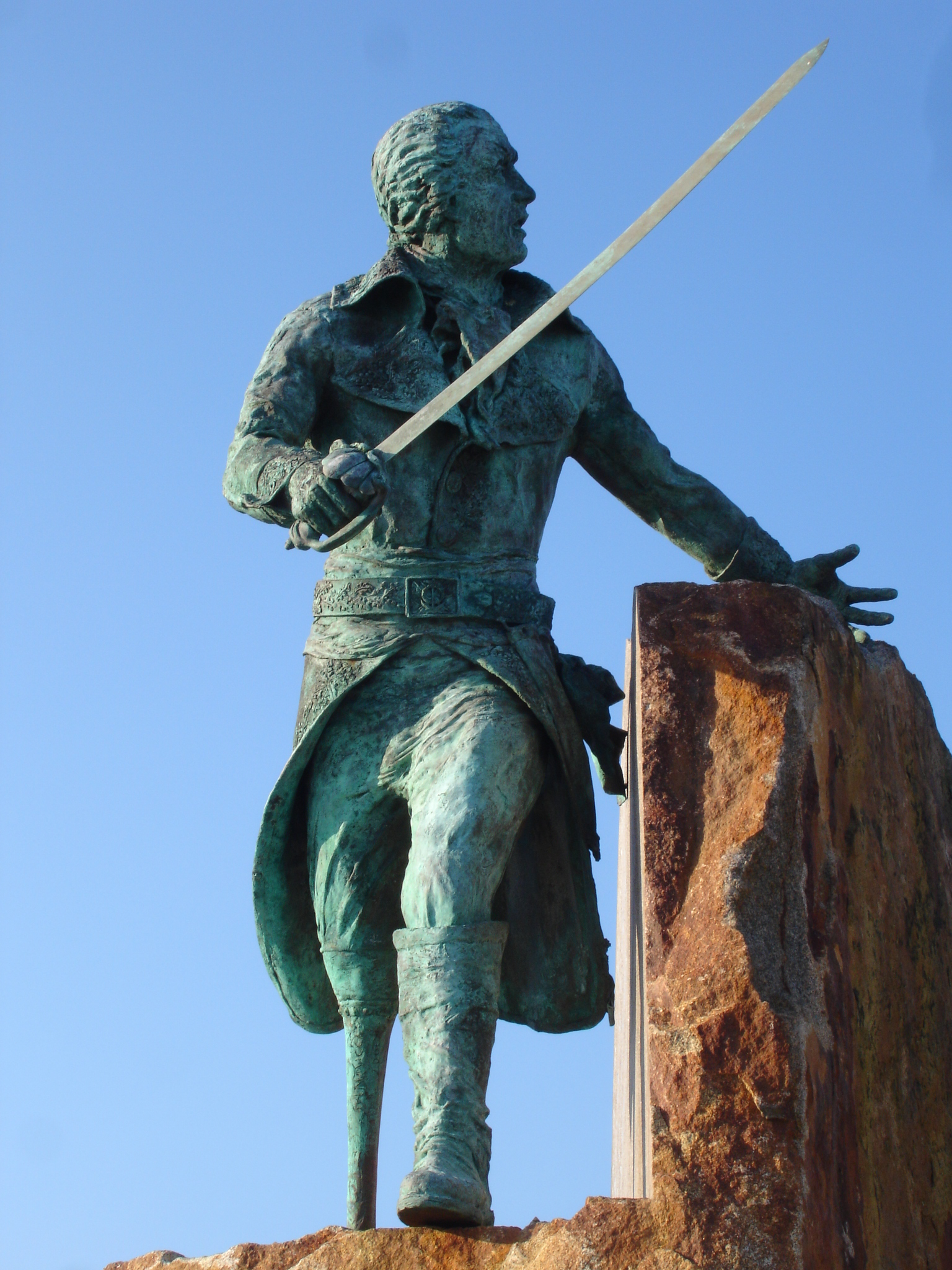
Statue of Georges René Le Peley de Pléville, work in bronze and granite of sculptor Serge Santucci and architect François Pougheol.

- Louis-Georges de Bréquigny (1714–1795), historian and paleographer.
- Georges René Le Peley de Pléville (1726–1805), vice admiral, Minister of Marine and Colonies
- Pierre-Nicolas Perrée-Duhamel (1747–1816), mayor of Granville, member of the Council of Elders and the Tribunate
- Étienne-François Letourneur (1751–1817), Director of the French First Republic
- Jacques Epron-Desjardins (1767–1837), frigate captain during the Revolution and the Empire, he commanded the seventy-four L'Argonaute at the Battle of Trafalgar
- Jacques Epron de la Horie (1768–1841), captain of La Piémontaise, was born and died in Granville
- Pierre Dumanoir le Pelley (1770–1829), vice admiral, he unsuccessfully commanded the vanguard of the line of Franco-Spanish vessels at Trafalgar; politician and Commander of the Legion of Honour
- Jacques Destouches (1780–1858), royal courier
- François Jourdan de La Passardière (1787–1851), winner of the naval battle of Arromanches in 1811
- Eustache-Louis-Jean Quernel (1787–1847), rear admiral
- Michel Pierre Alexis Hébert (1799–1887), lawyer and politician
- Fulgence Girard (1807–1873), novelist, poet, politician, journalist and historian
- Louis Henri de Gueydon (1809–1886), vice admiral, governor of Algeria
- Fortuné du Boisgobey (1821–1891), writer.
- Charles Lhuillier (1824–1898), painter
- Félix Jourdan de la Passardière, (1841–1913), Auxiliary Bishop of Rouen
- Léon Herpin (1841–1880), landscape painter and on porcelain
- Paul Poirier (1853–1907), professor of anatomy at the Faculty of Medicine of Paris
- Émile Guépratte known as "point d'honneur" [point of honour], (1856–1939), admiral, Grand Croix of the Legion of Honour
- Lucien Dior (1867–1932), politician and industrialist
- Maurice Denis (1870–1943), painter, engraver, theorist and historian of French art
- Léon Carré (1878–1942), Orientalist painter, winner of the Abd-el-Tif prize in 1909
- Léon Julliot de La Morandière, (1885–1968), Professor and Dean of the Paris Law Faculty, then at the University Paris II Panthéon-Assas, also director of the Comparative Law Institute in Paris
- Josyane (1901–1999), actress

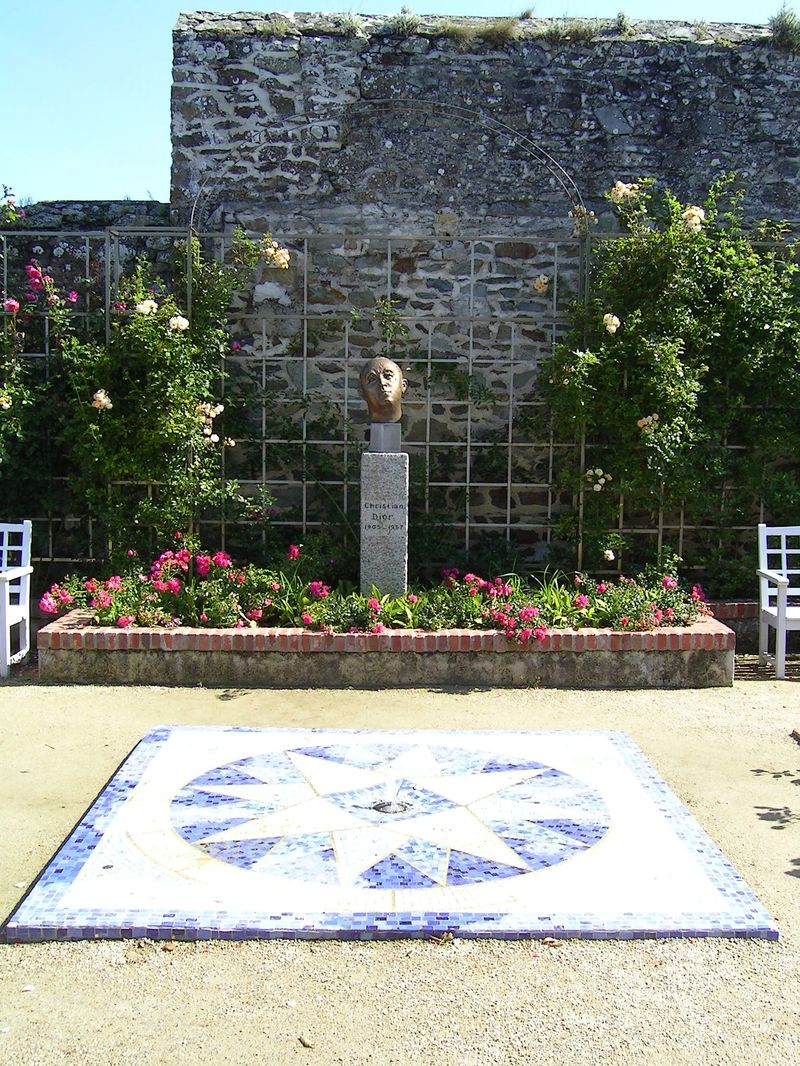
A bust of Christian Dior in the garden of his house

- Christian Dior (1905–1957), legendary couturier
- Denise Cocquerillat (1918–1999), archaeologist and Assyriologist, specialist in cuneiform texts
- Alain Hervé (born 1932), journalist
- Pierre Pican (1935–2018), Bishop of Bayeux and Lisieux
- Georges Fleury (writer) (born 1939), writer
- Gérard Petipas (born 1939), navigator
- Angèle Delaunois (born 1946), writer
- Bernard Chenez (born 1946), cartoonist
- Michel Santier (born 1947), Bishop of Luçon and of Créteil
- Jacky Robert (born 1950), chef
- Philippe Pemezec (born 1955), politician
- Jacques Gamblin (born 1957), actor
- Christophe Auguin (born 1959), sailor, winner of the 1996–97 Vendée Globe yacht race

==== Died in Granville ====
- Eustache Bérat (1791–1870), artist and songwriter
- Edmond-Marie Poullain (1878–1951), painter, died and is buried in Granville
- Jean Tissier (1896–1973), actor
- Eric Crozier (1914–1994), librettist and theatrical director
- Guy Degrenne (1925–2006), businessman

==== Others ====
- Georges Bonheur, investor who was significant to the development of Granville as a seaside resort at the beginning of the 20th century. About the impact of his life and how it is still relevant in Granville today.
- Richard I de Grenville (died after 1142), Anglo-Norman knight
- Thomas de Scales (c. 1400–1460), Knight of the Garter, founded the citadel
- John Granville (1628–1701), 1st Earl of Bath, soldier of the English Civil War, lived in Granville
- George Granville (1666–1735), 1st Baron Lansdowne, English poet, playwright and politician, lived in Granville
- Robert Carteret, 3rd Earl Granville (1721–1776), 3rd Earl Granville, lived in Granville
- Louis Jacob (1768–1854), politician and admiral, lived in Granville
- Honoré de Balzac (1799–1850), writer, stayed there in 1829. He evoked the headquarters in Granville in Le Réquisitionnaire in 1831
- Émile Riotteau (1837–1927), shipowner, politician, mayor of Granville from 1882 to 1888, lived in Granville
- Eugène Le Mouël (1859–1934), writer and poet, lived in Granville
- Maurice Orange (1867–1916), painter, lived in Granville
- Fernand Fleuret (1883–1945), poet, stayed in Granville during his youth
- Maurice Marland (1888–1944), chief of the Resistance of Granville during World War II, a professor in the same town
- Marin-Marie (1901–1987), writer and painter, lived at Chausey
- Bernard Beck (1914–2009), first president of the Court of Auditors in 1978–1982, was mayor
- Bertrand Poirot-Delpech (1929–2006), journalist, writer and academician, lived at Chausey

Stendhal, Jules Michelet, Victor Hugo, Adolphe Willette and Gustave Goublier also all stayed in Granville.

=== Heraldry ===
Arms of Granville	Azure, an armed dextrochere issuant from a cloud issuant from sinister Or, maintaining a sword argent garnished Or, and in chief a sun Or. They represent Joshua arresting the sun (Old Testament, Book of Joshua, Chapter 10, verses 12-13). N.B.: a dextrochere is a right arm (literally right hand).

The coat of arms of Granville has changed several times during its history. The first, granted by Charles VIII in 1487 was thus:

- Azure a dextrochère Or, issuant from a cloud of the same, which holds a sword argent mounted Or and placed between three stars of the same.

The sword symbolising the patriotism of the city during the English occupation, the stars appearing on the night of 8 November 1442 when Louis d'Estouteville took over the city.

The second coat of arms was established in 1697:

- Azure with dextrochère armed Or issuant from a cloud of the same and holding a sword argent, the guard and handle Or, surmounted by a Sun of the same.

The Sun replaced the stars, this new coat of arms symbolised the importance of Granville in the monitoring of the coast of the Bay.

In 1793, the influence of the Revolution changed the azure to gules, but the arm is no longer armed and the sword became an honorary, which gives:

- Gules an arm stretched argent emerging from a cloud azure, holding a sword argent of a guard Or in pale.

In 1811, the First Empire offered new arms to the town, Napoleon adding distinctive towns of second-order signs, a quarter charged with a capital N and a gold star and the exterior ornament of a mural crown:

- Azure on a cloudy fess argent, together with three stars Or, two in chief and one in point, dextrochère armed, sable, moving from sinister side of the shield and holding a sword high Or, quarter and trappings of the towns of second order.

Finally, in 1816 under the Restoration, the town returned to its coat of arms from 1697, unable to pay the registration fee to return to the original coat of arms. This coat of arms is now of the commune, the azure and Sun symbolising its seaside character, the sword recalling its military past of garrison town.

The Granville arms appear on the locomotives nos. X4791 and 8719C of the SNCF under the sponsorship of the commune.

The commune also has a logo.

The commune also has a flag representing a quarterly of blue and white, with a white cross encircled in blue and charged with a representation of the coat of arms in the centre. It is notably used on the commune's yawls.

=== Gastronomy ===
Granville is renowned for its marine products, including Granvillaise galette with scallops sprinkled with cream, sea bream in salt crust with virgin sauce (mussels, shrimps, sea snails and whelks), and the Granvillaise sole accompanied with mussels and prawns. A speciality of the island quarter of Chausey is also linked: The green sauce of Chausey. On Saturday, a market is held in the town centre to purchase local produce. Finally, the Maurice Marland de Granville Hotel School guarantees the dissemination of knowledge of Norman cuisine.

=== Granville dialect ===
Beyond the Norman dialect, there a dialect of the Granville area with its expressions. An example expression is "achitrer" which means "to land a punch".

=== Granville in the arts and culture ===
Granville is the subject of several paintings including Bateaux à Granville [Boats at Granville] painted in 1889 by Maurice Denis, Les brisants à la pointe de Granville [The breakers at the tip of Granville] painted around 1852 by Paul Huet and kept in the Louvre, Plage de Granville [Beach of Granville] painted in 1863 by Eugène Isabey.

=== Myths and legends ===
- The Chausey Islands are part of the ancient Forest of Scissy, a former place of pagan worship, which covered the bay and which reportedly disappeared in 709AD under the waves.
- According to a popular belief, the Chausey Islands consist of 52 islands at high tide and 365 at low tide, as the number of weeks and days in a year, respectively.

== Gallery ==
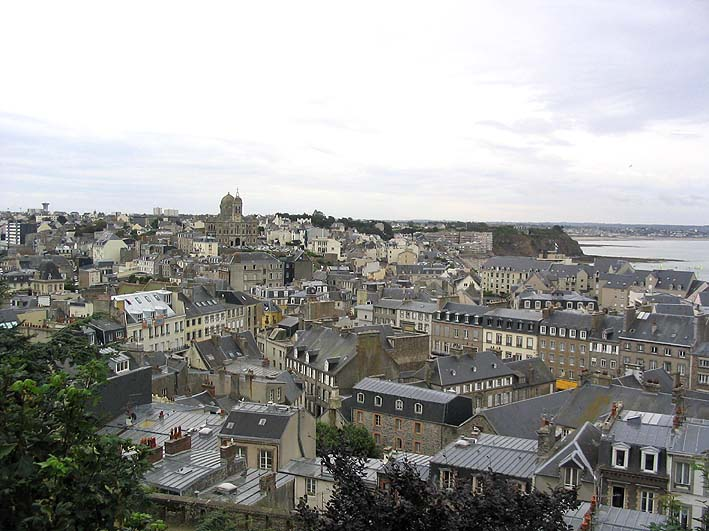
A general view of Granville from the ramparts

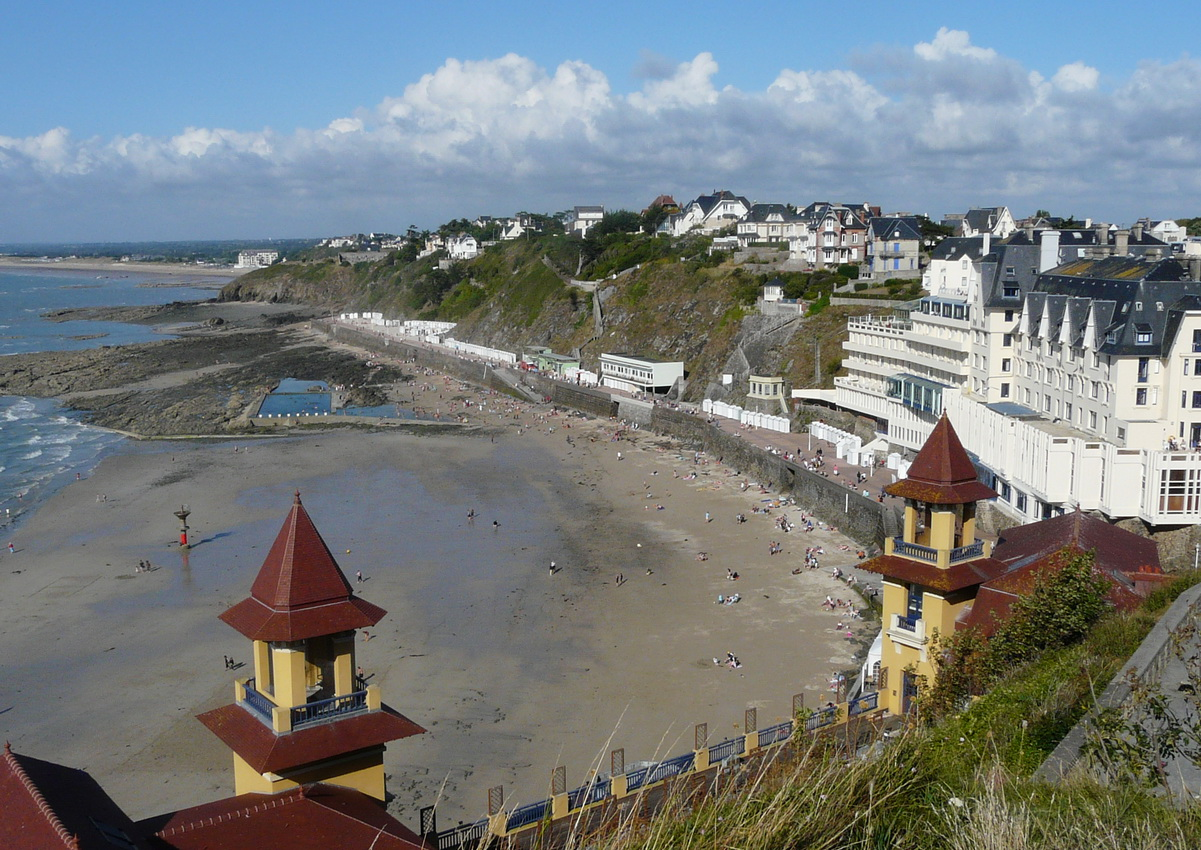
The Plat-Gousset beach

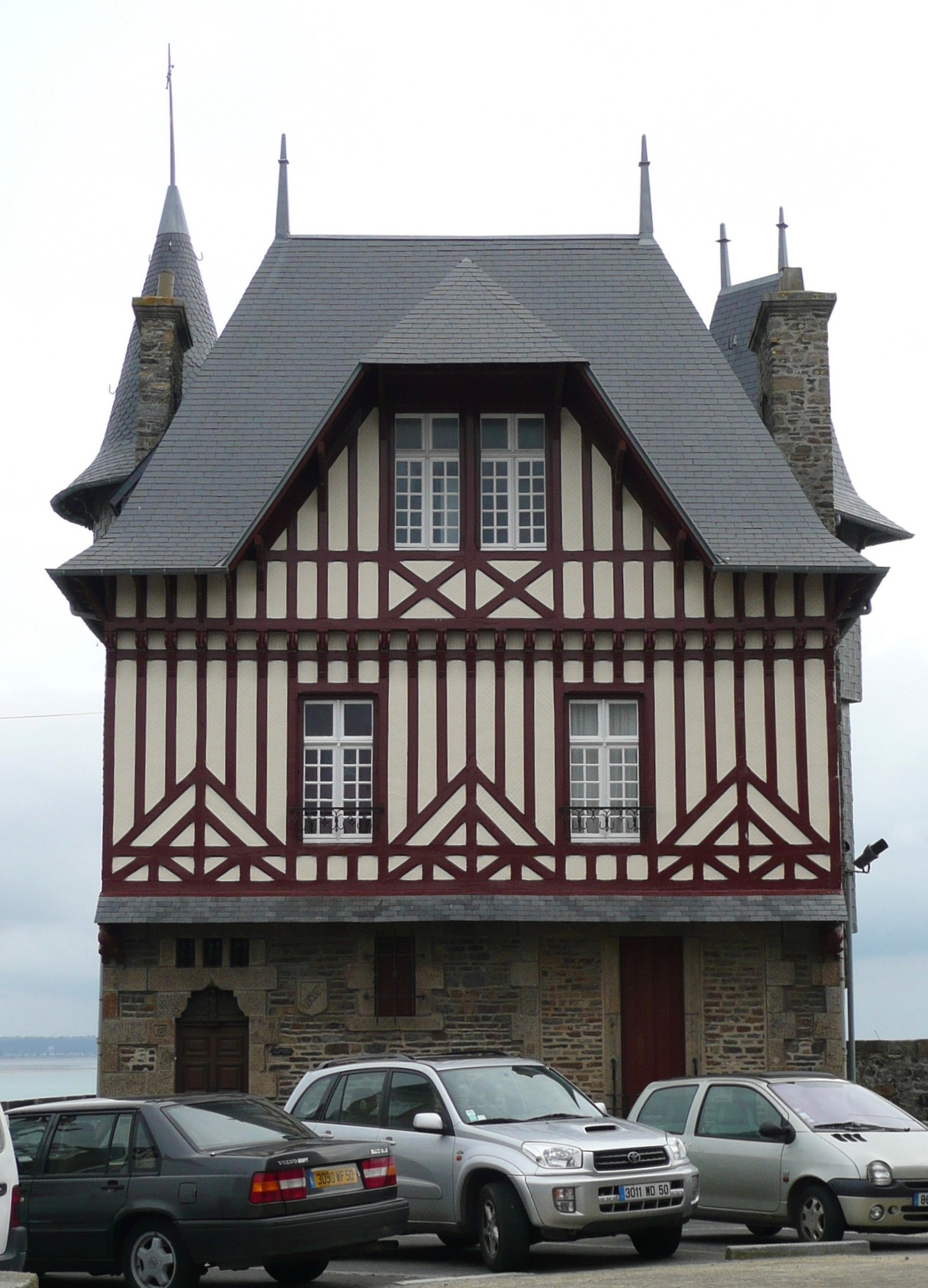
The façade of a Granville house on the rampart, Rue du Midi.

== See also ==
- Communes of the Manche department
- Douzelage
- Gare de Granville
- Granville (disambiguation)
- Granville corsairs

== Bibliography ==
- Mordal, Jacques (1964). Hold up naval à Granville. Nuit du 8 au 9 mars 1945 [Naval hold up to Granville. Night of 8 to 9 March 1945] (in French). France-Empire.
- Villand, Rémy (1984). L'activité du port de Granville en 1619 [The activity of the port of Granville in 1619] (in French). Saint-Lô: Société d'archéologie de la Manche.
- Cardot, Pierre (1990). Le clergé de Granville et des environs sous la Révolution [The clergy of Granville and its surroundings under the Revolution] (in French). Original illustrations by Ernest Cocar.
- Guidelou, M. (1990). Histoire de Granville [History of Granville] (in French). Paris: Res universis; Lorisse. ISBN 9782877605069.
- Hébert, Michel; Ernouf, Maurice (1995). Granville [Granville] (in French). Joué-lès-Tours: Alan Sutton.
- Hollande, Emmanuel (1997). Les ports de plaisance de Granville et de Barneville-Carteret: Mémoire de maîtrise [The marinas of Granville and Barneville-Carteret: Master's memories] (in French). Université de Caen.
- Marie known as Naour, Édouard; Fleury, Georges (1998). Le Port de Granville: la vie des marins-pecheurs de 1930 à nos jours [The port of Granville: The life of fishermen from 1930 to the present] (in French). Granville: Édouard Marie.
- Bordes, Isabelle; Leligny, Jean-Michel (January 2000). Pêcheurs à Granville: de la morue à la praire [Fishermen in Granville: Of the cod to the clam] (in French). Pays de Normandie.
- Hurel, Claude (December 2000). Curiosités linguistiques au Pays de Granville [Linguistic curiosities of the lands of Granville] (in French). Revue de l'Avranchin et du Pays de Granville.
- Reffuveille, Antoine (2001). La flotte corsaire de Granville pendant la guerre d'Indépendance américaine: 1778-1783 [The Granville privateer fleet during the American War of Independence: 1778-1783] (in French).
- Sinsoilliez, Robert (2001). Le siège de Granville [The siege of Granville] (in French). Saint-Lô: Société d'archéologie et d'histoire de la Manche.
- Noël Le Coutour, Elizabeth (2001). Le Merle Blanc de la Monaco du Nord: Biographie de Richard Anacréon [The Albino Blackbird of the Monaco of the North: Biography of Richard Anacréon] (in French). L'Harmattan. ISBN 9782296003880.
- Bougeard, Jacques; Goëlau, Jean-Louis; Santier, Jean-Marc (June 2003). Granville Mémoires de Carnaval [Granville Carnival Memories] (in French). Eurocibles.
- Goëlau, Jean-Louis (March 2007). Granville Ville de garnison [Granville garrison town] (in French). Eurocibles.
- Thin, Edmond (2007). Granville, Citadelle de la Mer [Granville, Citadel of the sea] (in French). Orep. ISBN 9782915762433.
- Santier, Jean-Marc (2010). Granville 70 ans de fêtes et de sports [Granville 70 years of festivals and sports] (in French). Patrimoines Médias.
- Cahierre, Anne (2009). Dictionnaire des capitaines corsaires granvillais [Dictionary of privateer captains of Granville] (in French). Archives départementales de la manche.
