= Grande-Île (Normandy) =

Island in France

- Map of Grande-Île

- Location within France

Geography
- Location: English Channel
- Coordinates: 48°52′13″N 1°49′21″W

Administration
- France
- Region: Normandy
- Department: Manche
- Commune: Granville

Demographics
- Population: 30 (1999)

Grande-Île (French pronunciation: [ɡʁɑ̃d il], lit. 'Large Island') is the largest of the islands of Chausey located near the Channel Islands off the coast of Normandy in France. The island is 1.5 kilometres (0.93 miles) long and 0.5 kilometres (0.31 miles) wide at its widest being approximately 45 hectares (110 acres) in area. It has a population of 30.

The main part of the grounds of the main island and the small islands belong to the Société Civile Immobilière des Îles Chausey, created at the beginning of the 20th century.
