= Canton of Granville =

Coordinates: 48.84°N 1.59°W

Granville
- Canton
- Interactive map of Granville
- Country: France
- Region: Normandy
- Department: Manche
- No. of communes: {{{nbcomm}}}

Government
  - Representatives (2021–2028): Sylvie Gâté; Yvan Taillebois
- Area: 29.21 km^{2} (11.28 sq mi)
- Population (2023): 21,403
  - Density: 732.7/km^{2} (1,898/sq mi)
- INSEE code: 50 13

The canton of Granville is an administrative division of the Manche department, northwestern France. Its borders were modified at the French canton reorganisation which came into effect in March 2015. Its seat is in Granville.

== Composition ==
It consists of the following communes:

1. Donville-les-Bains
2. Granville
3. Saint-Pair-sur-Mer
4. Yquelon

== Councillors ==
Election	Councillors	Party	Occupation
2015	Sylvie Gâté	DVD	Councillor of Saint-Pair-sur-Mer
2015	Jean-Marc Julienne	UDI	Councillor of Granville

== Pictures of the canton ==
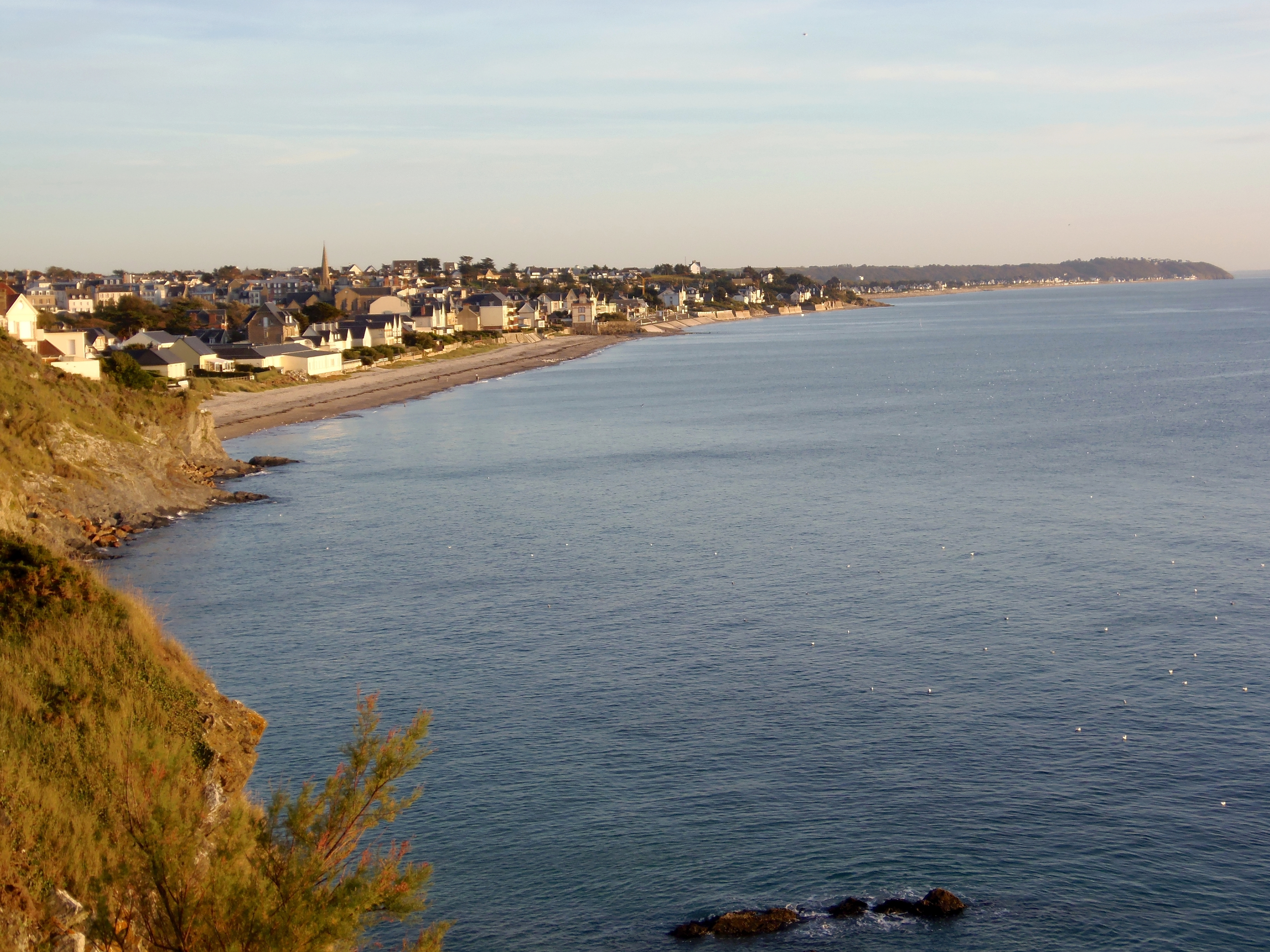
View of Saint-Pair-sur-Mer

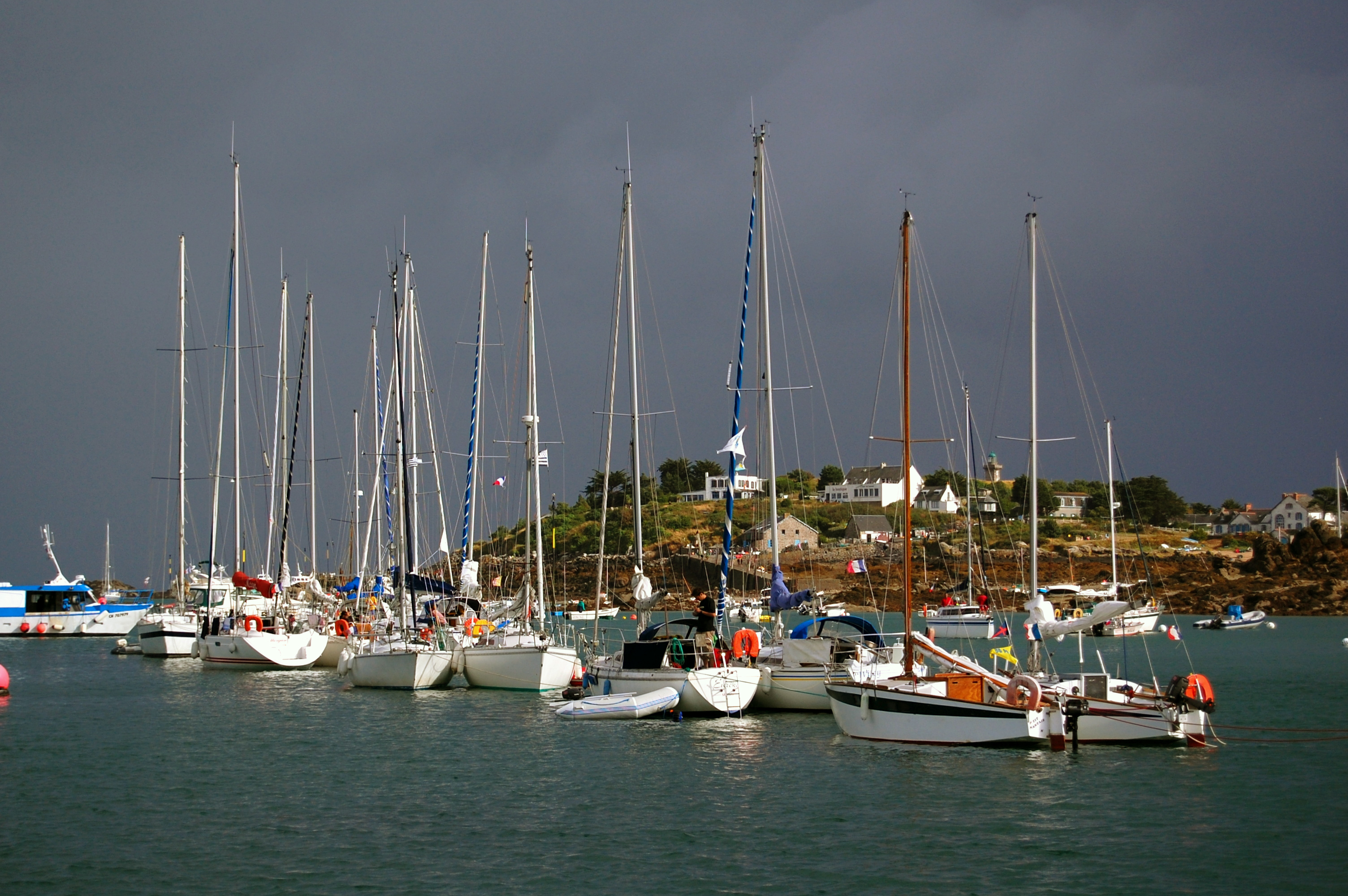
Chausey islands
