= Water Witch (1835 steamer) =

British marine vessel

History

United Kingdom
- Name: Water Witch
- Operator: 1835–1845 John Hayward, Dover; 1845–1849 Poole, Isle of Purbeck, Isle of Wight and Portsmouth Steam Packet Company, Poole; 1849–1863 North Devon Steam Packet Company, Bideford
- Builder: George Graham, Harwich
- Launched: 6 August 1835
- Fate: Broken up by 1863

General characteristics
- Tonnage: 89 tons burthen
- Length: 105 ft 9 in (32.23 m)
- Beam: 16 ft 10 in (5.13 m)
- Depth of hold: 9 ft 6 in (2.90 m)
- Installed power: 80 horsepower (60 kW)
- Propulsion: 2-cylinder beam engine driving side paddle wheels

Water Witch (or Waterwitch) was an early British wood-hulled paddle steamer, built in 1835 at Harwich, England for steam packet services from Dover to London and to Boulogne. A successful fast ship, she was later operated on services on the South Coast of England and in the Bristol Channel

== Description ==
Water Witch was launched on 6 August 1835 by George Graham in the former Royal Naval Dockyard at Harwich, Essex, (Note: Water Witch was sometimes referred to as "government-built", presumably on the basis of being built in a former naval dockyard.) completed her final outfitting on the River Thames, and arrived at Dover on 24 September 1835. She initially measured 89 tons burthen and the hull was 105 ft 9 in (32.23 m) long, 16 ft 10 in (5.13 m) in beam and 9 ft 6 in (2.90 m) deep. (Note: As a consequence of changes in regulations she was later measured as 130GRT, 74NRT, with dimensions 102 ft 0 in (31.09 m) x 13 ft 3 in (4.04 m) x 9 ft 4 in (2.84 m)) She was engined with a 2-cylinder beam engine, made by Maudslay, Sons and Field at Lambeth, of 80 horse power and driving two side paddle wheels.

== Service from Kent ports ==
The steamer was owned by John Hayward of Dover and others, including her builder George Graham, and captained by William Hayward. The Haywards were the first private operator of steam vessels from Dover, beginning with Sovereign in 1822. Built specifically for the steam packet services from Dover to London and to Boulogne, Water Witch proved to be a fast vessel, beating both British Post Office packet steamers and French state vessels in speed trials.

Initially she was partnered on the London service by the steamer Dover Castle under Capt. Luckhurst, and on sailings to Boulogne by Royal George under Capt. Swaffer, but by 1837 was fully dedicated to the Boulogne route.

On 24 June 1843, with the South Eastern Railway Company's line from London having reached Folkestone, Water Witch was specially chartered from Capt. Hayward for a trial trip by its directors and engineer, together with their guests, of a steam ferry service from Folkestone Harbour (which the company had purchased) to Boulogne. The voyage was successful, and demonstrated that a day trip to France from London was possible. Although the subsequent public services were run by ships of the New Commercial Steam Packet Company, when that company withdrew its ships in February 1844, Haywards' Water Witch and Royal George were chartered to fill the gap for ten months.

== Poole-Portsmouth steam packet ==
In early 1845 Haywards sold Water Witch to the short-lived Poole, Isle of Purbeck, Isle of Wight and Portsmouth Steam Packet Company, and she was re-registered at Poole on 31 May 1845. She was put on a twice-weekly service between Poole and Portsmouth, with calls at Brownsea Island, South Haven, Yarmouth and Cowes. In addition to the packet service, she was used as a tug to assist larger vessels entering and leaving Poole. The opening of the Southampton and Dorchester Railway in 1847 had an adverse effect on demand from passengers and for freight and they consequently looked for alternative trades for Water Witch, their only vessel; one possibility was a service between Poole and the Channel Islands. By mid-1848 other possibilities had not materialised and Water Witch was offered for sale, though a buyer was not found until the end of the year.

== Bristol Channel services ==
Water Witch began a new service for the Bideford-based North Devon Steam Packet Company in February 1849, connecting Bideford and Barnstaple with Bristol through separate weekly services to each Devon port; calls were also made at Ilfracombe and Lynmouth, and the sailings were timed to connect with the Liverpool steamers at Bristol. In September 1851, after a period offering free return passages to customers making their way to the Great Exhibition in London, the ship was advertised for sale by auction, and then again in December when her North Devon sailings had ended. She was next offered for sale in early 1853, still at Bideford, but with no indication that she had been active in 1852.

On 12 January 1857 Water Witch, after extensive repairs and with new boilers, commenced a freight service between Gloucester and Bideford, via Swansea as well as offering towage services to Bristol Channel ports.
