= Captain Hayward =

Captain William Hayward was an English sailor. He was in command of the steamer Water Witch when it undertook a trial, day return, crossing of the English Channel organized by the South Eastern Railway from Folkestone to Boulogne-sur-Mer in June 1843. The crossing was a part of the first one day round trip from London across the English Channel, which included a 2 hour 10 minute stopover for passengers in Boulogne. This crossing was considered to be the first one day round trip on this route.

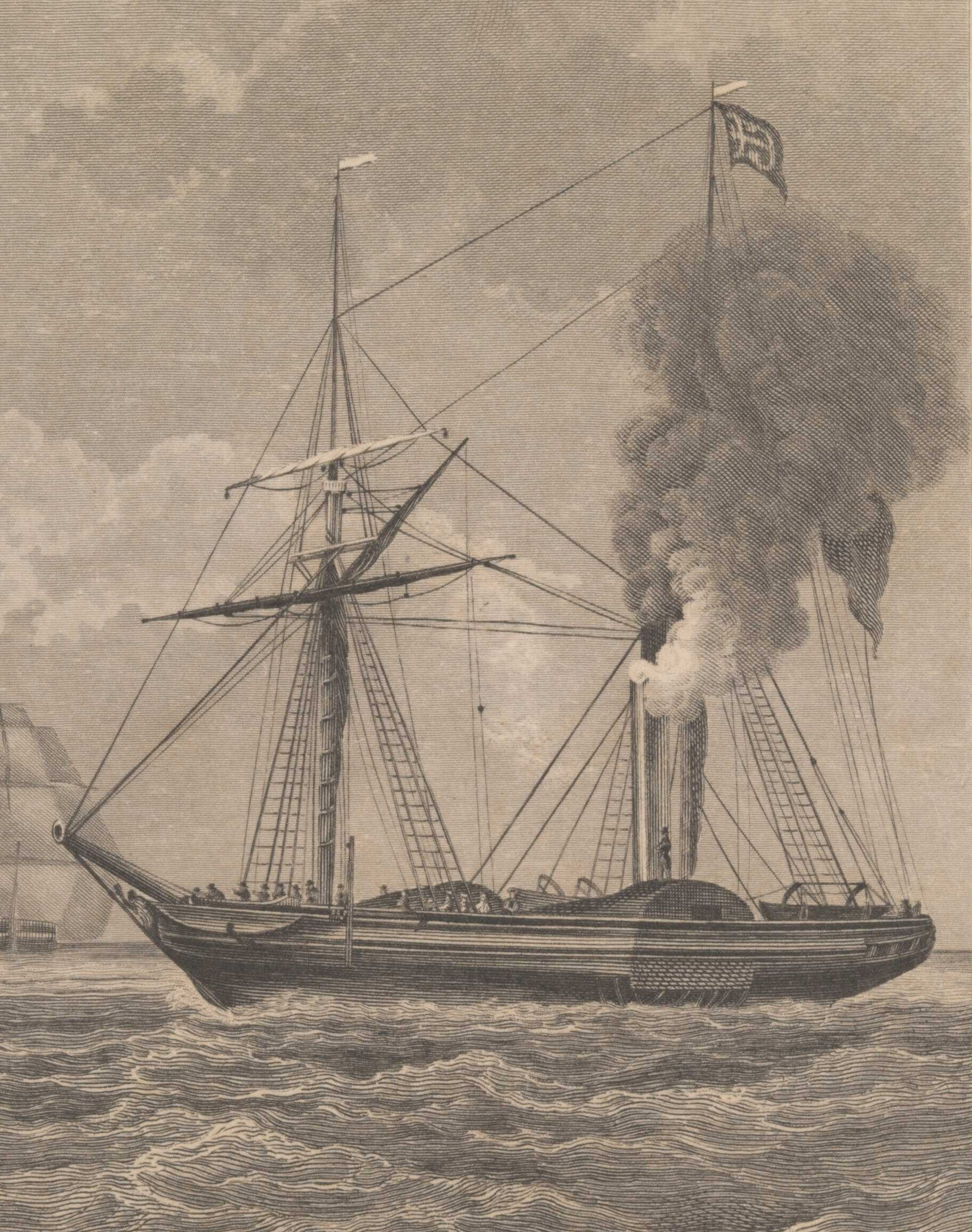
A similar steamer to Water Witch

In June 1843, because of difficulties with Dover harbour, the South Eastern Railway company developed Boulogne-sur-Mer-Folkestone route as an alternative to Calais-Dover. The first ferry crossed under the command of Captain Hayward.

On the day of the inauguration, a special train left London at 6 a.m. The distance of 82 miles (132 km) from London to Folkestone was covered in 2 hours and 40 minutes. The ferry, under the command of Captain Hayward was boarded by the party which included several members of parliament and reached Boulogne at 12:30 p.m.

After a reception by the authorities in Boulogne, after 2 hours and 10 minutes the ferry left port still under Captain Hayward's command. The ferry reached Folkestone at 6:30 p.m. and the train arrived in London at 10:05 p.m.

To honour the event, English rosarian Henry Bennett named a rose cultivar after Captain Hayward.

The new Water Witch, commanded by Captain Hayward had before this event, been carrying passengers from Dover to Boulogne, since November 1836. Two ships ran the service, the other being Royal George whose master was Captain Swaffer. The ships sailed from Dover, every Sunday, Tuesday and Friday, returning the following day.
