= Chausey =

Archipelago in Manche, France

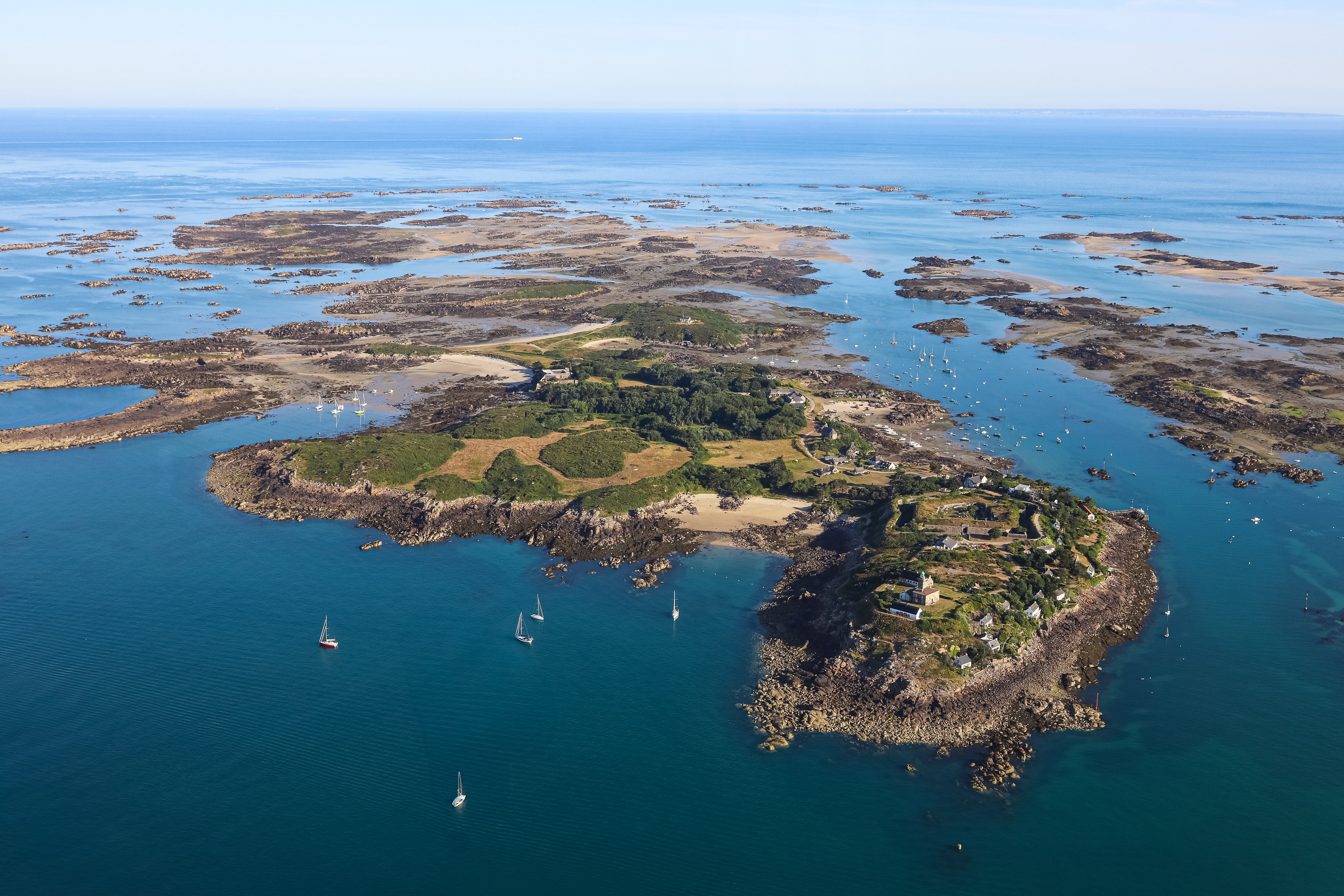
- Aerial view of Chausey

- Location within Normandy Location within France

Geography
- Location: English Channel
- Coordinates: 48°52′13″N 1°49′21″W
- Major islands: Grande Île

Administration
- France
- Region: Normandy
- Department: Manche
- Commune: Granville

Demographics
- Population: 30 (1999)

Chausey (French pronunciation: [ʃo.zɛ]) is a group of small islands, islets and rocks off the coast of Normandy, in the English Channel. It lies 17 kilometres (11 mi) from Granville and forms a quartier of the Granville commune in the Manche département.

Chausey forms part of the Channel Islands from a geographical point of view, but, because it is under French jurisdiction, it is almost never mentioned in the context of the other Channel Islands. There are no scheduled transport links between Chausey and the other Channel Islands, although between two and four daily shuttles link Chausey to mainland France through Granville, depending on the season.

The -ey ending of the name Chausey may be assumed to be associated with the Norse -ey (meaning island), as seen not only in Jersey, Guernsey, Alderney, but also islands farther away like Anglesey, Orkney and Heimaey.

== History ==
In 933, the Duchy of Normandy annexed the Channel Islands including Chausey, Minquiers and Ecrehous. (Note: This was part of a larger territorial transfer to Normandy from Brittany when Normandy obtained control of the Cotentin Peninsula.) In 1022, Richard II, Duke of Normandy, gave Chausey and the barony of Saint-Pair-sur-Mer to the Benedictine monks of Mont Saint-Michel, who built a priory on the Grande île.

The islands became subject to the Kingdom of England following the conquest of England by William, Duke of Normandy in 1066. However, in 1202, in a conflict with King John, Philip Augustus of France, claiming feudal overlordship of Normandy, summoned the English King to answer charges or forfeit all lands which he held in fee of the King of France. John refused to appear and, in 1204, Philip occupied continental Normandy, although he failed in his attempts to occupy the islands in the Channel. The 1259 Treaty of Paris confirmed the loss of Normandy but the retention of the "islands (if any) which the King of England should hold" under suzerainty of the King of France. The vassalage requirement was extinguished in the Treaty of Calais of 1360.

Chausey was for a long time an object of rivalry between England (later the United Kingdom) and France. Although the British government has contended that, until about 1764, Chausey belonged to England as with the rest of the Channel Islands, Chausey, unlike its Channel Islands neighbours, has, in fact, been French for centuries. It was administered from Jersey until the start of the 16th century, when the Jerseymen abandoned it to the French for reasons unknown. The Jersey historian Alec Podger has suggested that it was too costly in terms of money and manpower to control and, as the islands were not on the sea-lanes, it was decided that the benefits did not justify this cost. Seafarers engaged in illegal business long valued this maze of islands as a den of piracy and smuggling. The Sound, the natural channel running along the Grande île, or the Passe Beauchamp, were ideally secluded anchorages.

The fortress of Matignon was built in 1559 as a quadrangular fort with a round tower, cellars, a bakery, and a cattle shed. This was expanded in 1740. The English destroyed the fort in 1744. A new fort was built at the other end of the island, which the English also destroyed in 1756. In 1772, Louis XV granted the archipelago to the Abbot Nolin. Napoleon III ordered the construction of the present fort in 1859, and the work was completed by 1866. From then on, France consolidated its control over Chausey. The fort would briefly serve as a prison for Communards in 1871.

Although the fort ceased to be a military site in 1906, during World War I it held some 300 German and Austrian prisoners of war. The automobile engineer Louis Renault purchased it and restored it between 1922 and 1924, with the result that it became known as Château Renault. He used it as a retreat from business. During World War II German soldiers garrisoned the fort. Today the casemate serves as the home for several fishermen.

== Geography ==
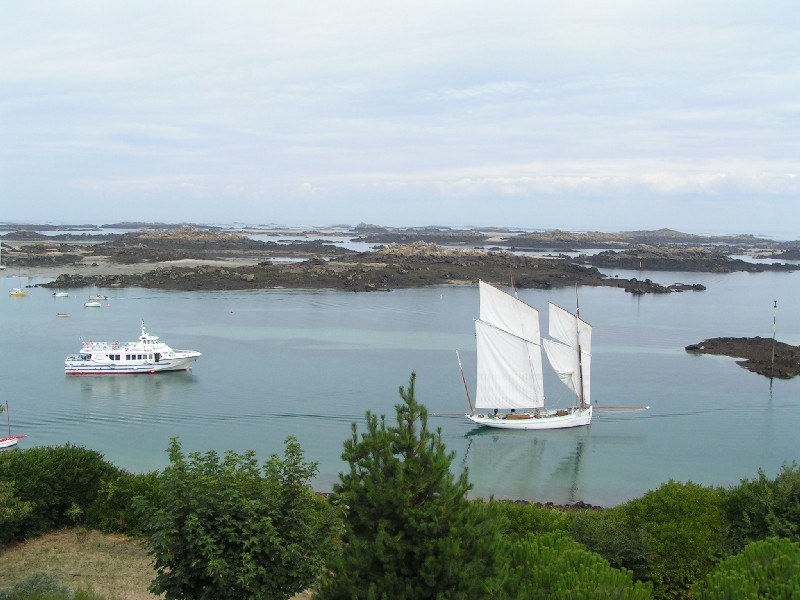
Boats in Chausey Sound. The two-master on the right is a traditional type known as a Bisquine.

Map of Chausey islands.

Grande-Île, the main island, is 1.5 kilometres (0.93 mi) long and 0.5 kilometres (0.31 mi) wide at its widest (approximately 45 hectares (110 acres)), though this is just the tip of a substantial and complex archipelago which is exposed at low tide. The archipelago comprises 365 islands at low tide, compared to only 52 islands at high tide.

From a few dozen hectares of ground above the high tide line, the archipelago increases to around 2,000 hectares (4,900 acres) at low water, within an area roughly 6.5 by 12 kilometres (4.0 by 7.5 mi). The tidal range is one of the largest in Europe, with up to 14 metres (46 ft) difference between low and high tide. The islands consist of a granitic geological formation, which has been subjected to erosion by sea and wind. Sandbars connect several parts of Chausey.

Grand Île is the only inhabited island of the group, with a population of around 30. In summer the population increases, due to the tourism which constitutes an essential activity on the island, with nearly 200,000 annual visitors. Several tourist businesses operate on the island, including a hotel, restaurant and shop. Besides tourism, fishing is the main economic activity. Lobster, shrimp, conger, bass and mullet are caught, while mussels and oysters are farmed. Until 1989, a cattle farm operated on the island. The island's granite was formerly quarried, and the stone exported. Chausey stone was used in the construction of Mont Saint-Michel.

The typical boats of Chausey are the doris (dory), a flat-bottomed boat traditionally propelled by oars or nowadays an engine, used by the fishermen, and the canot chausiais, a small clinker-built sailing boat used for pleasure. Every August, the Chausey Regatta takes place on the first weekend of the neap tide. The festivities last all weekend, during which several boat races are organized.
