= Élise (steamship) =

First steamship to cross the English Channel

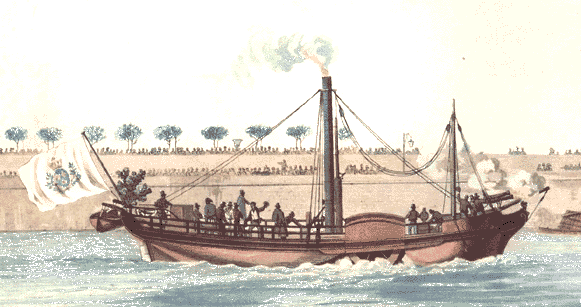

History

France
- Name: Élise
- Christened: Margery
- Completed: 1814
- Acquired: 1815
- Renamed: Renamed Élise in 1815

General characteristics
- Displacement: 70 tons
- Length: 21 m
- Propulsion: Steam engine, 14 shp
- Speed: 6 knots

The Élise was the first steamship to cross the English Channel.

The ship was constructed in Dumbarton, Scotland, in 1814. In 1815, Frenchman Pierre Andriel purchased her, and renamed her Élise. Andriel intended to accomplish a spectacular crossing of the Channel to convince public opinion that steam ships could be ocean-worthy.

The Élise departed from Newhaven on 17 March 1816, into a heavy sea. At midnight, a tempest broke out, and Andriel had to threaten his own crew at gunpoint and award three bottles of rum to the first man to spot the French coast. After 17 hours at sea, the Élise reached Le Havre.

She sailed up the Seine and arrived in Paris on 28 March, becoming a popular sensation. Two small saluting guns were mounted at the bow and fired in honour of Louis XVIII.
