= Yquelon =

- Commune
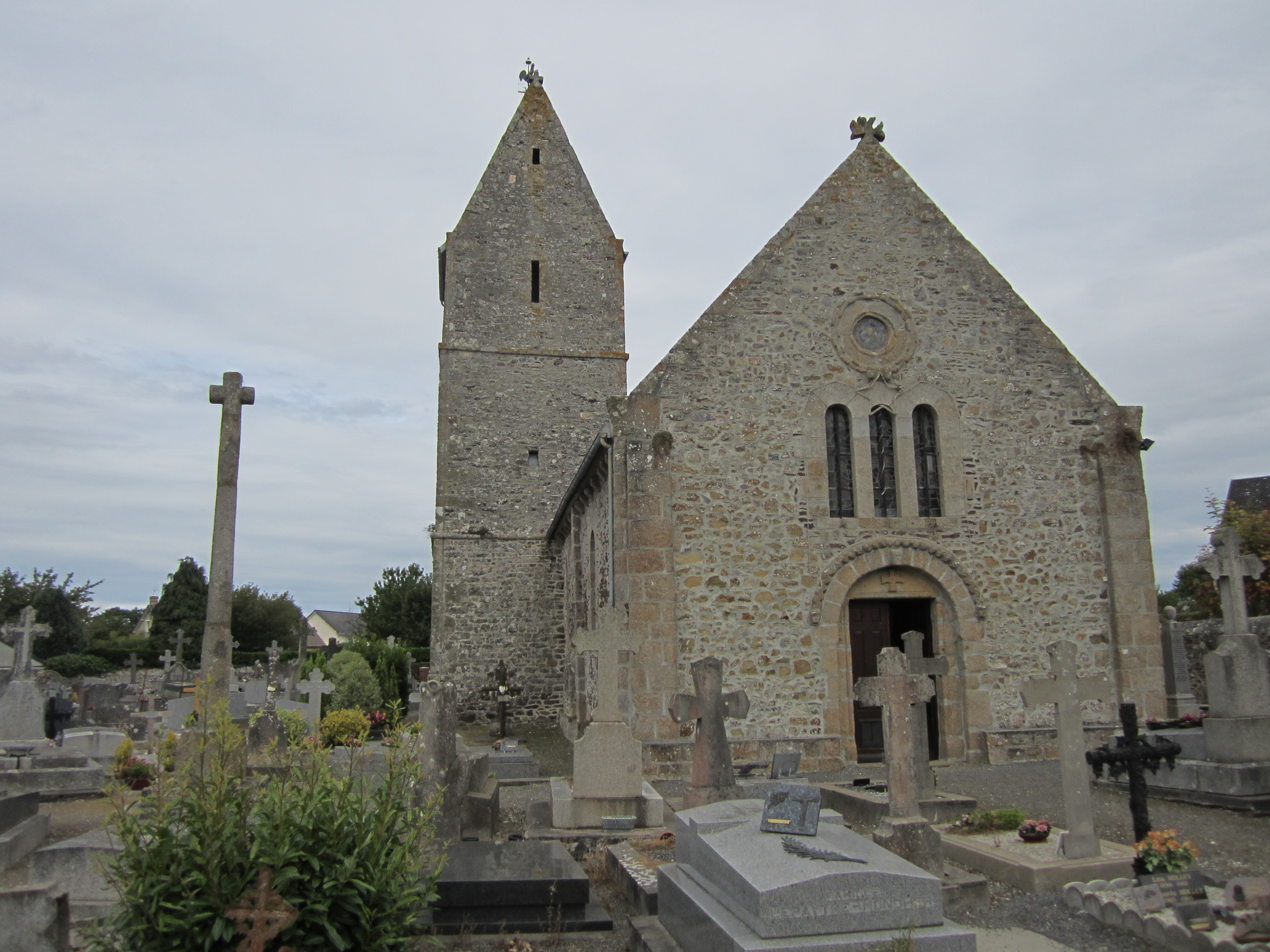
- The church in Yquelon

- Coat of arms
- Location of Yquelon
- Location within France Location within Normandy
- Coordinates: 48°50′56″N 1°33′15″W
- Country: France
- Region: Normandy
- Department: Manche
- Arrondissement: Avranches
- Canton: Granville
- Intercommunality: Granville, Terre et Mer

Government
  - Mayor (2020–2026): Stéphane Sorre
- Area^{1}: 2.14 km^{2} (0.83 sq mi)
- Highest elevation: 67 m (220 ft)
- Lowest elevation: 17 m (56 ft)
- Population (2023): 1,240
  - Density: 579/km^{2} (1,500/sq mi)
- Demonym: Yquelonnais
- Time zone: UTC+01:00 (CET)
  - Summer (DST): UTC+02:00 (CEST)
- INSEE/Postal code: 50647 /50400
- ^{1} French Land Register data, which excludes lakes, ponds, glaciers > 1 km^{2} (0.386 sq mi or 247 acres) and river estuaries.

Yquelon (French pronunciation: [iklɔ̃]) is a commune in the Manche department in Normandy in north-western France.

== Population ==
Historical population
Year	Pop.	±% p.a.
1968	426	—
1975	491	+2.05%
1982	674	+4.63%
1990	718	+0.79%
1999	958	+3.26%
2007	982	+0.31%
2012	1,040	+1.15%
2017	1,091	+0.96%
2023	1,240	+2.16%
Source: INSEE

== See also ==
- Communes of the Manche department
