= Donville-les-Bains =

- Commune
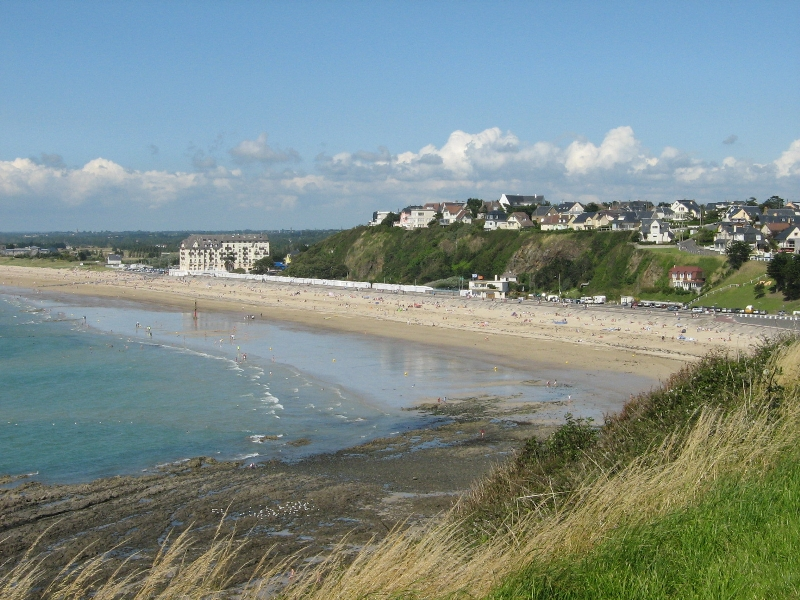
- The beach at Donville-les-Bains
- Location of Donville-les-Bains
- Location within France Location within Normandy
- Coordinates: 48°50′48″N 1°34′52″W
- Country: France
- Region: Normandy
- Department: Manche
- Arrondissement: Avranches
- Canton: Granville
- Intercommunality: Granville, Terre et Mer

Government
  - Mayor (2020–2026): Gaëlle Fagnen
- Area^{1}: 2.75 km^{2} (1.06 sq mi)
- Highest elevation: 68 m (223 ft)
- Lowest elevation: 0 m (0 ft)
- Population (2023): 3,146
  - Density: 1,140/km^{2} (2,960/sq mi)
- Demonym: Donvillais
- Time zone: UTC+01:00 (CET)
  - Summer (DST): UTC+02:00 (CEST)
- INSEE/Postal code: 50165 /50350
- Website: www.ville-donville-les-bains.fr
- ^{1} French Land Register data, which excludes lakes, ponds, glaciers > 1 km^{2} (0.386 sq mi or 247 acres) and river estuaries.

Donville-les-Bains (French pronunciation: [dɔ̃vil le bɛ̃]) is a commune in the Manche department, northwestern France.

== Introduction ==
Donville-les-Bains is located just outside Granville, a port on the Norman coast noted for ferry traffic to the Channel Islands. Rail service is available from Granville to Paris on a regular basis provided by SNCF, the French National Railway.

The town is also the origin of the English language surname Dunville/Dumville (originally Donville), which is found throughout the UK and former British colonies. People descended from this Norman line can be found in concentrations around Toronto, Thunder Bay, Chicago, Detroit, St. Louis, and South Carolina. (However, Dunville, Newfoundland was not named after Donville-les-Bains; Dunville was named after the founding Dunphy family.)

== Population ==
Historical population
Year	Pop.	±% p.a.
1968	3,419	—
1975	3,495	+0.31%
1982	3,215	−1.19%
1990	3,199	−0.06%
1999	3,351	+0.52%
2007	3,326	−0.09%
2012	3,238	−0.53%
2017	3,166	−0.45%
2023	3,146	−0.11%
Source: INSEE

== Heraldry ==
Arms of Donville-les-Bains	The arms of Donville-les-Bains are blazoned : Gules, a sea-horse [i.e. a mythical hippocampus], and in chief a sun of 8 points Or.

== See also ==
- Communes of the Manche department
