= Saint-Pair-sur-Mer =

- Commune
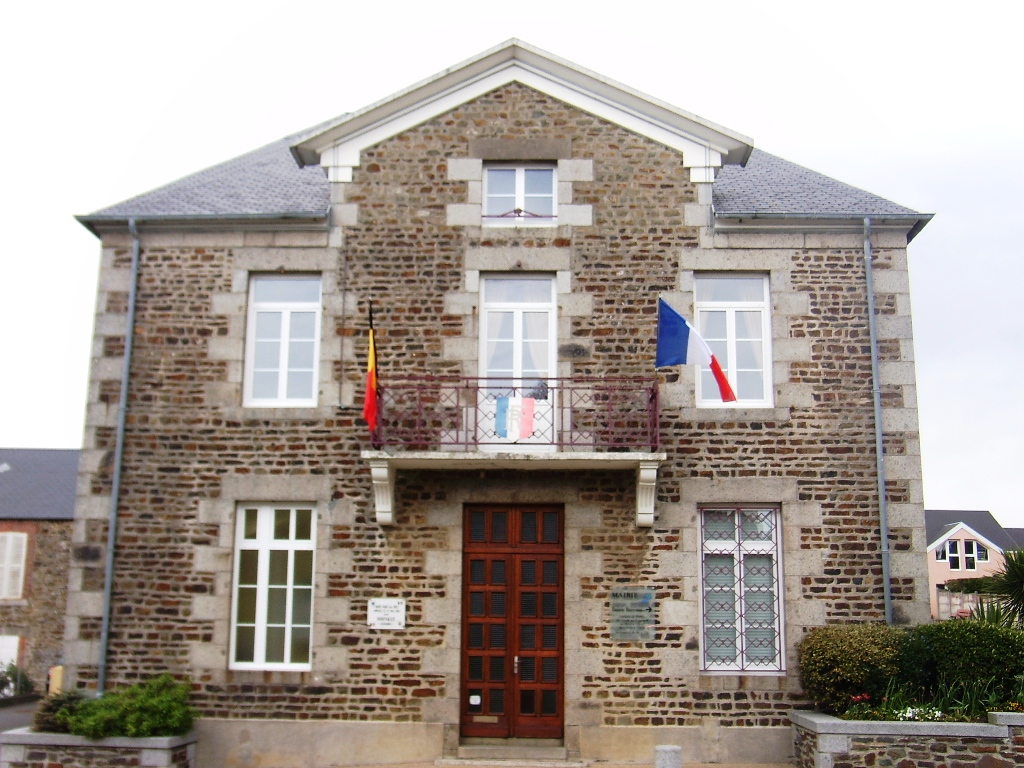
- Town hall

- Coat of arms
- Location of Saint-Pair-sur-Mer
- Location within France Location within Normandy
- Coordinates: 48°48′50″N 1°34′01″W
- Country: France
- Region: Normandy
- Department: Manche
- Arrondissement: Avranches
- Canton: Granville

Government
  - Mayor (2020–2026): Annaïg Le Jossic
- Area^{1}: 14.42 km^{2} (5.57 sq mi)
- Elevation: 40 m (130 ft)
- Highest elevation: 72 m (236 ft)
- Lowest elevation: 2 m (6.6 ft)
- Population (2023): 4,507
  - Density: 312.6/km^{2} (809.5/sq mi)
- Time zone: UTC+01:00 (CET)
  - Summer (DST): UTC+02:00 (CEST)
- INSEE/Postal code: 50532 /50380
- ^{1} French Land Register data, which excludes lakes, ponds, glaciers > 1 km^{2} (0.386 sq mi or 247 acres) and river estuaries.

Saint-Pair-sur-Mer (French pronunciation: [sɛ̃ pɛʁ syʁ mɛʁ], literally Saint-Pair on Sea) is a commune in the Manche department in Normandy in north-western France.

== Population ==
Historical population
Year	Pop.	±% p.a.
1968	1,835	—
1975	2,070	+1.74%
1982	2,540	+2.97%
1990	3,114	+2.58%
1999	3,616	+1.67%
2007	3,719	+0.35%
2012	3,949	+1.21%
2017	4,066	+0.59%
2023	4,507	+1.73%
Source: INSEE

== See also ==
- Communes of the Manche department
