= English Channel =

Body of water between Great Britain and France

- Other native names: Mor Breizh (Breton); Mor Bretennek (Cornish); La Manche (French); Lé Ch'nal (Guernésiais); Lé Ch'na (Jèrriais); La Maunche (Norman); Chele Manche (Picard)
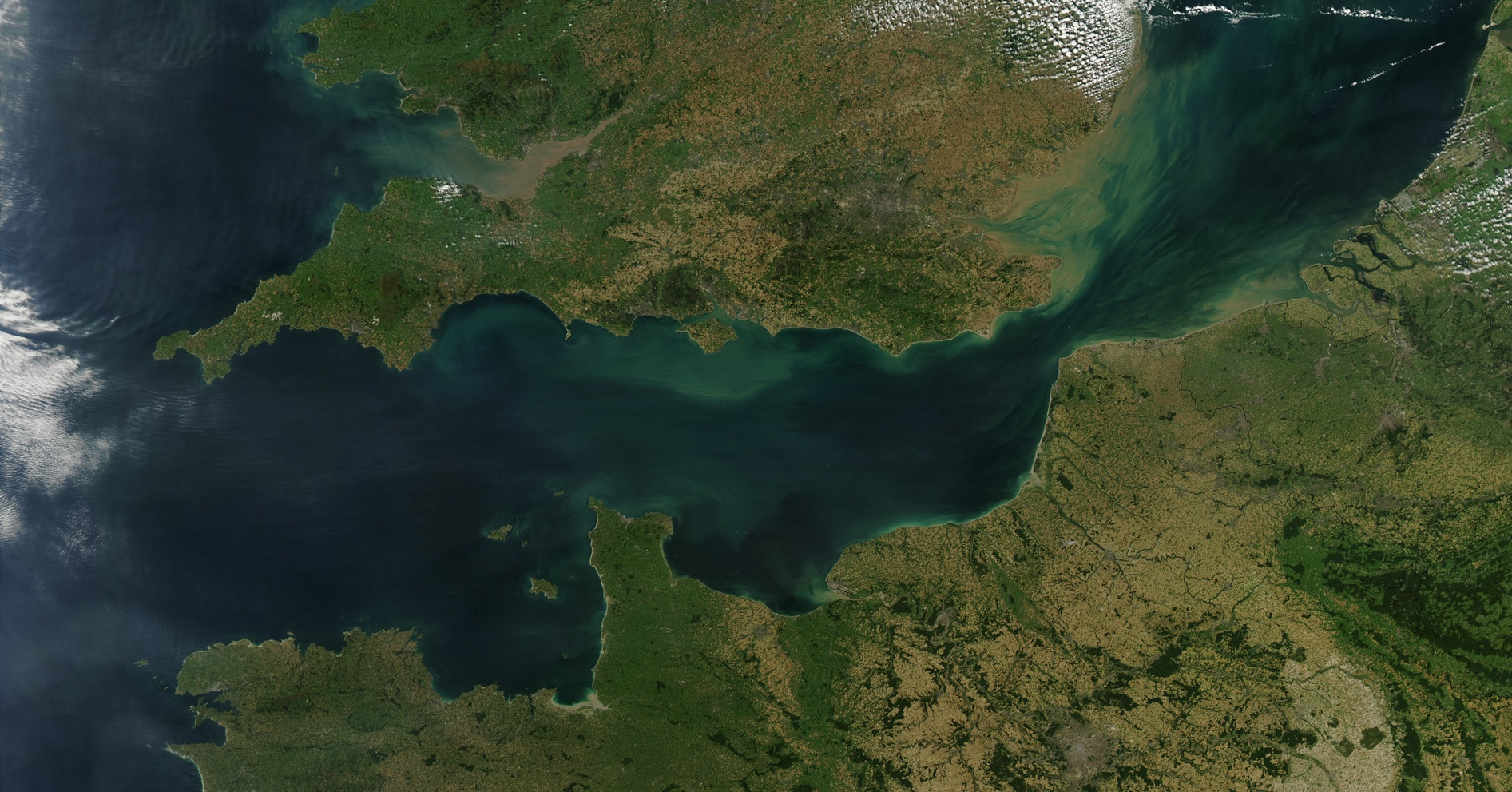

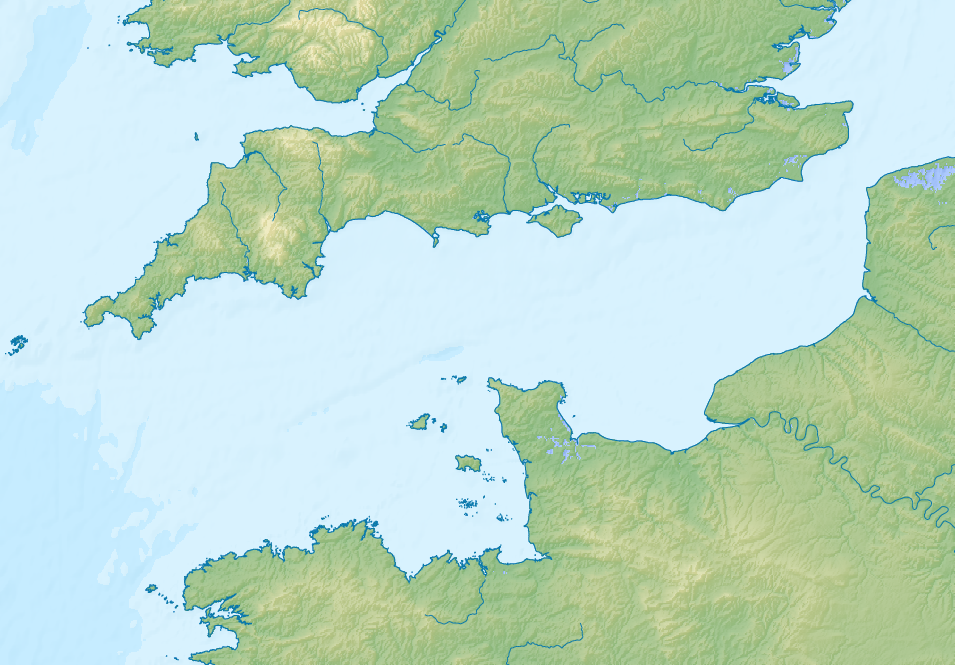
- Location within Channel Islands Location within Europe
- Location: Northwestern Europe; between the Celtic and North Seas
- Coordinates: 50.2°N 2°W
- Part of: Atlantic Ocean
- Primary inflows: River Exe; Seine; River Test; River Tamar; Somme
- Basin countries: England (UK); France; Guernsey; Jersey
- Max. length: 560 km (350 mi)
- Max. width: 240 km (150 mi)
- Surface area: 75,000 km^{2} (29,000 sq mi)
- Average depth: 63 m (207 ft)
- Max. depth: 174 m (571 ft) at Hurd's Deep
- Water volume: 9,000 km^{3} (2,200 cu mi) (approx.)
- Salinity: 3.4–3.5%
- Max. temperature: 20 °C (68 °F)
- Min. temperature: 5 °C (41 °F)
- Islands: Île de Bréhat; Île de Batz; Chausey; Tatihou; Mont-Saint-Michel; Îles Saint-Marcouf; Isle of Wight; Burgh Island; Drake's Island; Looe Island; St Michael's Mount; Jersey; Guernsey; Alderney; Sark; Herm
- Settlements: Bournemouth; Brighton; Plymouth; Portsmouth; Southampton; Calais; Boulogne-sur-Mer; Dieppe; Le Havre

The English Channel, (Note: French: la Manche, "The Sleeve"; Norman: la Maunche, "The Sleeve" (Cotentinais) or lé Ch'na (Jèrriais), lé Ch'nal (Guernésiais), "The Channel"; Breton: Mor Breizh, "Sea of Brittany"; Welsh: Môr Udd, "Lord's Sea"; Cornish: Mor Bretennek, "British Sea"; Dutch: Het Kanaal, "The Channel"; German: Ärmelkanal, "Sleeve Channel") also known as the Channel, is an arm of the Atlantic Ocean that separates Southern England from northern France. It links to the southern part of the North Sea by the Strait of Dover at its northeastern end. It is the busiest shipping area in the world.

It is about 560 kilometres (300 nautical miles; 350 statute miles) long and varies in width from 240 km (130 nmi; 150 mi) at its widest to 34 km (18 nmi; 21 mi) at its narrowest in the Strait of Dover. It is the smallest of the shallow seas around the continental shelf of Europe, covering an area of some 75,000 square kilometres (22,000 square nautical miles; 29,000 square miles).

The Channel aided the United Kingdom in becoming a naval superpower, serving as a natural defence against invasions, such as in the Napoleonic Wars and in the Second World War.

The northern (English) coast of the Channel is more populous than the southern (French) coast. The major languages spoken in this region are English and French.

== Names ==
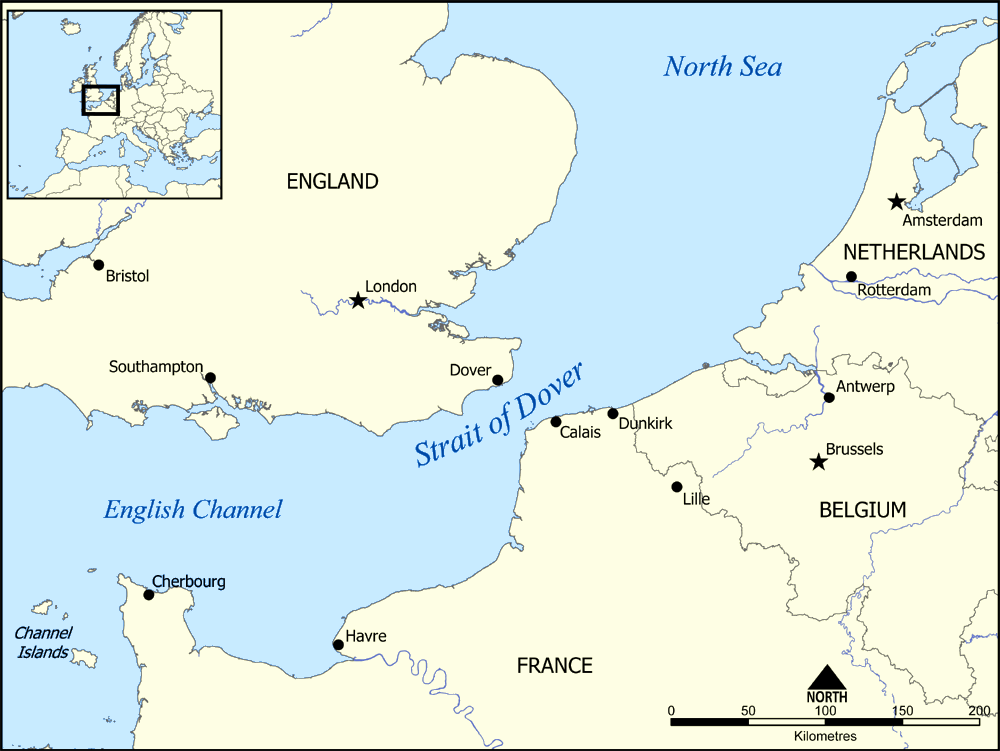
The Strait of Dover between England and France is the narrowest part of the English Channel, which separates Great Britain from continental Europe, and marks the boundary between the Channel and the North Sea.

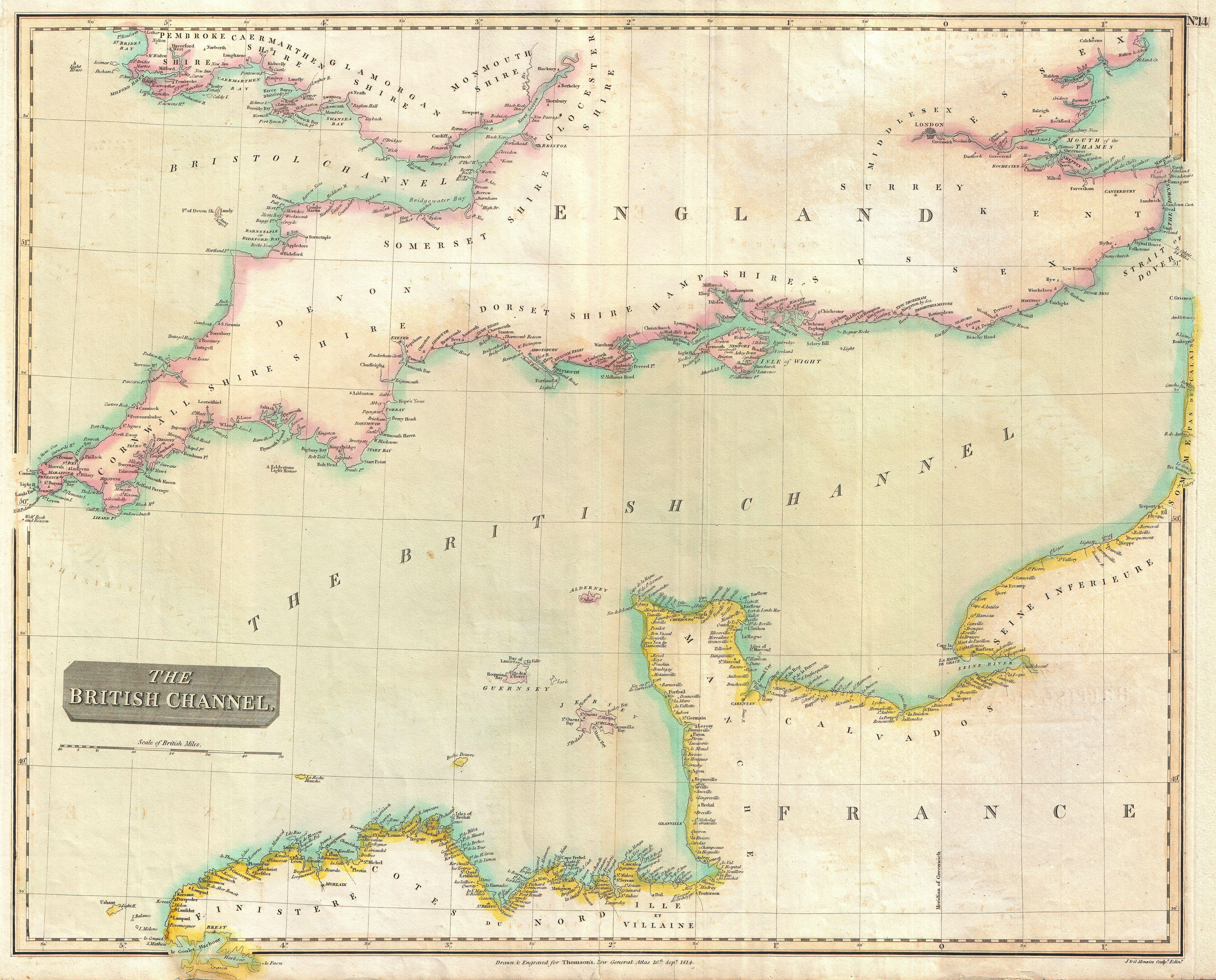
Thomson's map of 'The British Channel'

Roman sources named the Channel Oceanus Britannicus (or Mare Britannicum, meaning the Ocean, or the Sea, of the Britons or Britannī). Variations of this term were used by influential writers such as Ptolemy, and remained popular with British and continental authors well into the modern era. Other Latin names for the sea include Oceanus Gallicus (the Gaulish Ocean) which was used by Isidore of Seville in the sixth century.

The term British Sea is still used by speakers of Cornish and Breton, with the sea known to them as Mor Bretennek and Mor Breizh respectively. While it is likely that these names derive from the Latin term, it is possible that they predate the arrival of the Romans in the area. The modern Welsh is often given as Môr Udd (the Lord's or Prince's Sea); however, this name originally described both the Channel and the North Sea combined.

Anglo-Saxon texts make reference to the sea as Sūð-sǣ (South Sea), but this term fell out of favour, as later English authors followed the same conventions as their Latin and Norman contemporaries. One English name that did persist was the Narrow Seas, a collective term for the channel and North Sea. As England (followed by Great Britain and the United Kingdom) claimed sovereignty over the sea, a Royal Navy Admiral was appointed with maintaining duties in the two seas. The office was maintained until 1822, when several European nations (including the United Kingdom) adopted a three-mile (4.8 km) limit to territorial waters.

=== English Channel ===
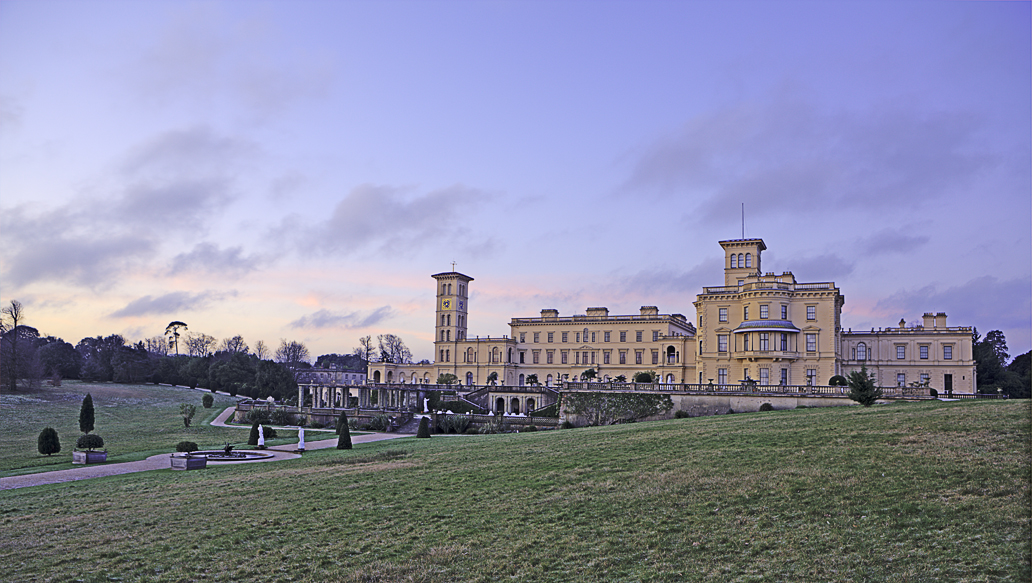
Osborne House, the summer retreat of Queen Victoria on the Isle of Wight. Starting from the late 18th century, settlements on and around the English Channel coastline in England grew rapidly into thriving seaside resorts, bolstered by their association with royalty and the middle and upper classes.

The word channel was first recorded in Middle English in the 13th century and was borrowed from the Old French word chanel (a variant form of chenel 'canal'). By the middle of the fifteenth century, an Italian map based on Ptolemy's description named the sea as Britanicus Oceanus nunc Canalites Anglie (Ocean of the Britons but now English Channel). The map is possibly the first recorded use of the term English Channel and the description suggests the name had recently been adopted.

In the sixteenth century, Dutch maps referred to the sea as the Engelse Kanaal (English Channel) and by the 1590s, William Shakespeare used the word Channel in his history plays of Henry VI, suggesting that by that time, the name was popularly understood by English people.

By the eighteenth century, the name English Channel was in common usage in England. Following the Acts of Union 1707, this was replaced in official maps and documents with British Channel or British Sea for much of the next century. However, the term English Channel remained popular and was finally in official usage by the nineteenth century.

=== La Manche ===
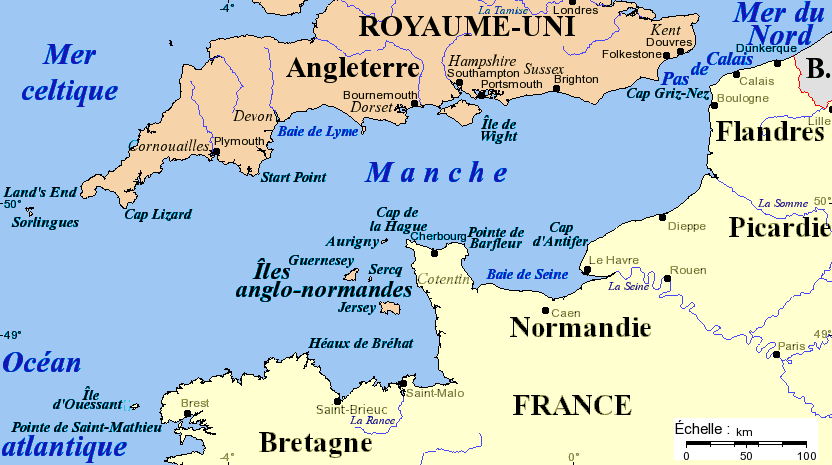
Map of the channel area with French nomenclature

The French name la Manche has been used since at least the 17th century. The name is usually said to refer to the sleeve (la manche) shape of the Channel. Folk etymology has derived it from a Celtic word meaning 'channel' that is also the source of the name for the Minch in Scotland, but this name is not attested before the 17th century, and French and British sources of that time are clear about its etymology. The name in French has been directly adapted in other languages as either a calque, such as Canale della Manica in Italian or the Ärmelkanal in German, or a direct borrowing, such as Canal de La Mancha in Spanish.

== Nature ==
=== Geography ===
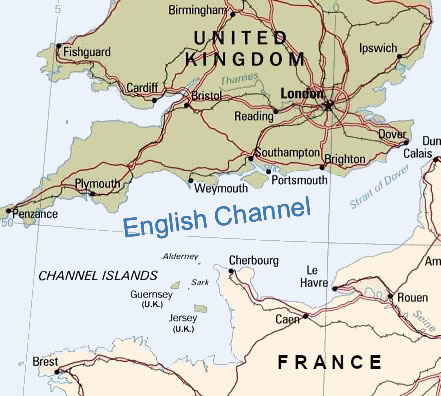
Map of the English Channel

The International Hydrographic Organization defines the limits of the English Channel as:

- On the West. From the coast of Brittany westward along the parallel (48°28' N) of the East extreme of Ushant (Lédénès), through this island to West extreme thereof (Pointe de Pern), thence to the Bishop Rock, the Southwest extreme of the Scilly Isles, and on a line passing to the Westward of these Isles as far as the North extreme (Lion Rock) and thence Eastward to the Longships (50°04' N) and on to Lands End.
- On the East. The Southwestern limit of the North Sea.

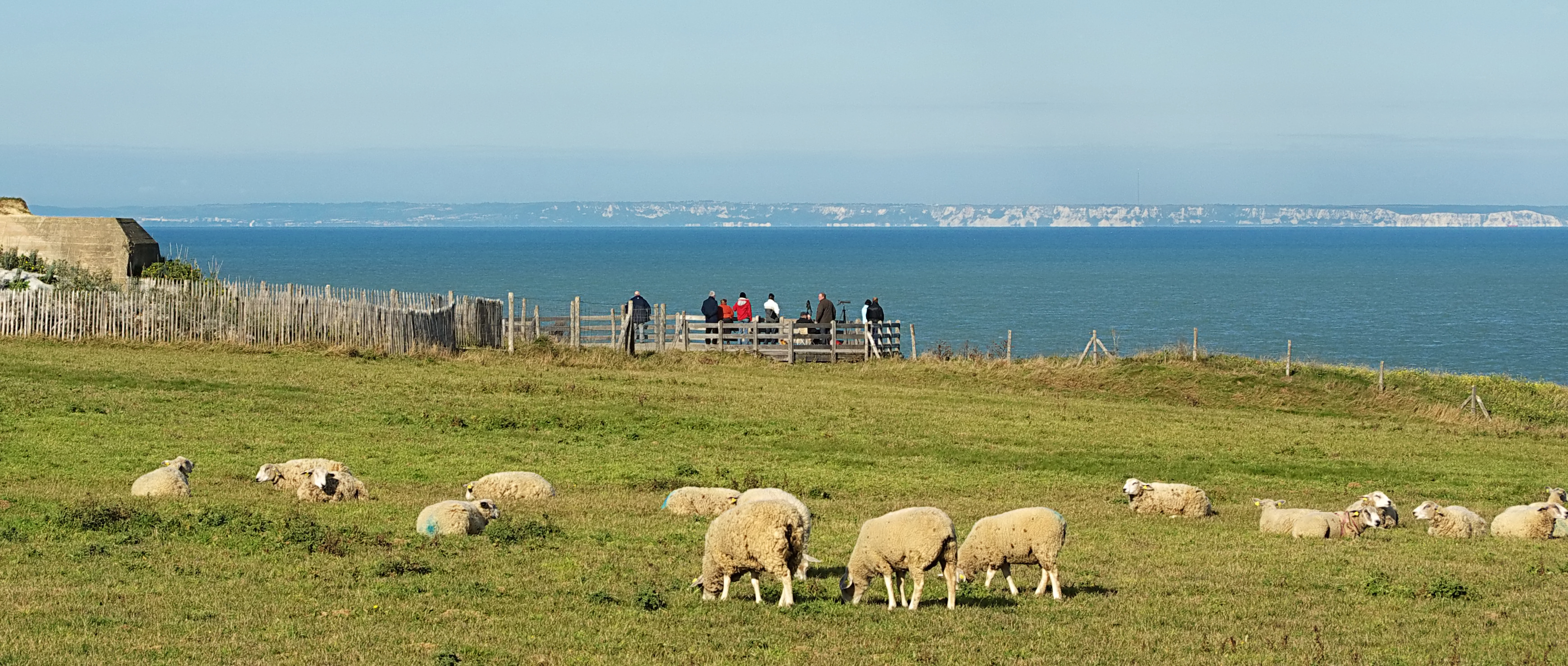
The Strait of Dover viewed from France, looking towards England. The white cliffs of Dover on the English coast are visible from France on a clear day.

The Strait of Dover (French: Pas de Calais), at the Channel's eastern end, is its narrowest point, while its widest point lies between Lyme Bay and the Gulf of Saint Malo, near its midpoint. Well on the continental shelf, it has an average depth of about 120 m (390 ft) at its widest; yet averages about 45 m (148 ft) between Dover and Calais, its notable sandbank hazard being Goodwin Sands. Eastwards from there the adjoining North Sea reduces to about 26 m (85 ft) across the Broad Fourteens (14 fathoms) where it lies over the southern cusp of the former land bridge between East Anglia and the Low Countries. The North Sea reaches much greater depths east of northern Britain. The Channel descends briefly to 180 m (590 ft) in the submerged valley of Hurd's Deep, 48 km (30 mi) west-northwest of Guernsey.

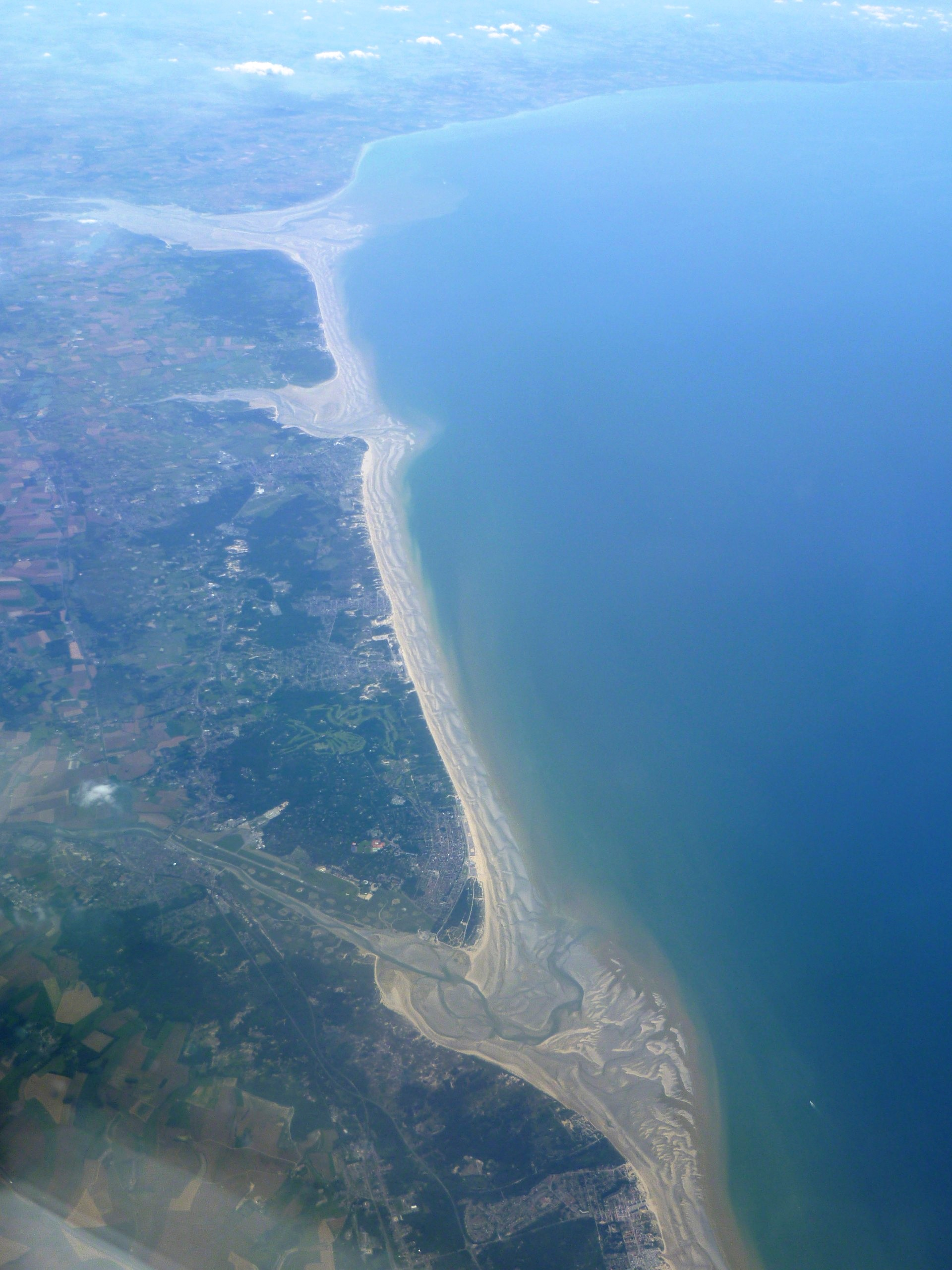
Three French river mouths. Top to bottom: the Somme, the Authie and the Canche.

There are several major islands in the Channel, the most notable being the Isle of Wight off the English coast, and the Channel Islands, British Crown Dependencies off the coast of France. The coastline, particularly on the French shore, is deeply indented, with several small islands close to the coastline, including Chausey and Mont-Saint-Michel. The Cotentin Peninsula on the French coast juts out into the Channel, with the wide Bay of the Seine (French: Baie de Seine) to its east. On the English side there is a small parallel strait, the Solent, between the Isle of Wight and the mainland. The Celtic Sea is to the west of the Channel.

The Channel acts as a funnel that amplifies the tidal range from less than a metre at sea in eastern places to more than 6 metres in the Channel Islands, the west coast of the Cotentin Peninsula and the north coast of Brittany in monthly spring tides. The time difference of about six hours between high water at the eastern and western limits of the Channel is indicative of the tidal range being amplified further by resonance. Amphidromic points are the Bay of Biscay and varying more in precise location in the far south of the North Sea, meaning both those associated eastern coasts repel the tides effectively, leaving the Strait of Dover as every six hours the natural bottleneck short of its consequent gravity-induced repulsion of the southward tide (surge) of the North Sea (equally from the Atlantic). The Channel does not experience, but its existence is necessary to explain the extent of North Sea storm surges, such as necessitate the Thames Barrier, Delta Works, Zuiderzee works (Afsluitdijk and other dams).

In the UK Shipping Forecast the Channel is divided into the following areas, from the east:

- Dover
- Wight
- Portland
- Plymouth

=== Geological origins ===
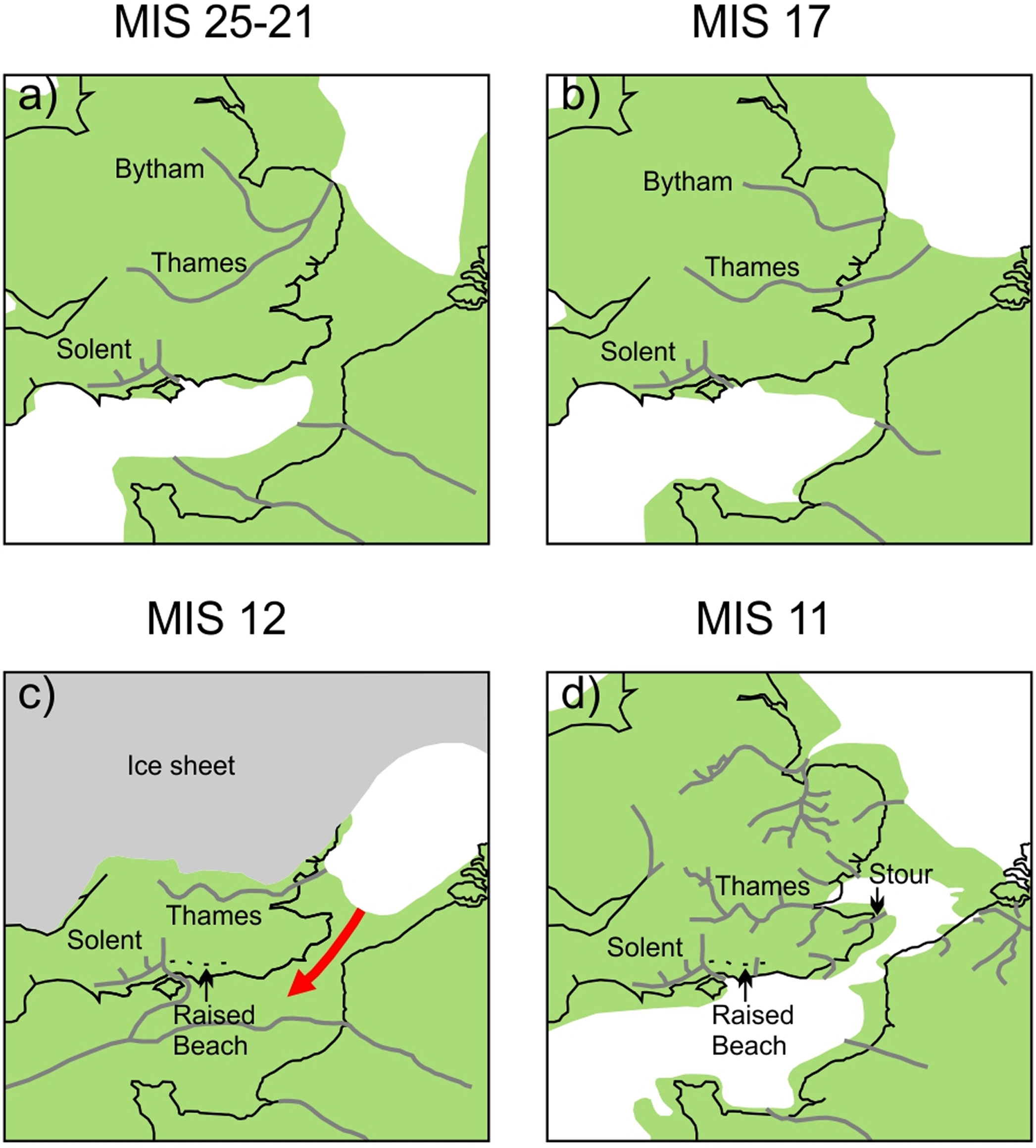
Early stages of the formation of the English Channel, spanning from Marine Isotope Stages (MIS) 25-21 (prior to 900,000 years ago) to the proglacial lake during the Anglian Glaciation (MIS 12 c. 480-430,000 years ago) to the situation during the following Hoxnian interglacial (MIS 11, c. 425-375,000 years ago)

The full English Channel connecting the North Sea to the Western Atlantic via the Strait of Dover is of geologically recent origin, having formed late in the Pleistocene period. The English Channel first developed as an arm of the Atlantic Ocean during the Pliocene period (5.3-2.6 million years ago) as a result of differential tectonic uplift along pre-existing tectonic weaknesses during the Oligocene and Miocene periods. During this early period, the Channel did not connect to the North Sea, with Britain and Ireland remaining part of continental Europe, linked by an unbroken Weald–Artois anticline, a ridge running between the Dover and Calais regions. During Pleistocene glacial periods this ridge acted as a natural dam holding back a large freshwater pro-glacial lake in the Doggerland region, now submerged under the North Sea. During this period, the North Sea and almost all of the British Isles were covered by ice. The lake was fed by meltwater from the Baltic and from the Caledonian and Scandinavian ice sheets that joined to the north, blocking its exit. The sea level was about 120 m (390 ft) lower than it is today. Then, between 450,000 and 180,000 years ago, at least two catastrophic glacial lake outburst floods breached the Weald–Artois anticline. These contributed to creating some of the deepest parts of the channel such as Hurd's Deep.

The first flood of 450,000 years ago (during the Anglian Glaciation/ MIS 12) would have lasted for several months, releasing as much as one million cubic metres of water per second. The flood started with large but localised waterfalls over the ridge, which excavated depressions now known as the Fosses Dangeard. The flow eroded the retaining ridge, causing the rock dam to fail and releasing lake water into the Atlantic. After multiple episodes of changing sea level, during which the Fosses Dangeard were largely infilled by various layers of sediment, another catastrophic flood some 180,000 years ago carved a large bedrock-floored valley, the Lobourg Channel, some 500 m wide and 25 m deep, from the southern North Sea basin through the centre of the Straits of Dover and into the English Channel. It left streamlined islands, longitudinal erosional grooves, and other features characteristic of catastrophic megaflood events, still present on the sea floor and now revealed by high-resolution sonar. Through the scoured channel passed a river, the Channel River, which drained the combined Rhine and Thames westwards to the Atlantic.

The flooding destroyed the ridge that connected Britain to continental Europe, although a land connection across the southern North Sea would have existed intermittently at later times when periods of glaciation resulted in lowering of sea levels.

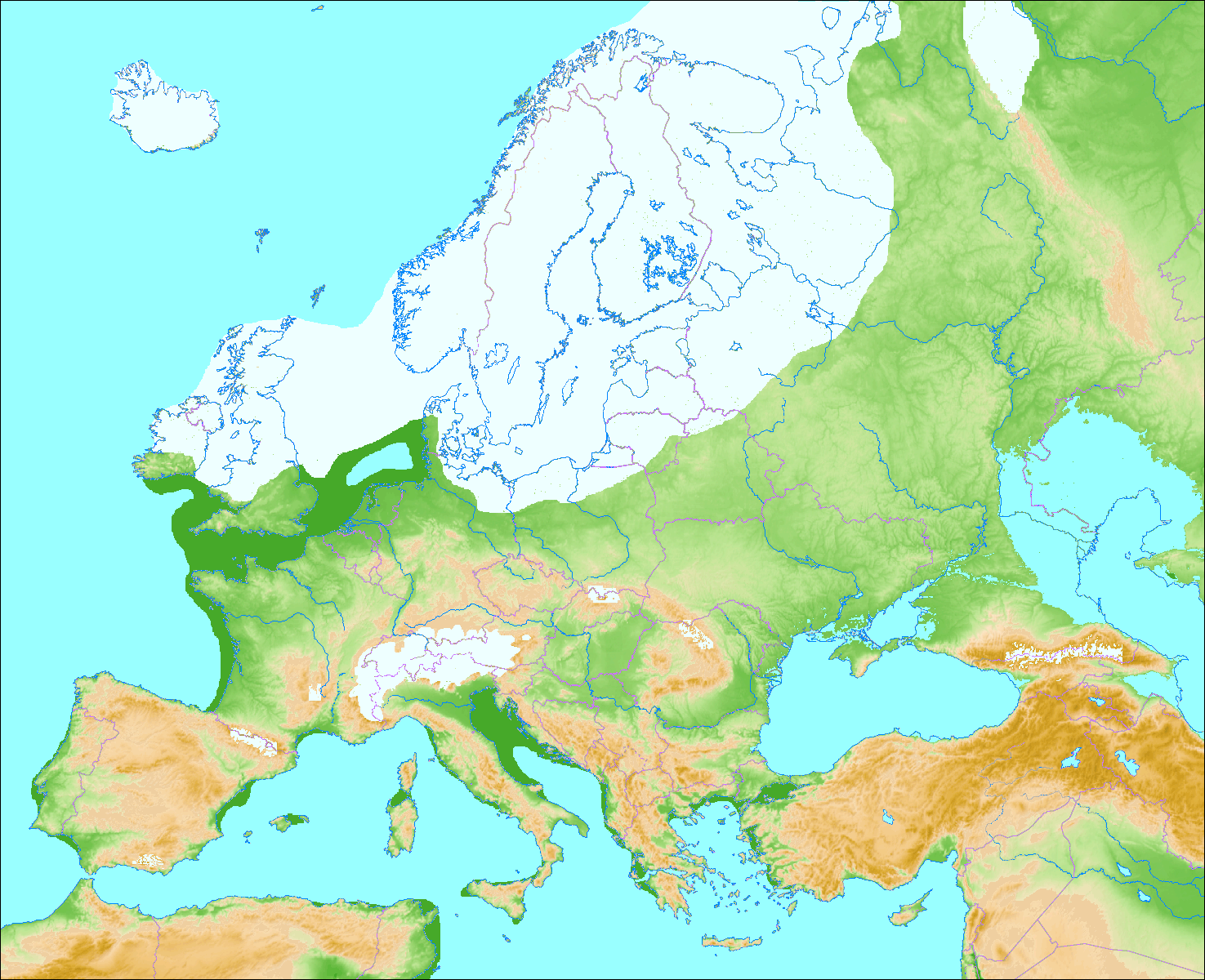
Europe during the Last Glacial Maximum c. 20,000 years ago

During interglacial periods (when sea levels were high) between the initial flooding 450,000 years ago until around 180,000 years ago, the Channel would still have been separated from the North Sea by a land bridge to the north of the Strait of Dover (the Strait of Dover at this time formed part of an estuary fed by the Thames and Scheldt), restricting interchange of marine fauna between the Channel and the North Sea (except perhaps by occasional overtopping). During the Last Interglacial/Eemian (115–130,000 years ago) the connection between the North Sea and the English Channel was fully open as it is today, resulting in Britain being an island during this interval, before lowered sea levels reconnected it to the continent during the Last Glacial Period. From the end of the Last Glacial Period, to the beginning of the Holocene rising sea levels again resulted in the unimpeded connection between the North Sea and the English Channel resuming due to the sinking of Doggerland, with Britain again becoming an island.

=== Ecology ===
As a busy shipping lane, the Channel experiences environmental problems following accidents involving ships with toxic cargo and oil spills. Indeed, over 40% of the UK incidents threatening pollution occur in or very near the Channel. One occurrence was the MSC Napoli, which on 18 January 2007 was beached with nearly 1700 tonnes of dangerous cargo in Lyme Bay, a protected World Heritage Site coastline. The ship had been damaged and was en route to Portland Harbour.

The English Channel, despite being a busy shipping lane, remains in part a haven for wildlife. Atlantic oceanic species are more common in the westernmost parts of the channel, particularly to the west of Start Point, Devon, but can sometimes be found further east towards Dorset and the Isle of Wight. Seal sightings are becoming more common along the English Channel, with both grey seal and harbour seal recorded frequently.

== Human history ==
The Channel is thought to have prevented Neanderthals from colonising Britain during the Last Interglacial/Eemian, though they returned to Britain during the Last Glacial Period when sea levels were lower. The Channel has in historic times been both an easy entry for seafaring people and a key natural defence, halting invading armies while in conjunction with control of the North Sea allowing Britain to blockade the continent. For nearly a thousand years, the Channel also provided a link between the Celtic Britons and Armorica, with modern Brittany being founded by British settlers during the Migration Period. In more peaceful times, the Channel served as a link joining shared cultures and political structures, particularly the huge Angevin Empire from 1135 to 1217.

The most significant failed invasion threats came when the Dutch and Belgian ports were held by a major continental power, e.g. from the Spanish Armada in 1588, Napoleon during the Napoleonic Wars, and Nazi Germany during World War II. Successful invasions include the Roman conquest of Britain, the Norman Conquest in 1066 and the Glorious Revolution of 1688, while the concentration of excellent harbours in the Western Channel on Britain's south coast made possible the largest amphibious invasion in history, the Normandy Landings in 1944. Channel naval battles include the Battle of the Downs (1639), Battle of Dover (1652), the Battle of Portland (1653) and the Battle of La Hougue (1692).

In February 1684, ice formed on the sea in a belt 4.8 km (3.0 mi) wide off the coast of Kent and 3.2 km (2.0 mi) wide on the French side.

=== Route to Britain ===
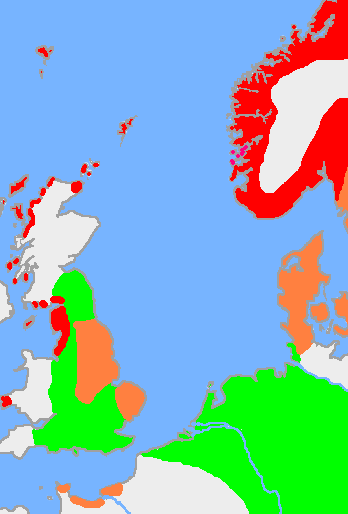
The approximate extent of Old Norse and related languages in the early 10th century around the North Sea: Old West Norse Old East Norse Other Germanic languages with which Old Norse still retained some mutual intelligibility

Remnants of a Mesolithic boatyard have been found on the Isle of Wight. Wheat was traded across the Channel about 8,000 years ago. "... Sophisticated social networks linked the Neolithic front in southern Europe to the Mesolithic peoples of northern Europe." The Ferriby Boats, Hanson Log Boats and the later Dover Bronze Age Boat could carry a substantial cross-Channel cargo.

Diodorus Siculus and Pliny both suggest trade between the rebel Celtic tribes of Armorica and Iron Age Britain flourished. In 55 BC Julius Caesar invaded, claiming that the Britons had aided the Veneti against him the previous year. He was more successful in 54 BC, but Britain was not fully established as part of the Roman Empire until Aulus Plautius's 43 AD invasion. A brisk and regular trade began between ports in Roman Gaul and those in Britain. This traffic continued until the end of Roman rule in Britain in 410 AD, after which the early Anglo-Saxons left less clear historical records.

In the power vacuum left by the retreating Romans, the Germanic Angles, Saxons, and Jutes began the next great migration across the North Sea. Having already been used as mercenaries in Britain by the Romans, many people from these tribes crossed during the Migration Period, conquering and perhaps displacing the native Celtic populations.

=== Norsemen and Normans ===
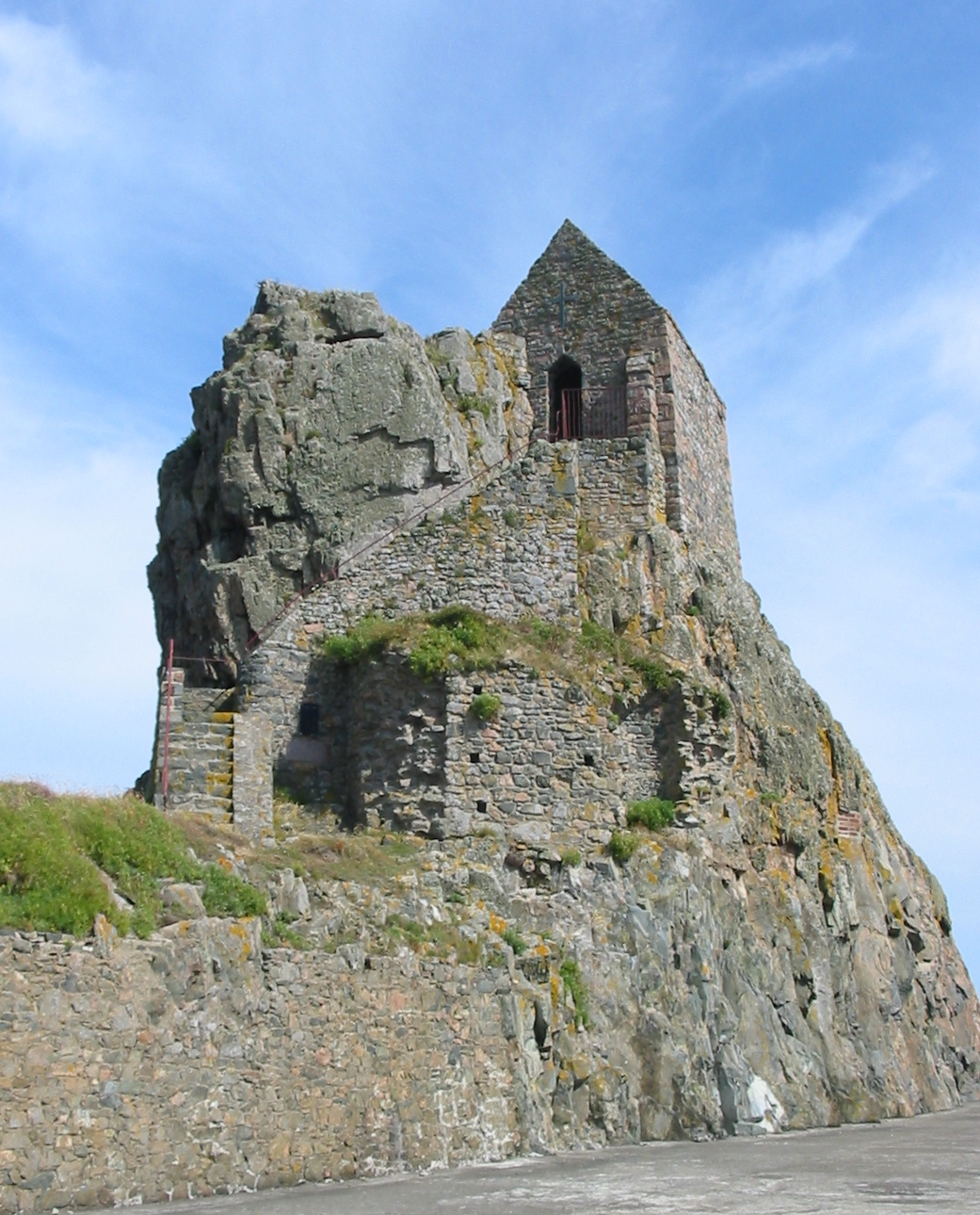
The Hermitage of St Helier lies in the bay off Saint Helier and is accessible on foot at low tide.

The attack on Lindisfarne in 793 is generally considered the beginning of the Viking Age. For the next 250 years the Scandinavian raiders of Norway, Sweden, and Denmark dominated the North Sea, raiding monasteries, homes, and towns along the coast and along the rivers that ran inland. According to the Anglo-Saxon Chronicle they began to settle in Britain in 851. They continued to settle in the British Isles and the continent until around 1050, with some raids recorded along the channel coast of England, including at Wareham, Portland, near Weymouth and along the river Teign in Devon.

The fiefdom of Normandy was created for the Viking leader Rollo (also known as Robert of Normandy). Rollo had besieged Paris but in 911 entered vassalage to the king of the West Franks Charles the Simple through the Treaty of St.-Claire-sur-Epte. In exchange for his homage and fealty, Rollo legally gained the territory he and his Viking allies had previously conquered. The name "Normandy" reflects Rollo's Viking (i.e. "Northman") origins.

The descendants of Rollo and his followers adopted the local Gallo-Romance language and intermarried with the area's inhabitants and became the Normans – a Norman French-speaking mixture of Scandinavians, Hiberno-Norse, Orcadians, Anglo-Danish, and indigenous Franks and Gauls.

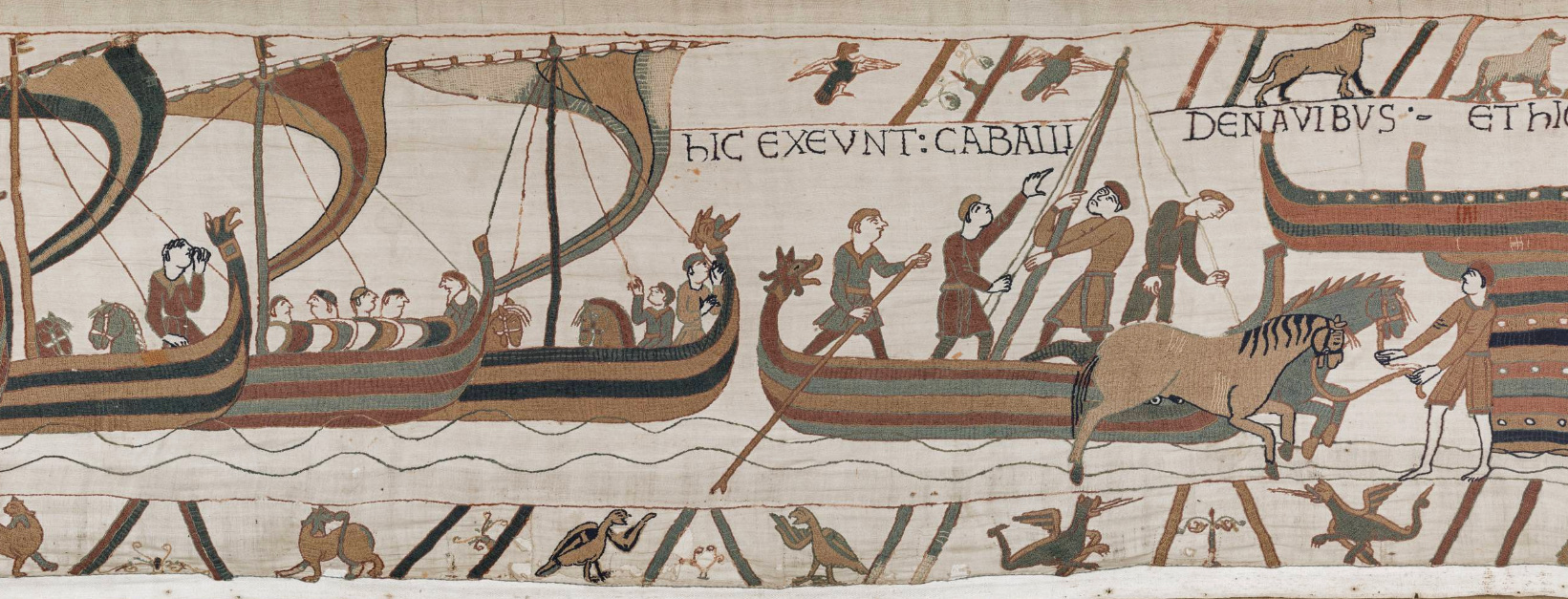
Landing in England scene from the Bayeux Tapestry, depicting ships coming in and horses landing

Rollo's descendant William, Duke of Normandy, became king of England in 1066 in the Norman Conquest beginning with the Battle of Hastings, while retaining the fiefdom of Normandy for himself and his descendants. In 1204, during the reign of King John, mainland Normandy was taken from England by France under Philip II, while insular Normandy (the Channel Islands) remained under English control. In 1259, Henry III of England recognised the legality of French possession of mainland Normandy under the Treaty of Paris. His successors, however, often fought to regain control of mainland Normandy.

With the rise of William the Conqueror, the North Sea and Channel began to lose some of their importance. The new order oriented most of England and Scandinavia's trade south, toward the Mediterranean and the Orient.

Although the British surrendered claims to mainland Normandy and other French possessions in 1801, the monarch of the United Kingdom retains the title Duke of Normandy in respect to the Channel Islands. The Channel Islands (except for Chausey) are Crown Dependencies of the British Crown. Thus the Loyal toast in the Channel Islands is Le roi, notre Duc ("The King, our Duke"). The British monarch is understood to not be the Duke of Normandy in regards of the French region of Normandy described herein, by virtue of the Treaty of Paris of 1259, the surrender of French possessions in 1801, and the belief that the rights of succession to that title are subject to Salic Law which excludes inheritance through female heirs.

French Normandy was occupied by English forces during the Hundred Years' War in 1346–1360 and again in 1415–1450.

=== England and Britain: Naval superpower ===
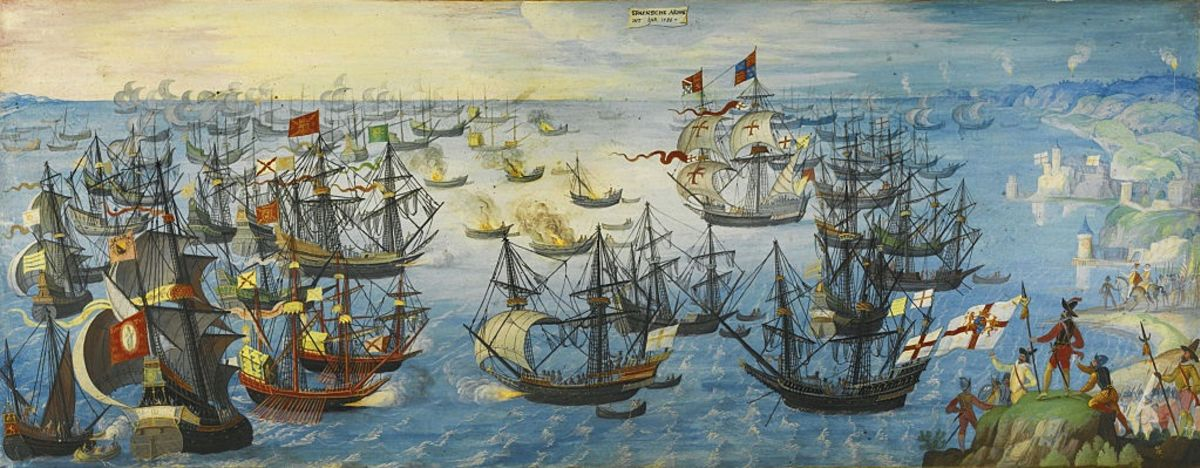
The Spanish Armada off the English coast in 1588

From the reign of Elizabeth I, English foreign policy concentrated on preventing invasion across the Channel by ensuring no major European power controlled the potential Dutch and Flemish invasion ports. Her climb to the pre-eminent sea power of the world began in 1588 as the attempted invasion of the Spanish Armada was defeated by the combination of outstanding naval tactics by the English and the Dutch under command of Charles Howard, 1st Earl of Nottingham with Sir Francis Drake second in command, and the following stormy weather. Over the centuries, the Royal Navy slowly grew to be the most powerful in the world.

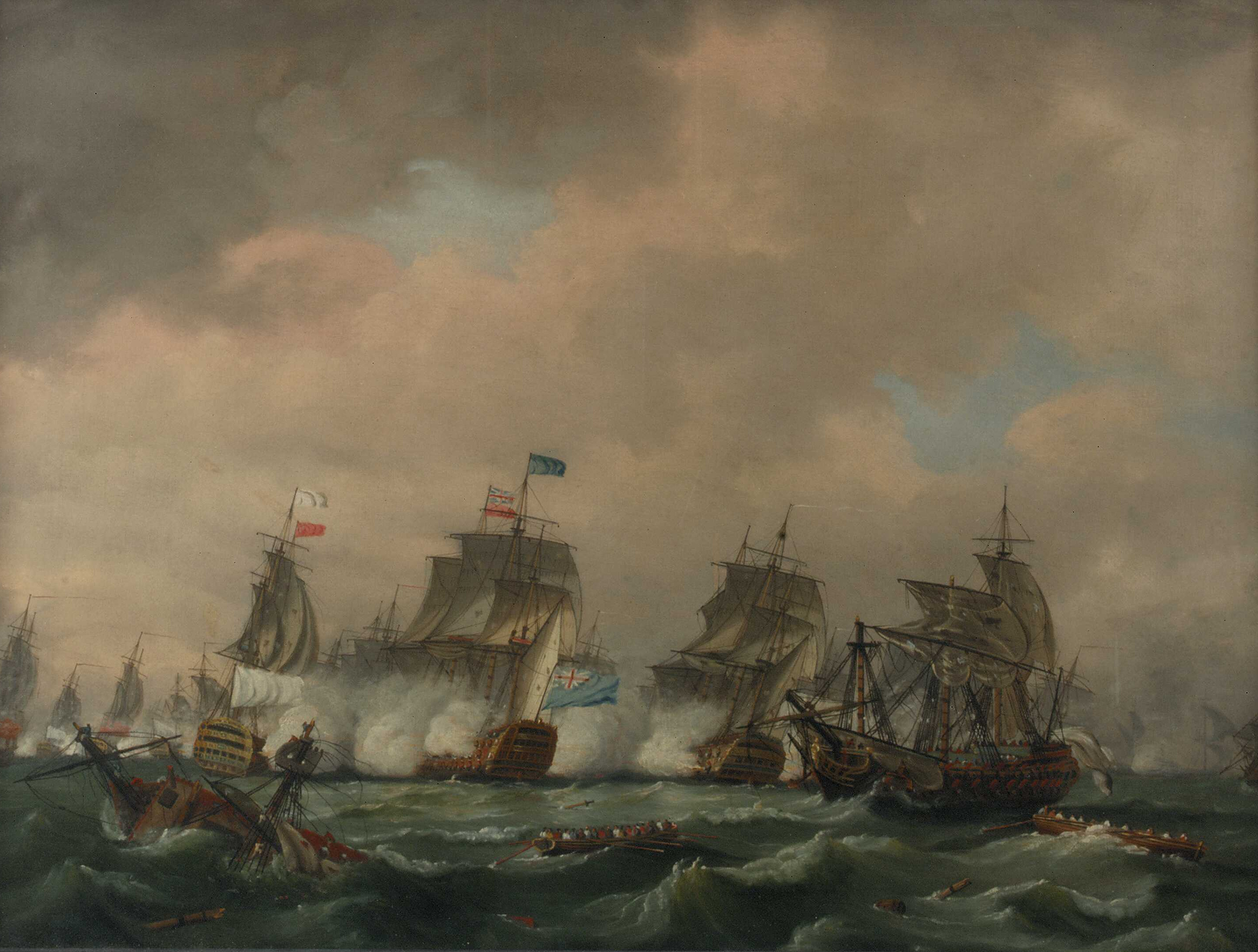
The Battle of Quiberon Bay which ended the French invasion plans in 1759

The building of the British Empire was possible only because the Royal Navy eventually managed to exercise unquestioned control over the seas around Europe, especially the Channel and the North Sea. During the Seven Years' War, France attempted to launch an invasion of Britain. To achieve this France needed to gain control of the Channel for several weeks, but was thwarted following the British naval victory at the Battle of Quiberon Bay in 1759 and was unsuccessful (The last French landing on English soil being in 1690 with a raid on Teignmouth, although the last French raid on British soil was a raid on Fishguard, Wales in 1797).

Another significant challenge to British domination of the seas came during the Napoleonic Wars. The Battle of Trafalgar took place off the coast of Spain against a combined French and Spanish fleet and was won by Admiral Horatio Nelson, ending Napoleon's plans for a cross-Channel invasion and securing British dominance of the seas for over a century.

=== First World War ===
The exceptional strategic importance of the Channel as a tool for blockading was recognised by the First Sea Lord Admiral Fisher in the years before World War I. "Five keys lock up the world! Singapore, the Cape, Alexandria, Gibraltar, Dover." However, on 25 July 1909 Louis Blériot made the first Channel crossing from Calais to Dover in an aeroplane. Blériot's crossing signalled a change in the function of the Channel as a barrier-moat for England against foreign enemies.

Because the Kaiserliche Marine surface fleet could not match the British Grand Fleet, the Germans developed submarine warfare, which was to become a far greater threat to Britain. The Dover Patrol, set up just before the war started, escorted cross-Channel troopships and prevented submarines from sailing in the Channel, obliging them to travel to the Atlantic via the much longer route around Scotland.

On land, the German army attempted to capture French Channel ports in the Race to the Sea but although the trenches are often said to have stretched "from the frontier of Switzerland to the English Channel", they reached the coast at the North Sea. Much of the British war effort in Flanders was a bloody but successful strategy to prevent the Germans reaching the Channel coast.

At the outset of the war, an attempt was made to block the path of U-boats through the Dover Strait with naval minefields. By February 1915, this had been augmented by a 25 kilometres (16 mi) stretch of light steel netting called the Dover Barrage, which it was hoped would ensnare submerged submarines. After initial success, the Germans learned how to pass through the barrage, aided by the unreliability of British mines. On 31 January 1917, the Germans resumed unrestricted submarine warfare leading to dire Admiralty predictions that submarines would defeat Britain by November, the most dangerous situation Britain faced in either world war.

The Battle of Passchendaele in 1917 was fought to reduce the threat by capturing the submarine bases on the Belgian coast, though it was the introduction of convoys and not capture of the bases that averted defeat. In April 1918 the Dover Patrol carried out the Zeebrugge Raid against the U-boat bases. During 1917, the Dover Barrage was re-sited with improved mines and more effective nets, aided by regular patrols by small warships equipped with powerful searchlights. A German attack on these vessels resulted in the Battle of Dover Strait in 1917. A much more ambitious attempt to improve the barrage, by installing eight massive concrete towers across the strait was called the Admiralty M-N Scheme but only two towers were nearing completion at the end of the war and the project was abandoned.

The naval blockade in the Channel and North Sea was one of the decisive factors in the German defeat in 1918.

=== Second World War ===
British radar facilities during the Battle of Britain 1940

During the Second World War, naval activity in the European theatre was primarily limited to the Atlantic. During the Battle of France in May 1940, the German forces succeeded in capturing both Boulogne and Calais, thereby threatening the line of retreat for the British Expeditionary Force. By a combination of hard fighting and German indecision, the port of Dunkirk was kept open allowing 338,000 Allied troops to be evacuated in Operation Dynamo. More than 11,000 were evacuated from Le Havre during Operation Cycle and a further 192,000 were evacuated from ports further down the coast in Operation Aerial in June 1940. The early stages of the Battle of Britain featured German air attacks on Channel shipping and ports; despite these early successes against shipping the Germans did not win the air supremacy necessary for Operation Sealion, the projected cross-Channel invasion.

The Channel subsequently became the stage for an intensive coastal war, featuring submarines, minesweepers, and Fast Attack Craft.

The narrow waters of the Channel were considered too dangerous for major warships until the Normandy Landings with the exception, for the German Kriegsmarine, of the Channel Dash (Operation Cerberus) in February 1942, and this required the support of the Luftwaffe in Operation Thunderbolt.

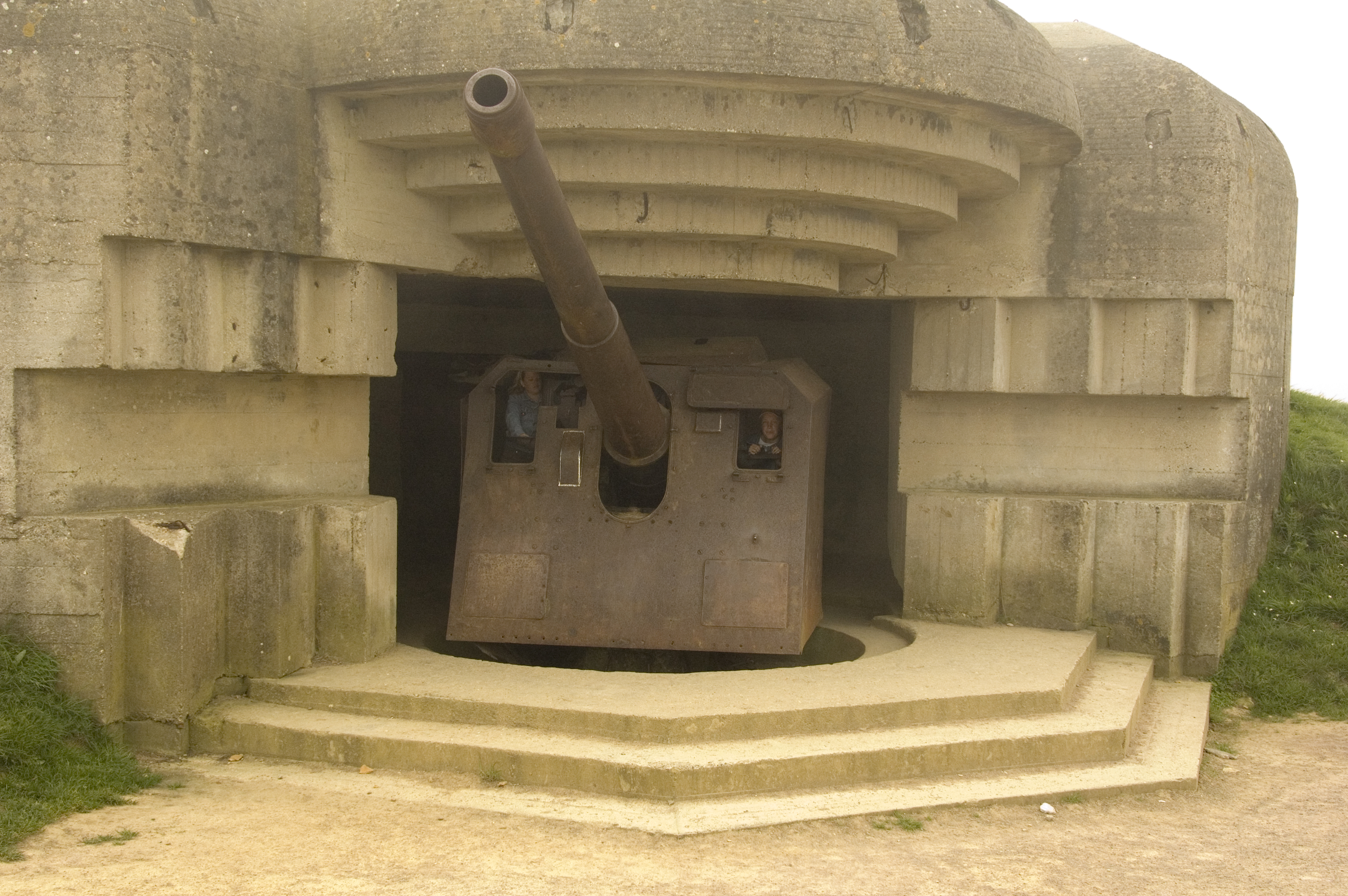
150 mm Second World War German gun emplacement in Normandy

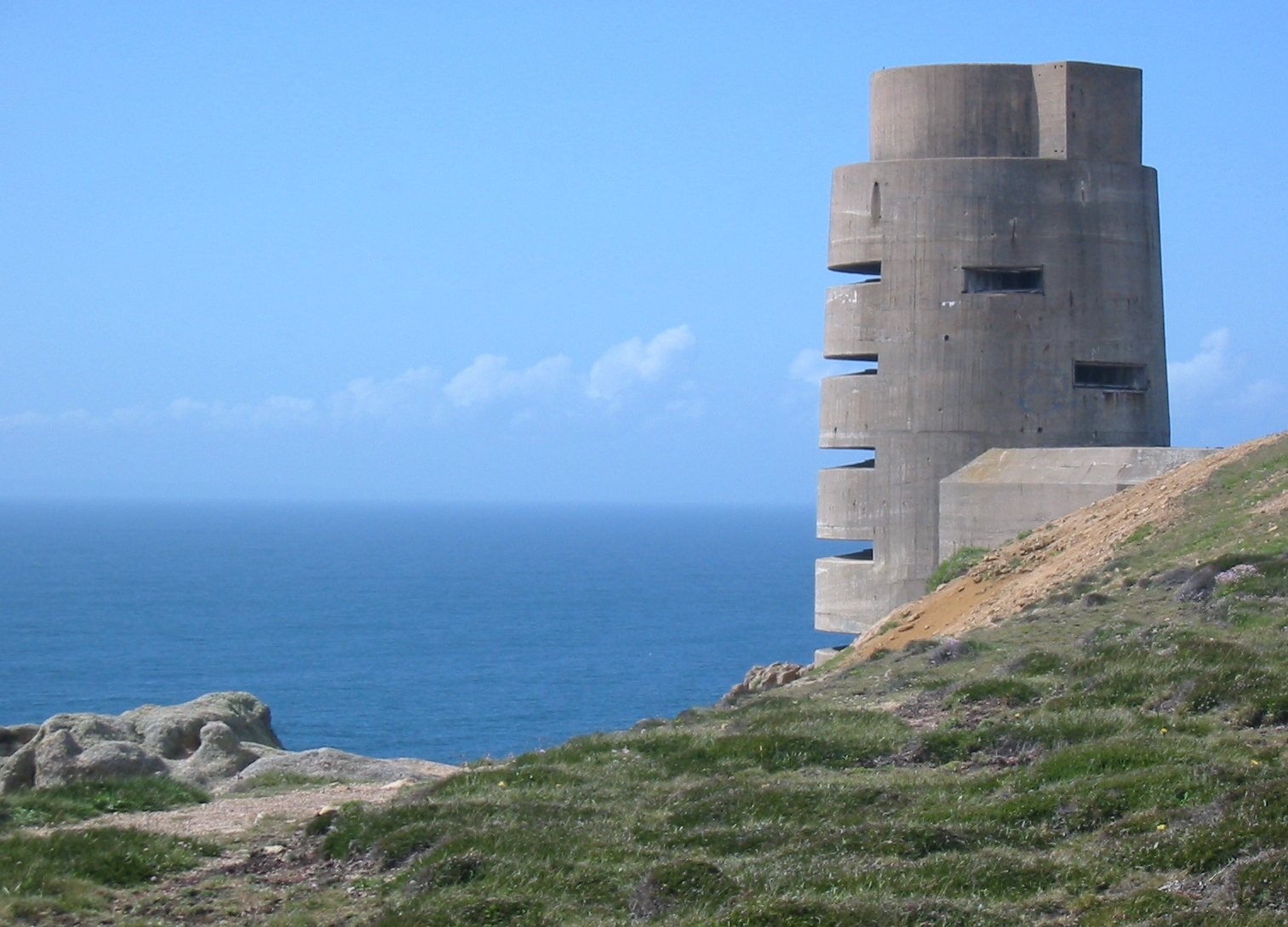
As part of the Atlantic Wall, between 1940 and 1945 the occupying German forces and the Organisation Todt constructed fortifications round the coasts of the Channel Islands, such as this observation tower at Les Landes, Jersey.

Dieppe was the site of an ill-fated Dieppe Raid by Canadian and British armed forces. More successful was the later Operation Overlord (D-Day), a massive invasion of German-occupied France by Allied troops. Caen, Cherbourg, Carentan, Falaise and other Norman towns endured many casualties in the fight for the province, which continued until the closing of the so-called Falaise gap between Chambois and Mont-Ormel, then liberation of Le Havre.

The Channel Islands were the only part of the British Commonwealth occupied by Germany (excepting the part of Egypt occupied by the Afrika Korps at the time of the Second Battle of El Alamein, which was a protectorate and not part of the Commonwealth). The German occupation of 1940–1945 was harsh, with some island residents being taken for slave labour on the Continent; native Jews sent to concentration camps; partisan resistance and retribution; accusations of collaboration; and slave labour (primarily Russians and eastern Europeans) being brought to the islands to build fortifications. The Royal Navy blockaded the islands from time to time, particularly following the liberation of mainland Normandy in 1944. Intense negotiations resulted in some Red Cross humanitarian aid, but there was considerable hunger and privation during the occupation, particularly in the final months, when the population was close to starvation. The German troops on the islands surrendered on 9 May 1945, a day after the final surrender in mainland Europe.

=== English Channel migrant crossings (2018–present) ===
Arrivals by month each year on small boats via the English Channel

There is significant public concern in the UK about refugees and migrants coming on small boats from France. Since 2018, the English Channel has seen a major increase in the number of crossings.

== Population ==
The English Channel coast is far more densely populated on the English shore. The most significant towns and cities along both the English and French sides of the Channel (each with more than 20,000 inhabitants, ranked in descending order; populations are the urban area populations from the 1999 French census, 2001 UK census, and 2001 Jersey census) are as follows:

England

- Brighton–Worthing–Littlehampton:
  461,181 inhabitants, made up of:
  - Brighton: 155,919
  - Worthing: 96,964
  - Hove: 72,335
  - Littlehampton: 55,716
  - Lancing–Sompting: 30,360
- Portsmouth: 442,252, including
  - Gosport: 79,200
- Bournemouth & Poole: 383,713
- Southampton: 304,400
- Plymouth: 258,700
- Torbay (Torquay): 129,702
- Hastings–Bexhill: 126,386
- Exeter: 119,600
- Eastbourne: 106,562
- Bognor Regis: 62,141
- Folkestone–Hythe: 60,039
- Weymouth: 56,043
- Dover: 39,078
- Walmer–Deal: 35,941
- Exmouth: 32,972
- Falmouth–Penryn: 28,801
- Ryde: 22,806
- St Austell: 22,658
- Seaford: 21,851
- Falmouth: 21,635
- Penzance: 20,255

France

- Le Havre: 248,547 inhabitants
- Calais: 104,852
- Saint-Malo: 50,675
- Lannion–Perros-Guirec: 48,990
- Saint-Brieuc: 45,879
- Boulogne-sur-Mer: 42,537
- Cherbourg: 77,789
- Dieppe: 42,202
- Morlaix: 35,996
- Dinard: 25,006
- Étaples–Le Touquet-Paris-Plage: 23,994
- Fécamp: 22,717
- Eu–Le Tréport: 22,019
- Trouville-sur-Mer–Deauville: 20,406

Channel Islands

- Saint Helier, Jersey: 28,310 inhabitants
- Saint Peter Port, Guernsey: 16,488 inhabitants
- Saint Anne, Alderney: 2,200 inhabitants
- Sark: 600 inhabitants
- Herm: 60 inhabitants

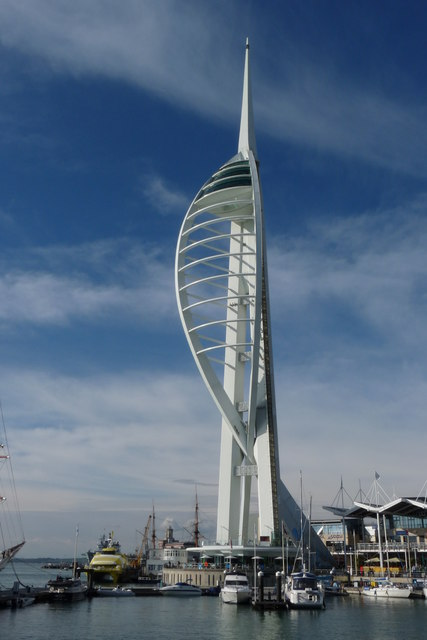
The Spinnaker (observation) Tower, Portsmouth Harbour

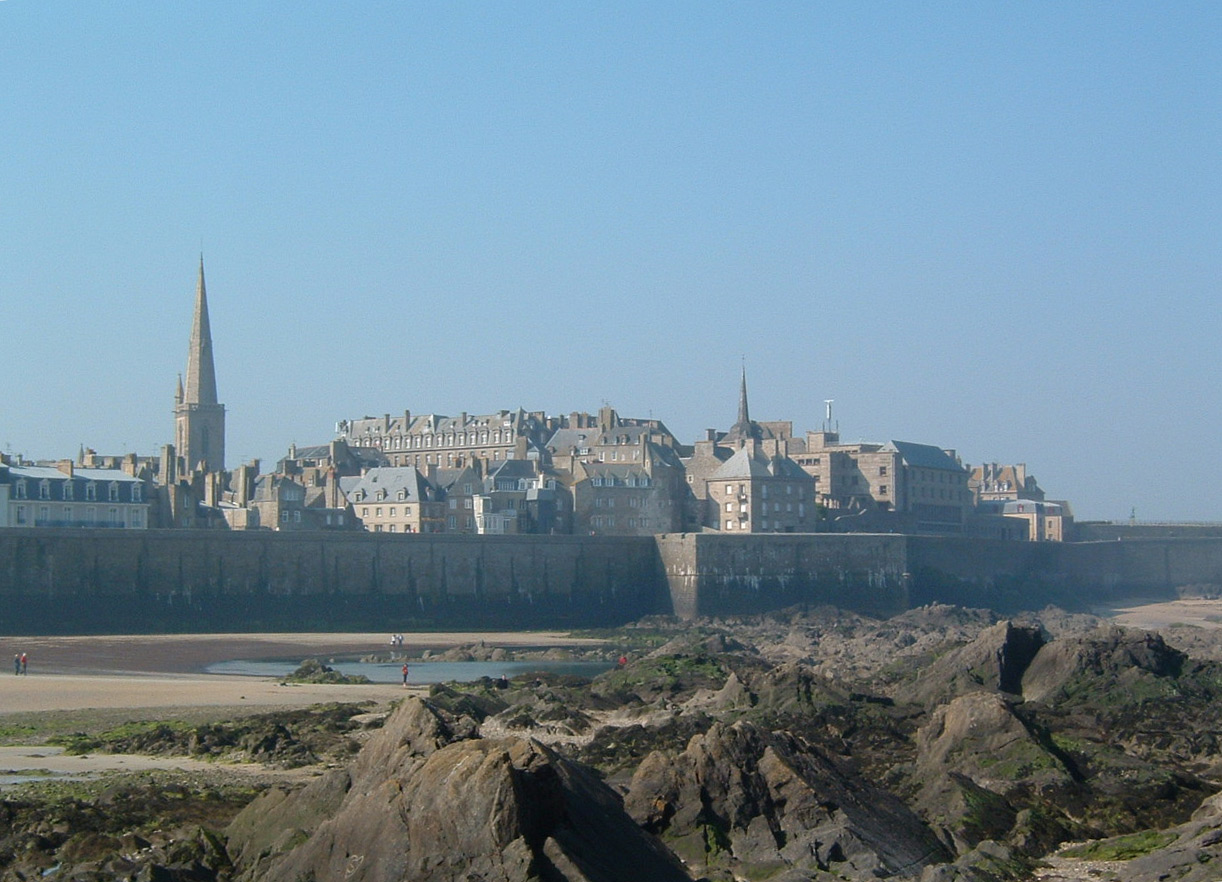
The walled city of Saint-Malo was a stronghold of corsairs.

== Culture and languages ==
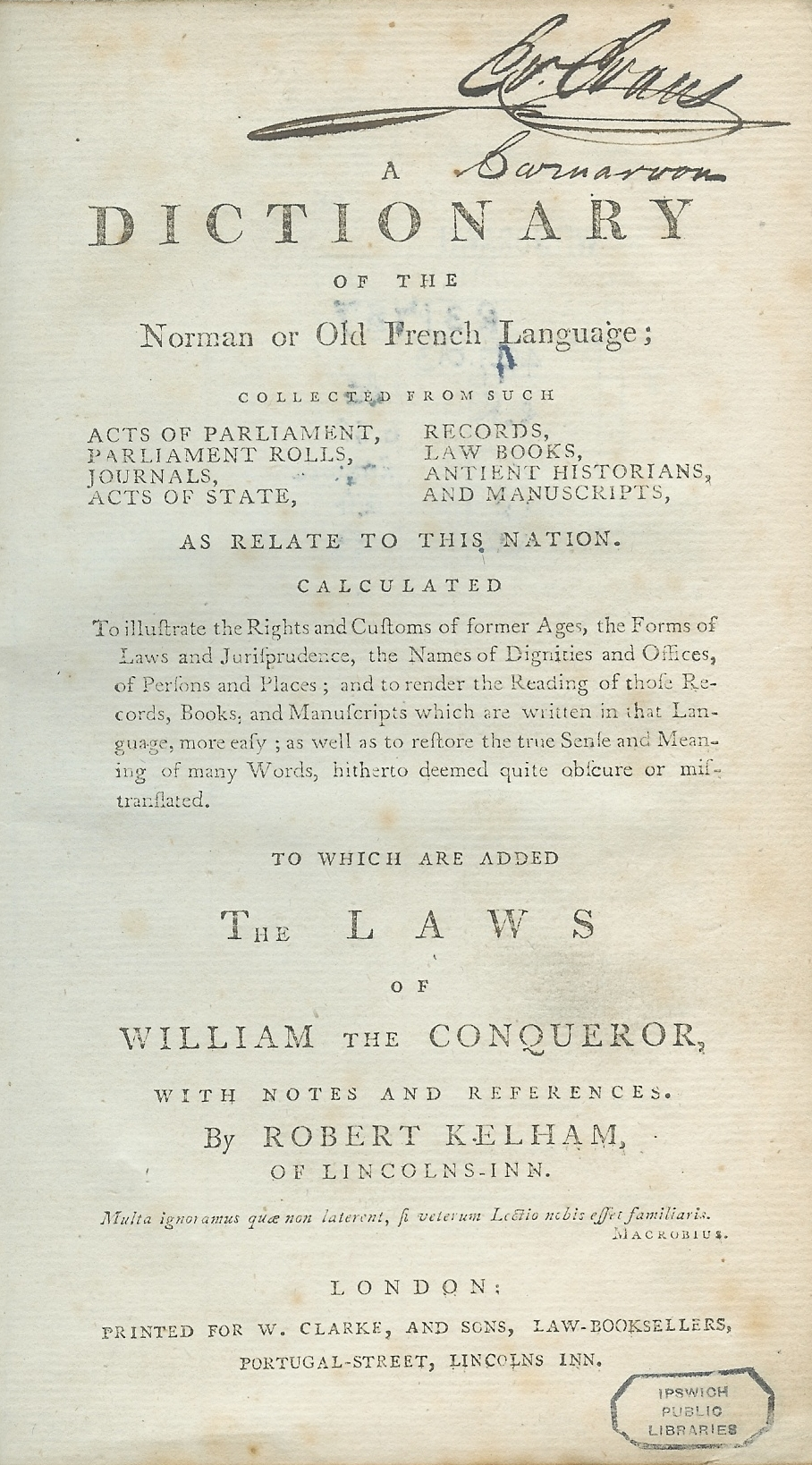
Kelham's Dictionary of the Norman or Old French Language (1779), defining Law French, a language historically used in English law courts

The two dominant cultures are English on the north shore of the Channel, French on the south. However, there are also a number of minority languages that are or were found on the shores and islands of the English Channel, which are listed here, with the Channel's name in the specific language following them.

Celtic languages
Breton: Mor Breizh, Sea of Brittany
Cornish: Mor Bretennek, British Sea
Irish: Muir nIocht, Merciful Sea
Germanic languages
English
Dutch: het Kanaal, the Channel. (Dutch previously had a larger range, and extended into parts of modern-day France as French Flemish.)
Romance languages
French: La Manche
Gallo: Manche, Grand-Mè, Mè Bertone
Norman, including the Channel Island vernaculars:
- Anglo-Norman (extinct, but fossilised in certain English law phrases)
- Auregnais (extinct)
- Cotentinais: Maunche
- Guernésiais: Ch'nal
- Jèrriais: Ch'na
- Sercquais
Picard

Most other languages tend towards variants of the French and English forms, but notably Welsh has Môr Udd.

== Economy ==
=== Shipping ===
The Channel has traffic on both the UK–Europe and North Sea–Atlantic routes, and is the world's busiest seaway, with over 500 ships per day. Following an accident in January 1971 and a series of disastrous collisions with wreckage in February, the Dover TSS, the world's first radar-controlled traffic separation scheme, was set up by the International Maritime Organization. The scheme mandates that vessels travelling north must use the French side, travelling south the English side. There is a separation zone between the two lanes.

In December 2002 the MV Tricolor, carrying £30m of luxury cars, sank 32 km (20 mi) northwest of Dunkirk after collision in fog with the container ship Kariba. The cargo ship Nicola ran into the wreckage the next day. There was no loss of life.

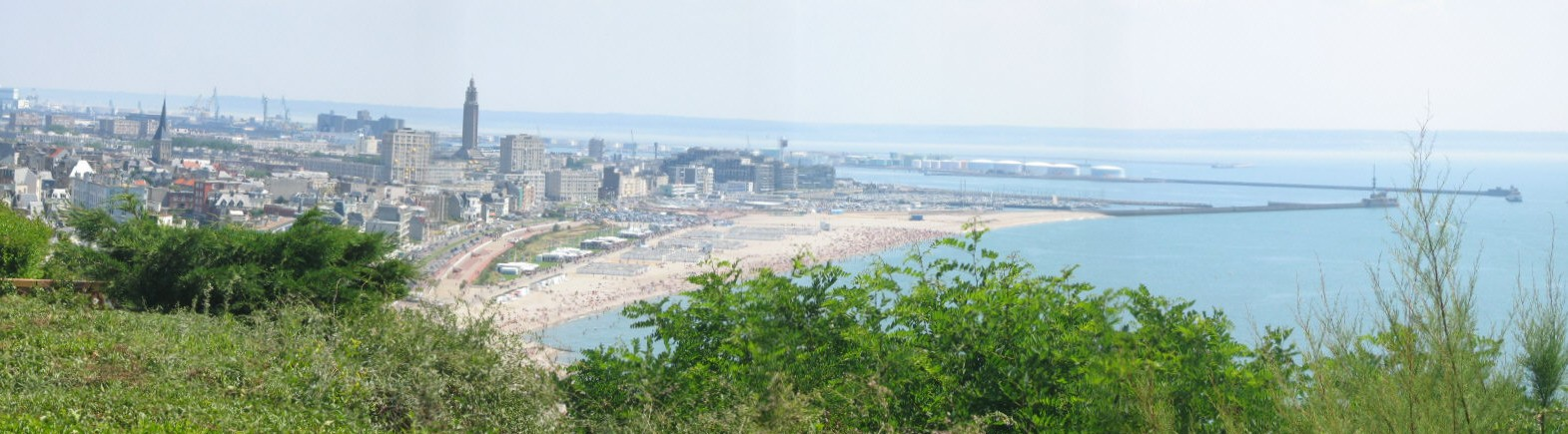
The beach of Le Havre and a part of the rebuilt city

The shore-based long-range traffic control system was updated in 2003 and there is a series of traffic separation schemes in operation. Though the system is inherently incapable of reaching the levels of safety obtained from aviation systems such as the traffic collision avoidance system, it has reduced accidents to one or two per year.

Marine GPS systems allow ships to be preprogrammed to follow navigational channels accurately and automatically, further avoiding risk of running aground, but following the fatal collision between Dutch Aquamarine and Ash in October 2001, Britain's Marine Accident Investigation Branch (MAIB) issued a safety bulletin saying it believed that in these most unusual circumstances GPS use had actually contributed to the collision. The ships were maintaining a very precise automated course, one directly behind the other, rather than making use of the full width of the traffic lanes as a human navigator would.

A combination of radar difficulties in monitoring areas near cliffs, a failure of a CCTV system, incorrect operation of the anchor, the inability of the crew to follow standard procedures of using a GPS to provide early warning of the ship dragging the anchor and reluctance to admit the mistake and start the engine led to the MV Willy running aground in Cawsand Bay, Cornwall, in January 2002. The MAIB report makes it clear that the harbour controllers were informed of impending disaster by shore observers before the crew were themselves aware. The village of Kingsand was evacuated for three days because of the risk of explosion, and the ship was stranded for 11 days.

=== Ferry ===
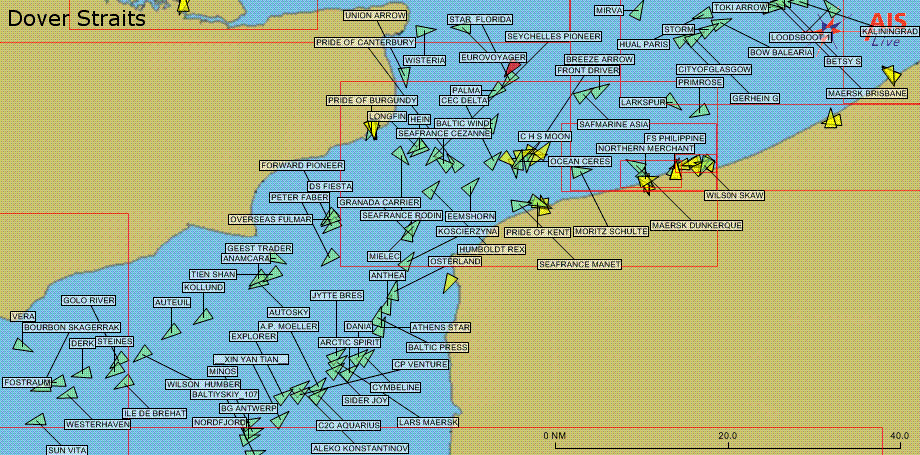
Automatic identification system display showing traffic in the Channel in 2006

The ferry routes crossing the English Channel, include (have included):-

- Dover–Calais
- Dover–Dunkirk
- Newhaven–Dieppe
- Plymouth–Roscoff
- Poole–Cherbourg
- Poole–Jersey and Guernsey
- Poole–Saint Malo
- Portsmouth–Cherbourg
- Portsmouth–Jersey and Guernsey
- Portsmouth–Le Havre
- Portsmouth–Ouistreham
- Portsmouth–Saint Malo
- Rosslare–Cherbourg
- Rosslare–Roscoff
- Weymouth–Saint Malo
- Brighton Marina to Dieppe (using the SeaJet for a 100-minute crossing)

=== Channel Tunnel ===
Many travellers cross beneath the Channel using the Channel Tunnel, first proposed in the early 19th century and finally opened in 1994, connecting the UK and France by rail. It is now routine to travel between Paris or Brussels and London on the Eurostar train. Freight trains also use the tunnel. Cars, coaches and lorries are carried on Eurotunnel Shuttle trains between Folkestone and Calais.

=== Tourism ===
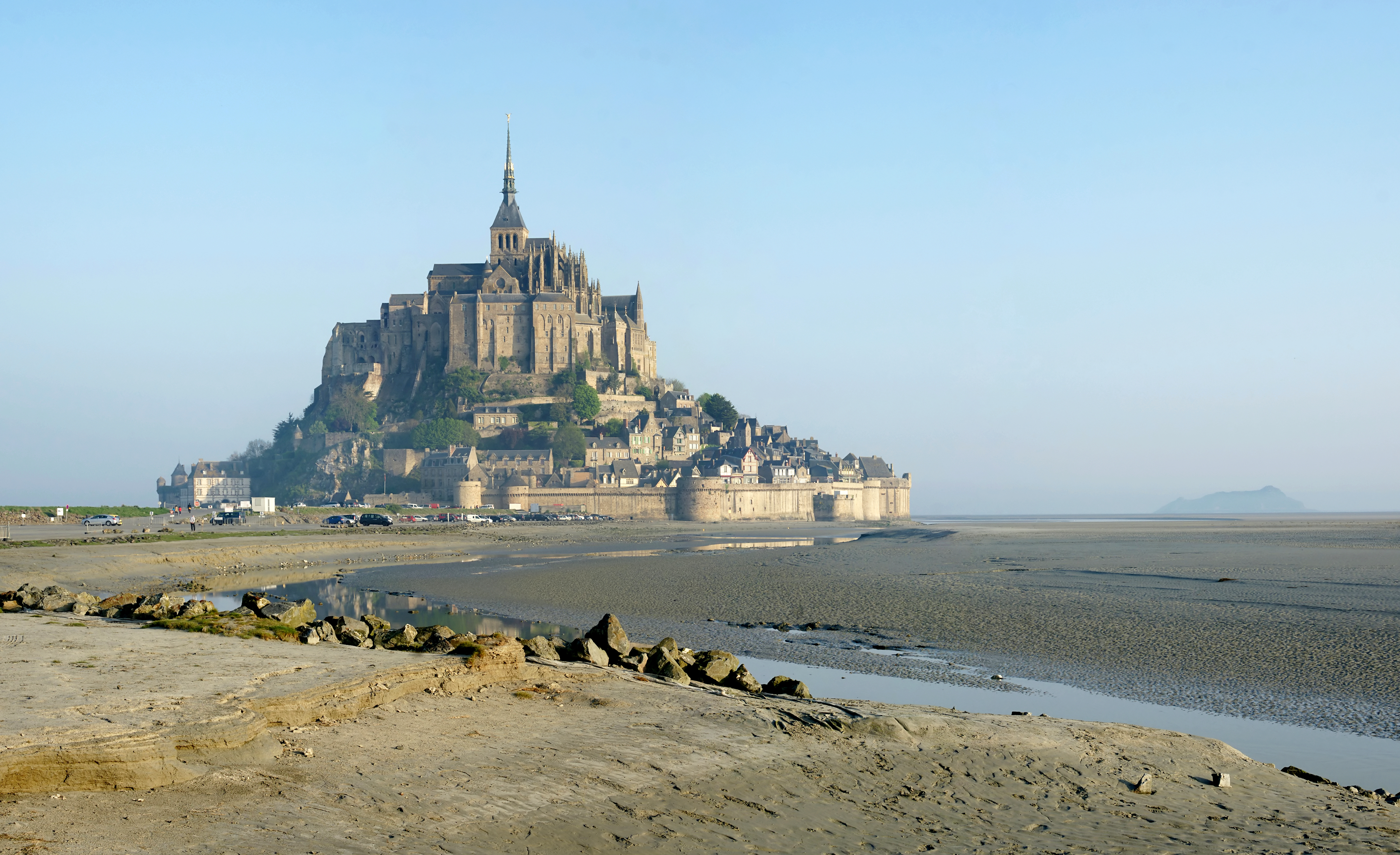
The Mont Saint-Michel is one of the most visited and recognisable landmarks on the English Channel.

The coastal resorts of the Channel, such as Brighton and Deauville, inaugurated an era of aristocratic tourism in the early 19th century. Short trips across the Channel for leisure purposes are often referred to as Channel hopping.

=== Renewable energy ===
The Rampion Wind Farm is an offshore wind farm located in the Channel, off the coast of West Sussex. Other offshore wind farms planned on the French side of the Channel.

== History of Channel crossings ==
As one of the narrowest and most well-known international waterways lacking dangerous currents, the Channel has been the first objective of numerous innovative sea, air, and human powered crossing technologies. Pre-historic people sailed from the mainland to England for millennia. At the end of the last Ice Age, lower sea levels even permitted walking across.

=== By boat ===
Date	Crossing	Participant(s)	Notes
March 1816	The French paddle steamer Élise (ex Scottish-built Margery or Margory) was the first steamer to cross the Channel.		
9 May 1816	Paddle steamer Defiance, Captain William Wager, was the first steamer to cross the Channel to Holland		
10 June 1821	Paddle steamer Rob Roy, first passenger ferry to cross channel		The steamer was purchased subsequently by the French postal administration and renamed Henri IV.
June 1843	First ferry connection through Folkestone-Boulogne		Commanding officer Captain Hayward
17 March 1864	Race between a twin-screw steamer and a paddle steamer carrying mail. This race proved the superiority of screw over paddle.	The Atalanta Twin-Screw Steamer and the Dover Mail-Packet Empress	The Atalanta newly built by Messrs. J. and W. Dudgeon, of Cubitt Town Yard, Millwall, made the trip from to Dover to Calais in 77 minutes; the Empress, owned by the London, Chatham, and Dover Railway Company took 107 minutes.
25 July 1959	Hovercraft crossing (Calais to Dover, 2 hours 3 minutes)	SR-N1	Sir Christopher Cockerell was on board
1960s	First crossing by water ski.	The Varne Boat Club ran an annual cross-channel ski race from the 1960s onwards. The race was from the Varne club in Greatstone on Sea to Cap Gris Nez / Boulogne (latter years) and back. Many waterskiers have made this return crossing non-stop since this time. Youngest known waterskier to cross the Channel was John Clements aged 10, from the Varne Boat Club on 22 August 1974 who crossed from Littlestone to Boulogne and back without falling.	
22 August 1972	First solo hovercraft crossing (same route as SR-N1; 2 hours 20 minutes)	Nigel Beale (UK)	
1974	Coracle (13 and a half hours)	Bernard Thomas (UK)	As part of a publicity stunt, the journey was undertaken to demonstrate how the Bull Boats of the Mandan Indians of North Dakota could have been copied from Welsh coracles introduced by Prince Madog in the 12th century.
August 1984	First crossing by pedalo (8hrs 6mins)	Ric and Steve Cooper (UK)	Charity event organized by Littlehampton Rotaract to raise funds for Leukaemia Research, the RNLI, and other charities in memory of Angie Jones.
14 September 1995	Fastest crossing by hovercraft, 22 minutes by Princess Anne	MCH SR-N4 MkIII	Craft was designed as a ferry
1997	First vessel to complete a solar-powered crossing using photovoltaic cells	SB Collinda	—
14 June 2004	New record time for crossing in amphibious vehicle (the Gibbs Aquada, three-seater open-top sports car)	Richard Branson (UK)	Completed crossing in 1 hour 40 minutes 6 seconds – previous record was 6 hours.
26 July 2006	New record time for crossing in hydrofoil car (the Rinspeed Splash, two-seater open-top sports car)	Frank M. Rinderknecht (Switzerland)	Completed crossing in 3 hours 14 minutes
25 September 2006	First crossing on a towed inflatable object (not a powered inflatable boat)	Stephen Preston (UK)	Completed crossing in 180 min
July 2007	BBC Top Gear presenters "drive" to France in amphibious cars	Jeremy Clarkson, Richard Hammond, James May (UK)	Completed the crossing in a 1996 Nissan D21 pick-up (the "Nissank"), fitted with a Honda outboard engine.
20 August 2011	First crossing by diver propulsion vehicle (sea scooters)	A four-man relay team from Scarborough, headed by Heath Samples, crossed from Shakespeare Beach to Wissant.	It took 12 hours 26 minutes 39 seconds and set a new Guinness World Record.

Pierre Andriel crossed the English Channel aboard the Élise, ex the Scottish p.s. "Margery" in March 1816, one of the earliest seagoing voyages by steam ship.

The paddle steamer Defiance, Captain William Wager, was the first steamer to cross the Channel to Holland, arriving there on 9 May 1816.

On 10 June 1821, English-built paddle steamer Rob Roy was the first passenger ferry to cross channel. The steamer was purchased subsequently by the French postal administration and renamed Henri IV and put into regular passenger service a year later. It was able to make the journey across the Straits of Dover in around three hours.

In June 1843, because of difficulties with Dover harbour, the South Eastern Railway company developed the Boulogne-sur-Mer-Folkestone route as an alternative to Calais-Dover. The first ferry crossed under the command of Captain Hayward.

In 1974 a Welsh coracle piloted by Bernard Thomas of Llechryd crossed the English Channel to France in 13 1/2 hours. The journey was undertaken to demonstrate how the Bull Boats of the Mandan Indians of North Dakota could have been copied from coracles introduced by Prince Madog in the 12th century.

The Mountbatten class hovercraft (MCH) entered commercial service in August 1968, initially between Dover and Boulogne but later also Ramsgate (Pegwell Bay) to Calais. The journey time Dover to Boulogne was roughly 35 minutes, with six trips per day at peak times. The fastest crossing of the English Channel by a commercial car-carrying hovercraft was 22 minutes, recorded by the Princess Anne MCH SR-N4 Mk3 on 14 September 1995,

=== By air ===
The first aircraft to cross the Channel was a balloon in 1785, piloted by Jean Pierre François Blanchard (France) and John Jeffries (US).

Louis Blériot (France) piloted the first aeroplane to cross in 1909.

On 26 September 2008, Swiss Yves Rossy, also known as Jetman, became the first person to cross the English Channel with a jet-powered wingsuit, jumping from a Pilatus Porter airplane over Calais, France, crossing the English Channel and deploying his parachute and landing in Dover

The first flying car to have crossed the English Channel is a Pégase designed by the French company Vaylon on 14 June 2017. It was piloted by a Franco-Italian pilot Bruno Vezzoli. This crossing was carried out as part of the first road and air trip from Paris to London in a flying car. Pegase is a two-seater road-approved dune buggy and powered paraglider. The take-off was at 8:03 a.m. from Ambleteuse in the North of France and landing was at East Studdal, near Dover. The flight was completed in 1 hour and 15 minutes for a total distance covered of 72.5 km (45.0 mi), including 33.3 km (20.7 mi) over the English Channel at an altitude of 1,240 metres (4,070 ft) .

On 12 June 1979, the first human-powered aircraft to cross the English Channel was the Gossamer Albatross, built by American aeronautical engineer Dr. Paul B. MacCready's company AeroVironment, and piloted by Bryan Allen. The 35.7 km (22.2 mi) crossing was completed in 2 hours and 49 minutes.

On 4 August 2019, Frenchman Franky Zapata became the first person to cross the English Channel on a jet-powered Flyboard Air. The board was powered by a kerosene-filled backpack. Zapata made the 35.4 km (22.0 mi) journey in 22 minutes, having landed on a boat half-way across to refuel.

=== By swimming ===
The sport of Channel swimming traces its origins to the latter part of the 19th century when Captain Matthew Webb made the first observed and unassisted swim across the Strait of Dover, swimming from England to France on 24–25 August 1875 in 21 hours 45 minutes.

Up to 1927, fewer than ten swimmers (including the first woman, Gertrude Ederle in 1926) had managed to successfully swim the English Channel, and many dubious claims had been made. The Channel Swimming Association (CSA) was founded to authenticate and ratify swimmers' claims to have swum the Channel and to verify crossing times. The CSA was dissolved in 1999 and was succeeded by two separate organisations: CSA Ltd (CSA) and the Channel Swimming and Piloting Federation (CSPF), both observe and authenticate cross-Channel swims in the Strait of Dover. The Channel Crossing Association was also set up to cater for unorthodox crossings.

The team with the most Channel swims to its credit is the Serpentine Swimming Club in London, followed by the international Sri Chinmoy Marathon Team.

As of 2023, 1,881 people had completed 2,428 verified solo crossings under the rules of the CSA and the CSPF. This includes 24 two-way crossings and three three-way crossings.

As the Channel has been the busiest ocean shipping lane in the world for some time, it is governed by International Law as described in Unorthodox Crossing of the Dover Strait Traffic Separation Scheme. It states: "[In] exceptional cases the French Maritime Authorities may grant authority for unorthodox craft to cross French territorial waters within the Traffic Separation Scheme when these craft set off from the British coast, on condition that the request for authorisation is sent to them with the opinion of the British Maritime Authorities."

The fastest verified swim of the Channel was by the Australian Trent Grimsey on 8 September 2012, in 6 hours 55 minutes, beating a swim of 2007. The female record is held by Yvetta Hlavacova of Czechia, on 7 hours, 25 minutes on 5 August 2006. Both records were from England to France.

There may have been some unreported swims of the Channel, by people intent on entering Britain in circumvention of immigration controls. A failed attempt to cross the Channel by two Syrian refugees in October 2014 came to light when their bodies were discovered on the shores of the North Sea in Norway and the Netherlands.

=== By car ===
On 16 September 1965, two Amphicars crossed from Dover to Calais.

=== Other types ===
Date	Crossing	Participant(s)	Notes
17 October 1851	First submarine cable for telegraph across the Channel in September laid from St. Margaret's Bay, England to Sangatte, France (commonly referred to as the Dover to Calais cable)	Thomas Russell Crampton (engineer), financed by Charlton James Wollaston in a private partnership with others, entitled "Wollaston et Compagnie".	The first international submarine cable in the world, in use until 1859. 21 nautical miles distance needed 24 + 1 n. miles of cable spliced.
27 March 1899	First radio transmission across the Channel (from Wimereux to South Foreland Lighthouse)	Guglielmo Marconi (Italy)	

PLUTO was a war-time fuel delivery project of "pipelines under the ocean" from England to France. Though plagued with technical difficulties during the Battle of Normandy, the pipelines delivered about 8% of the fuel requirements of the Allied forces between D-Day and VE-Day.

== See also ==
- English Channel migrant crossings (2018–present)
- France–UK border
- Anguilla Channel
- Booze cruise
- Guadeloupe Passage
- Invasions of the British Isles
- List of firsts in aviation
- Phoenix breakwaters
