= Architecture of Normandy =

See also the Romanesque architecture erected by the Normans at Norman architecture.

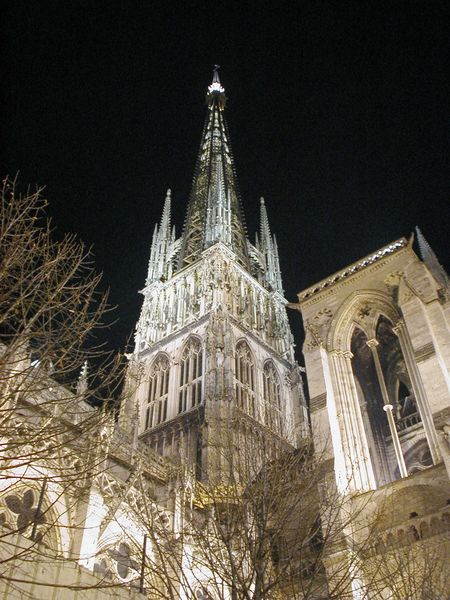
Rouen Cathedral, an example of Gothic architecture in Normandy

The architecture of Normandy spans a thousand years.

== Vernacular domestic styles ==
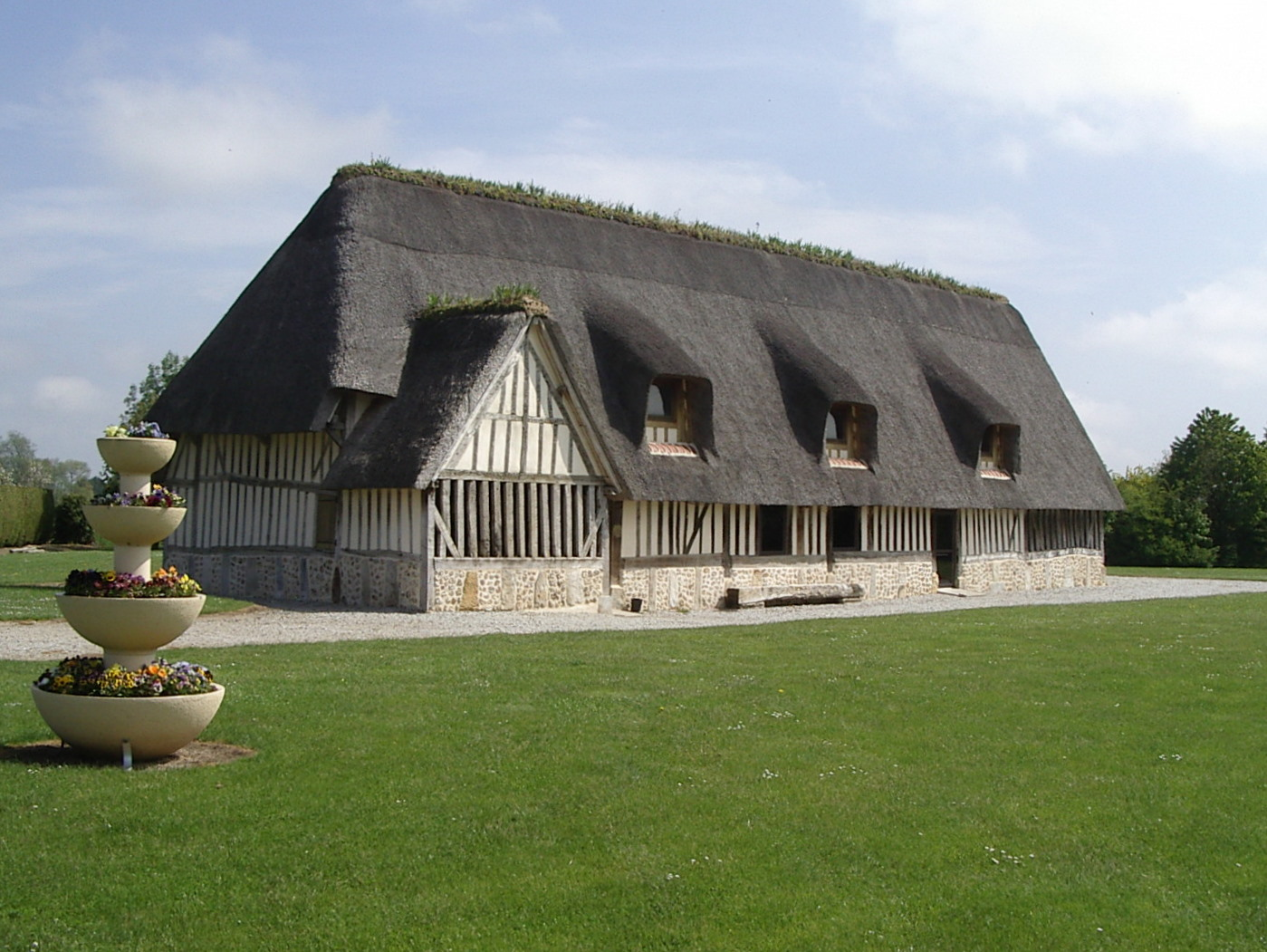
Former presshouse in pays d'Ouche

In Upper Normandy and in the pays d'Auge, Mortainais, Passais and Avranchin (Lower Normandy), the vernacular domestic architecture is typically half-timbered and thatched.

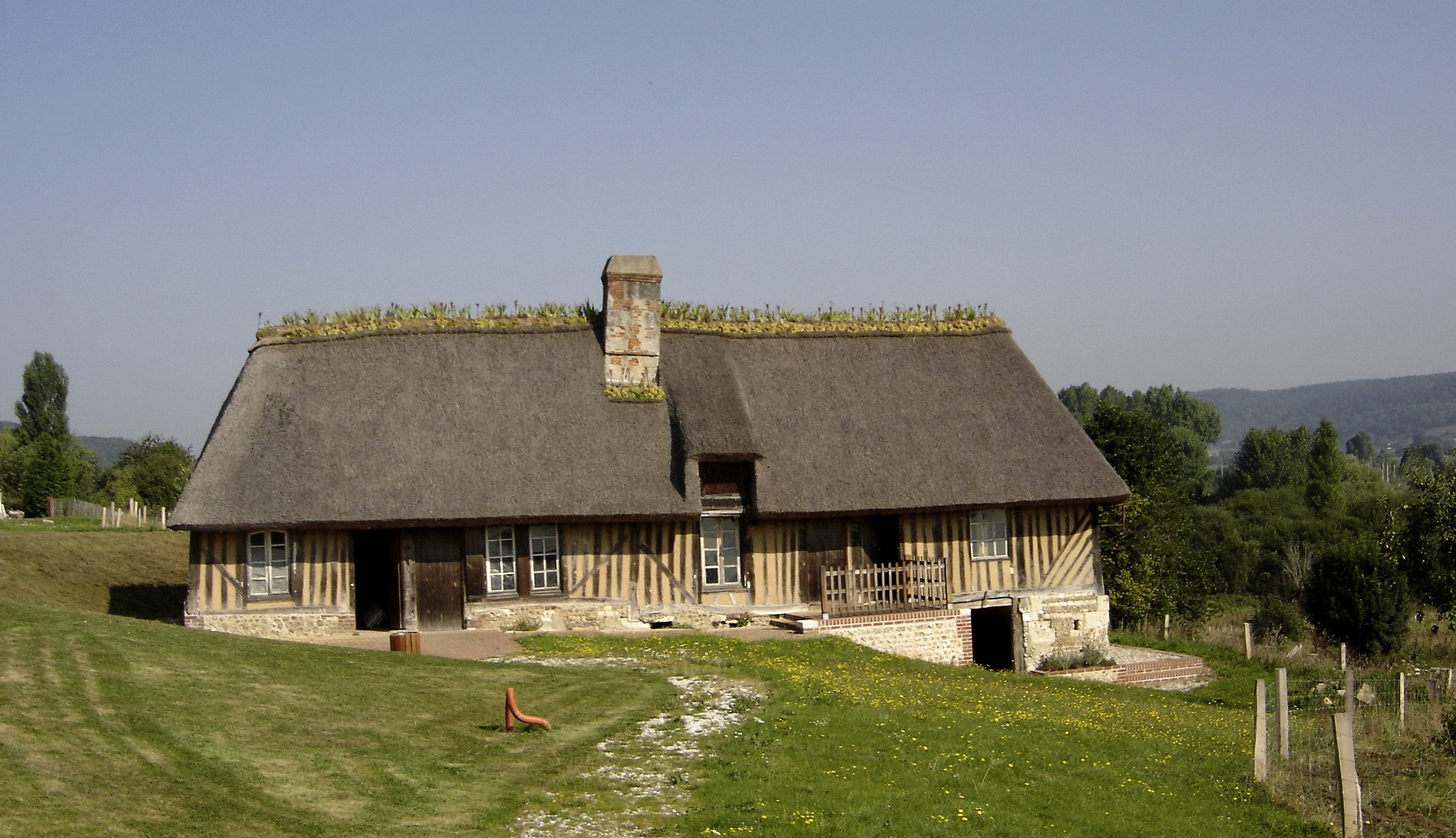
Vernacular half-timbered thatched cottage in Lieuvin

The half-timbered farmhouses scattered across the countryside are inherited from an older tradition that has its roots in the Celtic farms, the remains of which have been excavated by archeologists. A particular style of farmstead called clos masure or cour-masure developed in the Pays de Caux as a result of the harsher landscape of that area and local tradition, which has been influenced by English and Danish styles.

Brick and flintstone were later used to build or rebuild some of the cottages and public buildings, such as town halls. Some villages of the pays de Caux and the Pays de Bray were entirely rebuilt this way.

The other parts of Lower Normandy, especially the Cotentin Peninsula, tends to use granite as the predominant local building material. The Channel Islands also share this influence – Chausey was for many years a source of quarried granite, including stone for the construction of Mont Saint-Michel. The Caen plain and the area of Bessin use the traditional unusually hard limestone, called Caen stone.

== Urban vernacular style ==
Like almost everywhere in France, the oldest houses in the main cities are half-timbered, but there are more widespread in Haute-Normandie and there are more recent examples.

The urban architectural heritage of mainland Normandy was badly damaged during the Battle of Normandy in 1944. Many historic urban centres were destroyed, notably in Caen, Rouen, Lisieux and perhaps most tragically in Valognes, once known as the "Versailles of Normandy" for its aristocratic mansions and palaces. Massive post-war urban reconstruction in the 1950s and 1960s, such as in Le Havre and Saint-Lô, has left modernist interventions.

== Castles and manors in Normandy ==
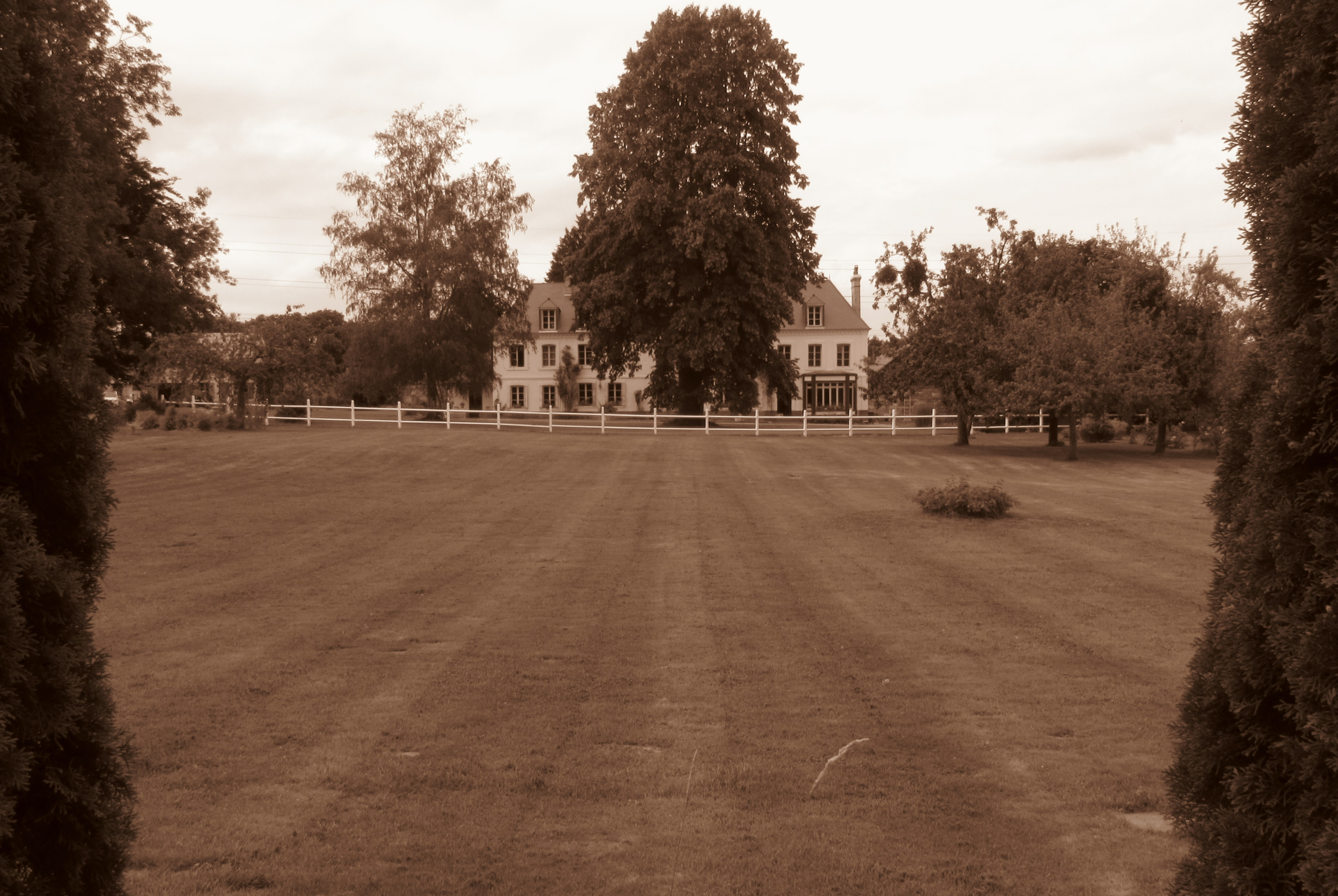
Manoir du Clap

A distinctive feature of Normandy is its large number of castles and manors. The region was significantly influenced by the presence of English administration and military forces before and during the Hundred Years' War. The religious wars also contributed to the architectural style typical of the region. From the Late Middle Ages to the Renaissance, Normandy's architecture evolved under English influence, resulting in the proliferation of manors. In France such buildings can only be found in Normandy and Brittany; they were introduced by the English administration during the reign of the Plantagenets. The Manoir du Catel and the Manoir du Clap exemplify this type of building.

From the 17th century to the late 19th century, Normandy experienced considerable prosperity, prompting many noble families to erect castles. These castles, no longer serving defensive purposes, became symbols of wealth and status. The Château de Bosmelet is a notable example of such a château.

== Ecclesiastical architecture ==
The confident church architecture such as at Lessay and Bayeux has left its mark on the landscape, as well as an artistic legacy in literature and in art, for example Claude Monet's series of Impressionist paintings of the Rouen Cathedral's Gothic facade.

- Abbey of Jumièges, near Rouen (ruins)
- Abbey of Mont Saint-Michel, Normandy (continued in Gothic style)
- Abbey of Bec
- Two abbeys at Caen founded by William the Conqueror

== Fin de siècle architecture in Normandy ==
The south part of Bagnoles-de-l'Orne, which is called Belle Époque district is filled with superb bourgeois villas with polychrome façades, bow windows and unique roofing. This area, built between 1886 and 1914, has an authentic "Bagnolese" style and is typical of high-society country vacation of the time.

== Gallery ==
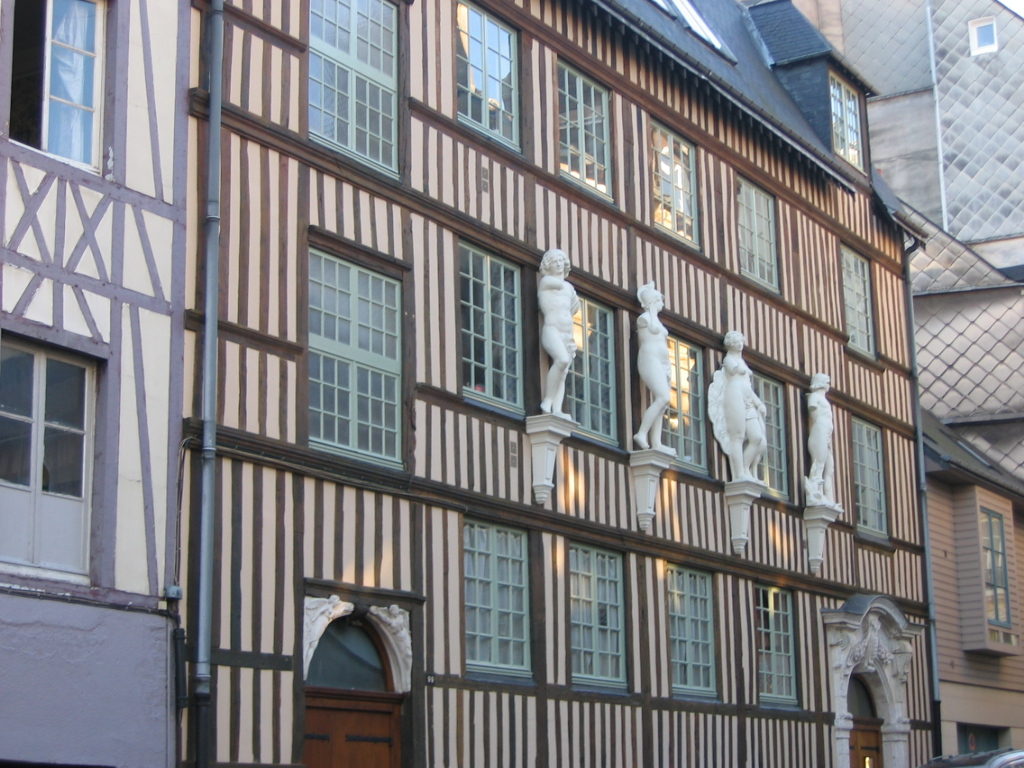

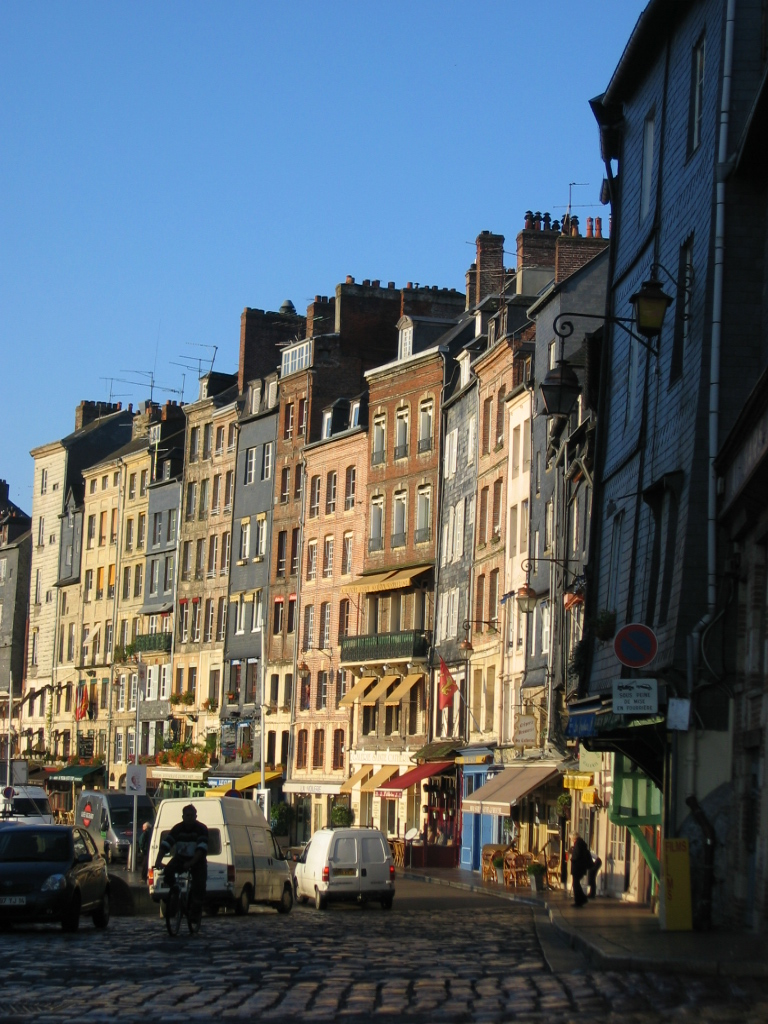

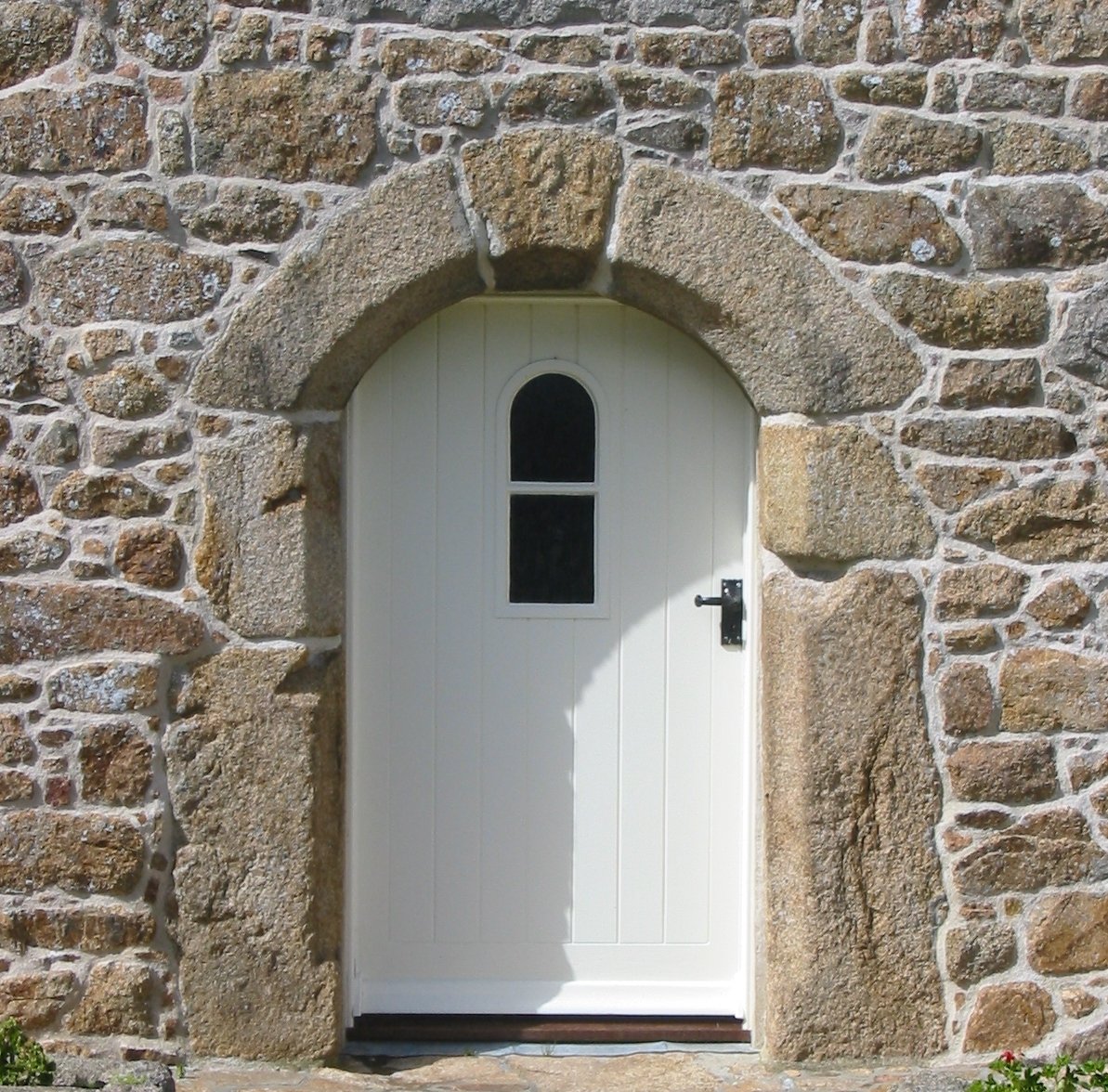

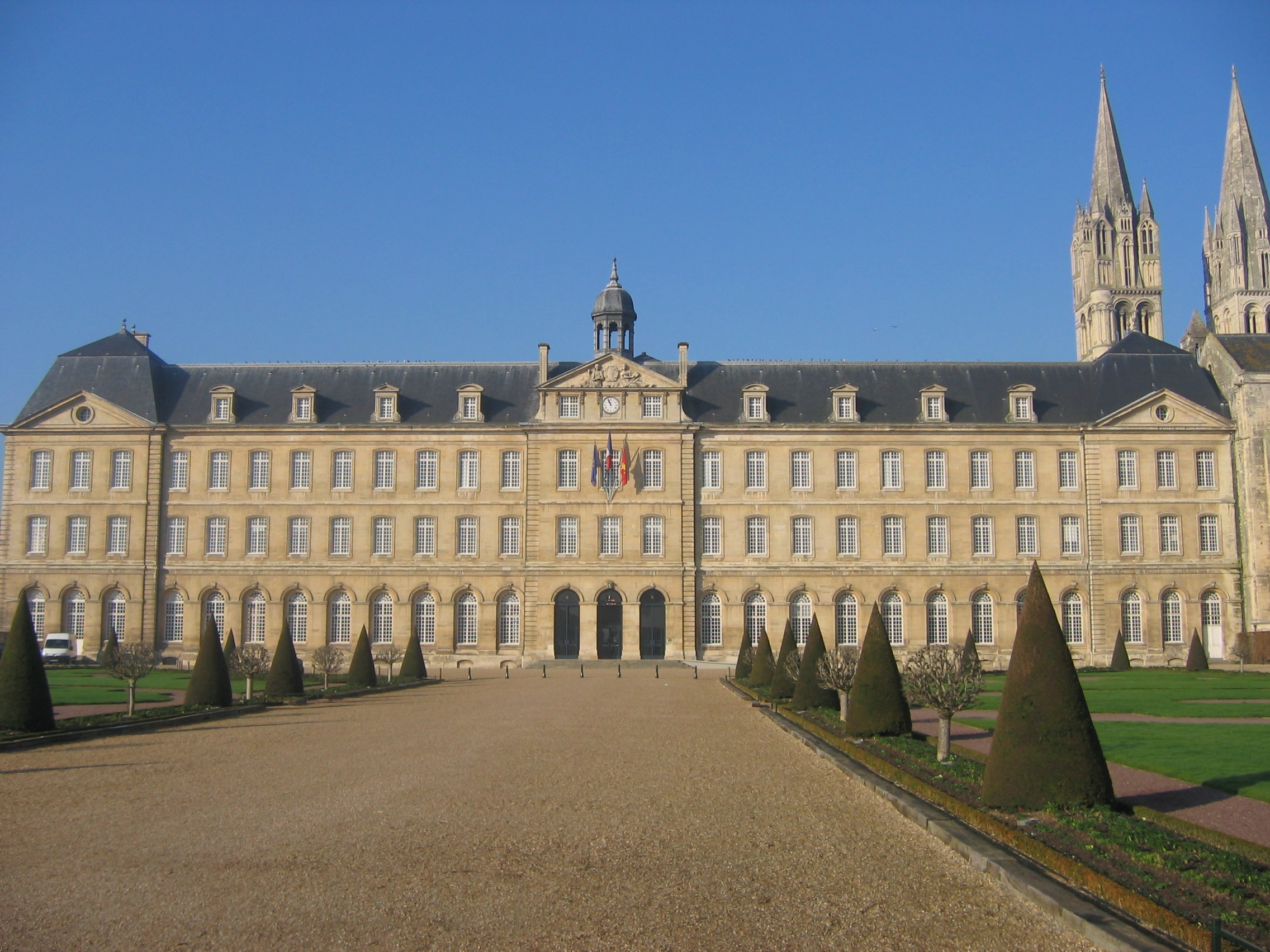

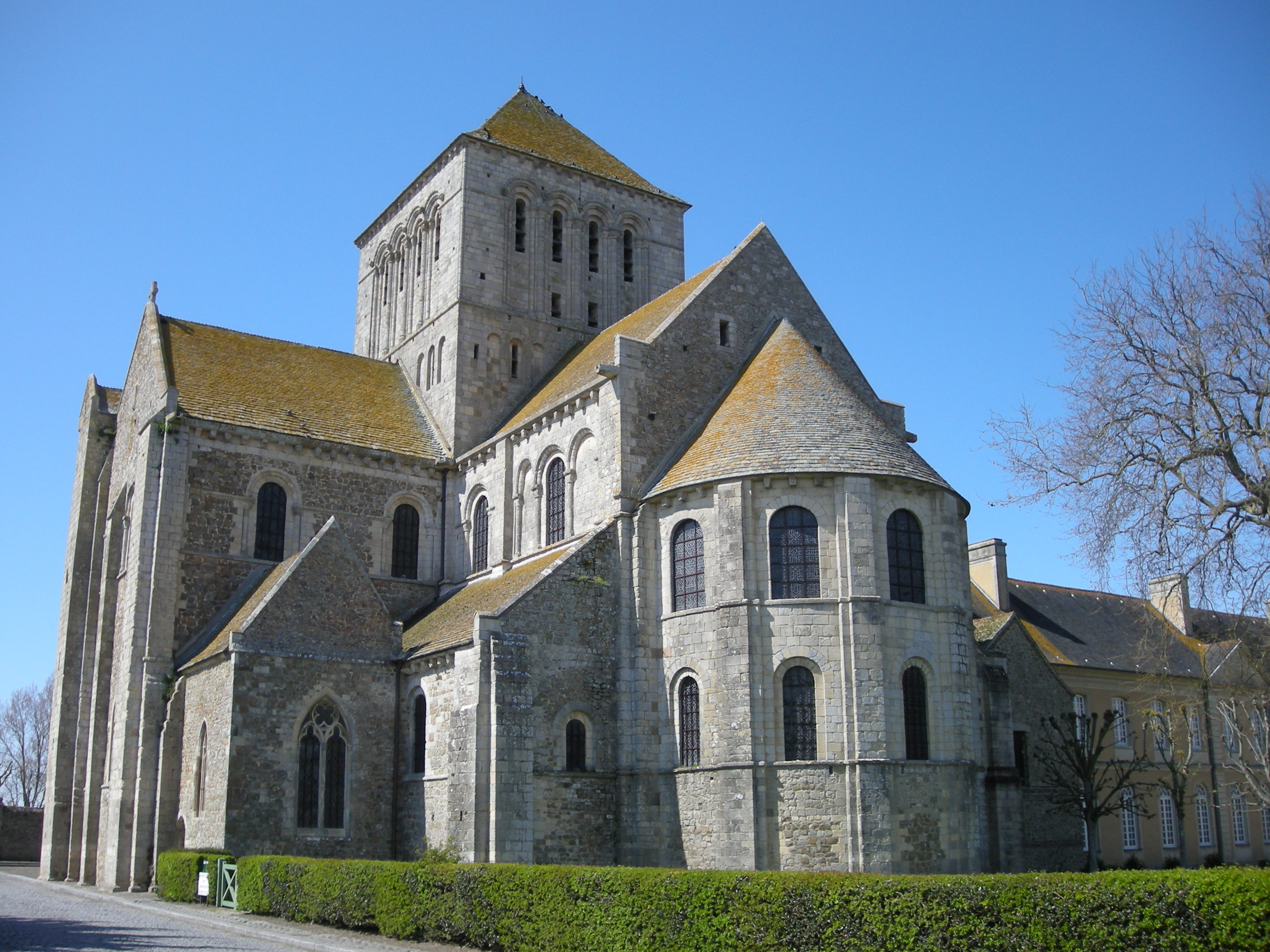

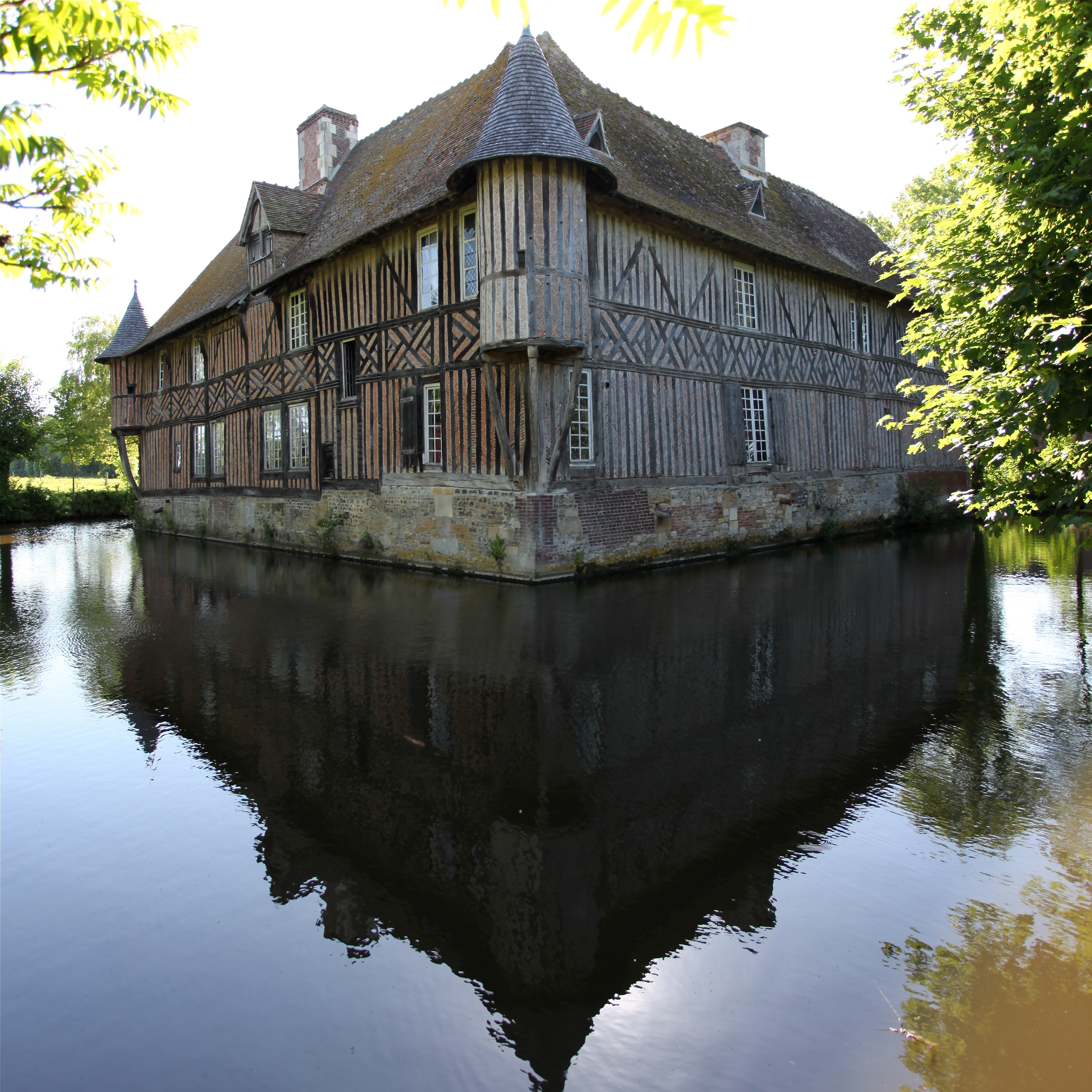

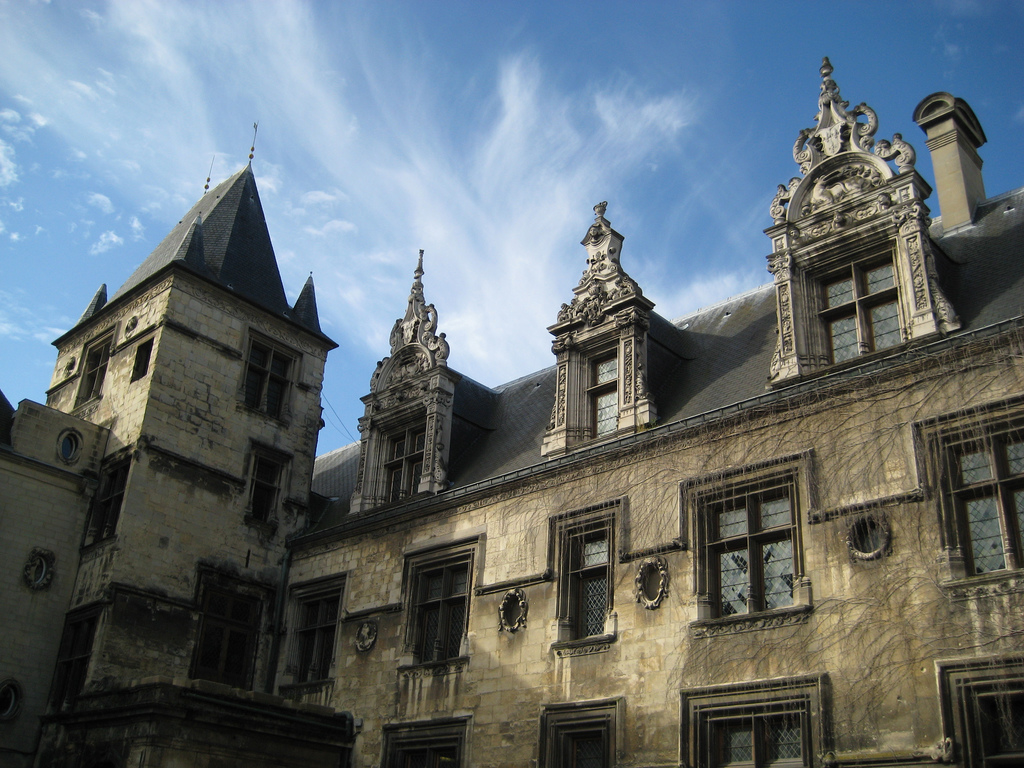

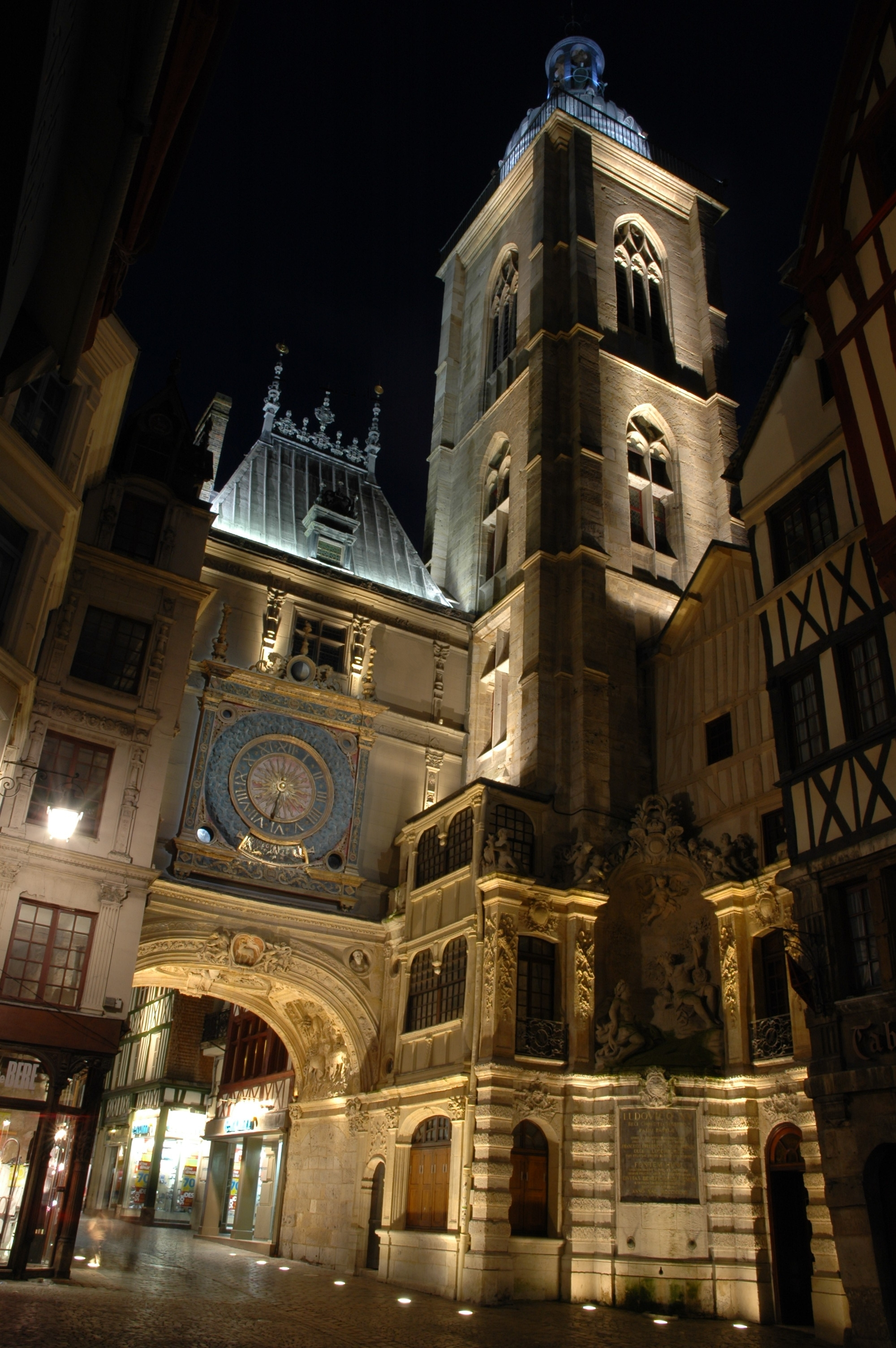

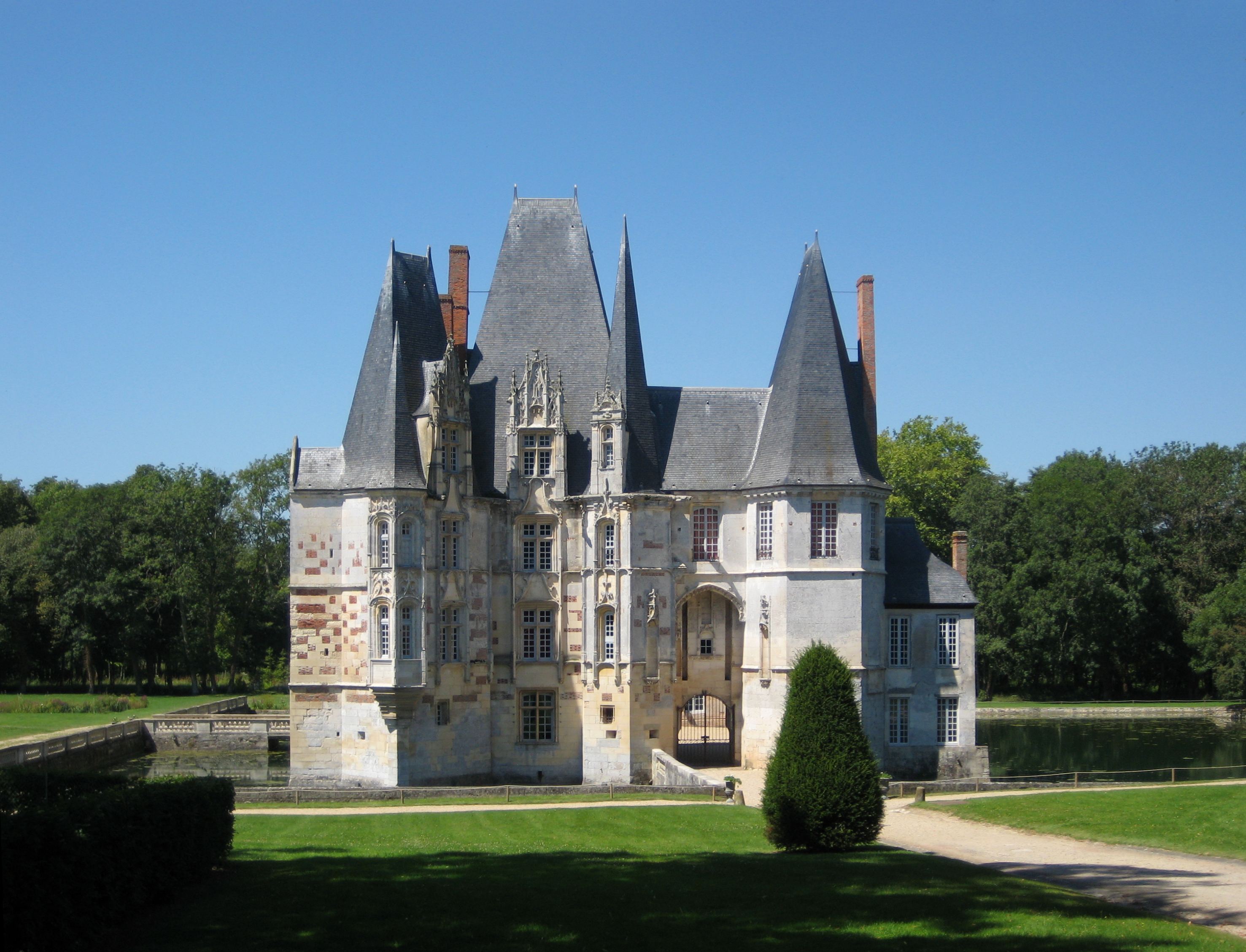

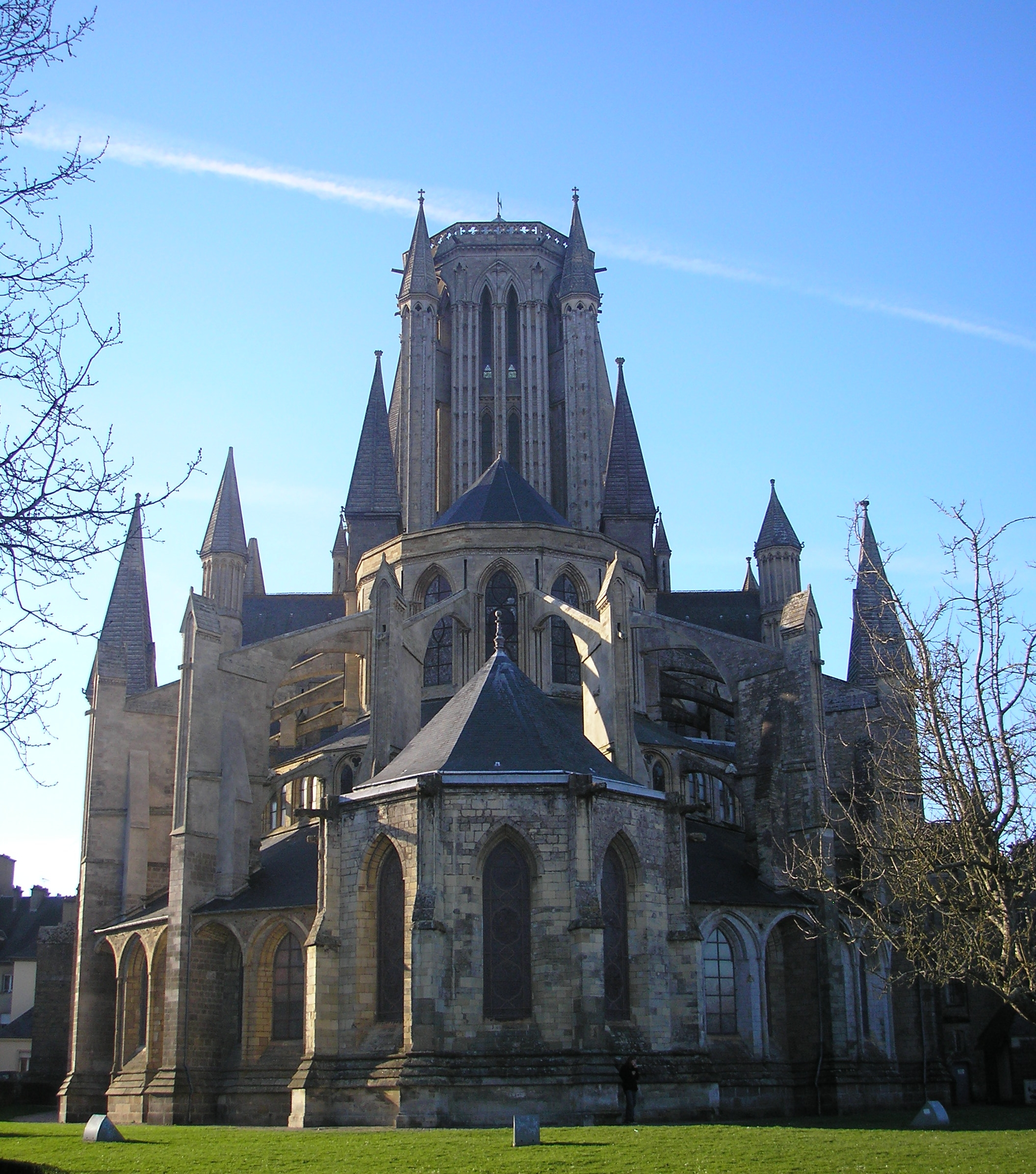

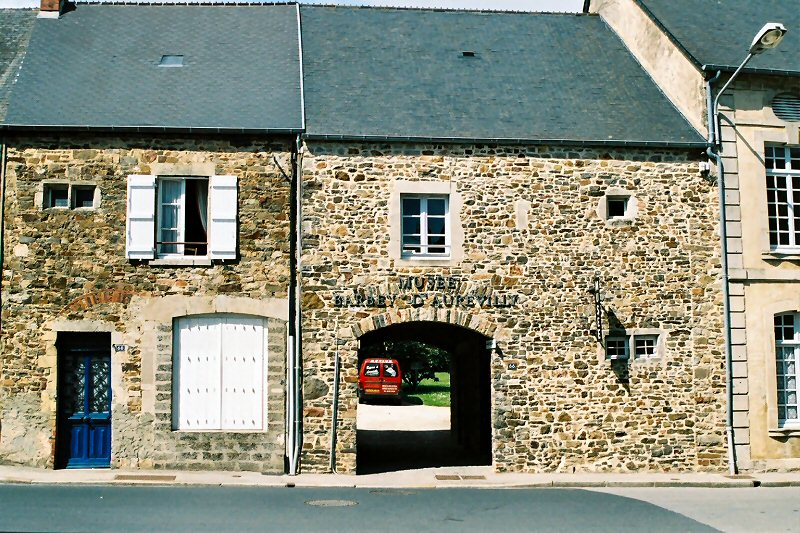

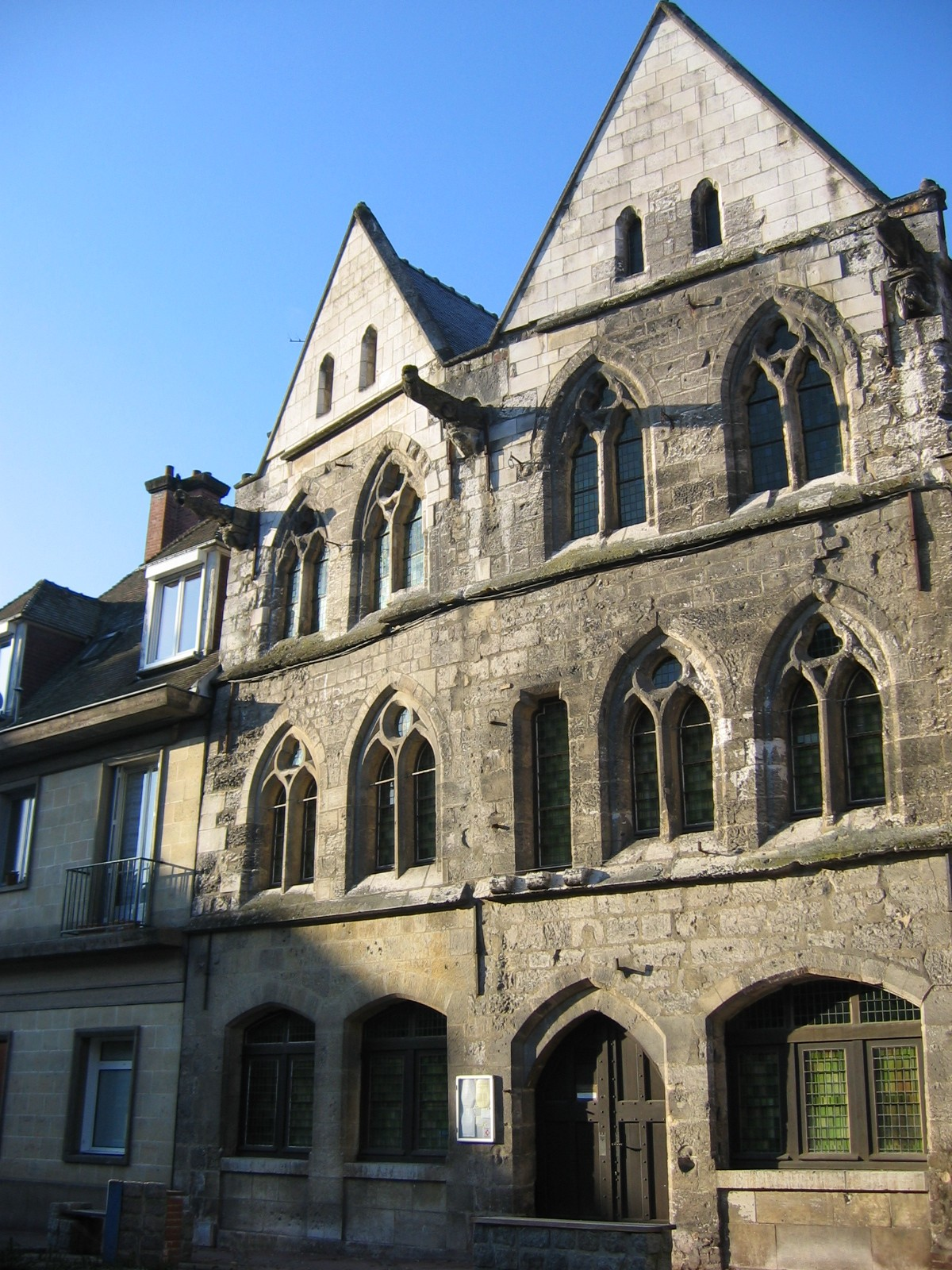
