= Tironensian Order =

Medieval monastic order

Coordinates: 48°18′43″N 0°59′37″E

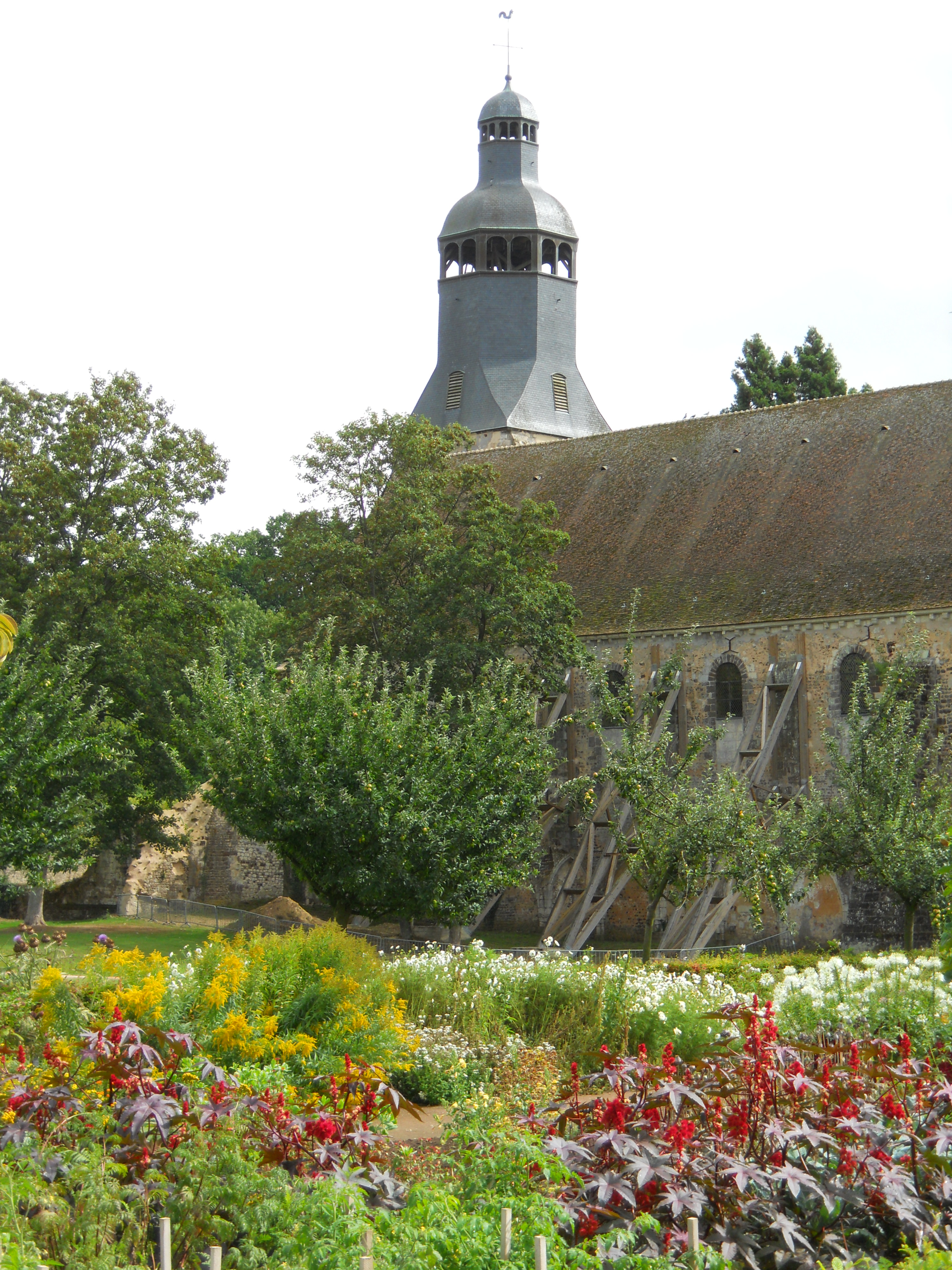
Tiron Abbey, Thiron-Gardais

The Tironensian Order or the Order of Tiron was a medieval monastic order named after the location of the mother abbey (Tiron Abbey, French: Abbaye de la Sainte-Trinité de Tiron, established in 1109) in the woods of Thiron-Gardais (sometimes Tiron) in Perche, some 35 miles west of Chartres in France). (Note: Apparently from the Latin "thironium", a high hill) They were popularly called "Grey Monks" because of their grey robes, which their spiritual cousins, the monks of Savigny, also wore.

== History ==
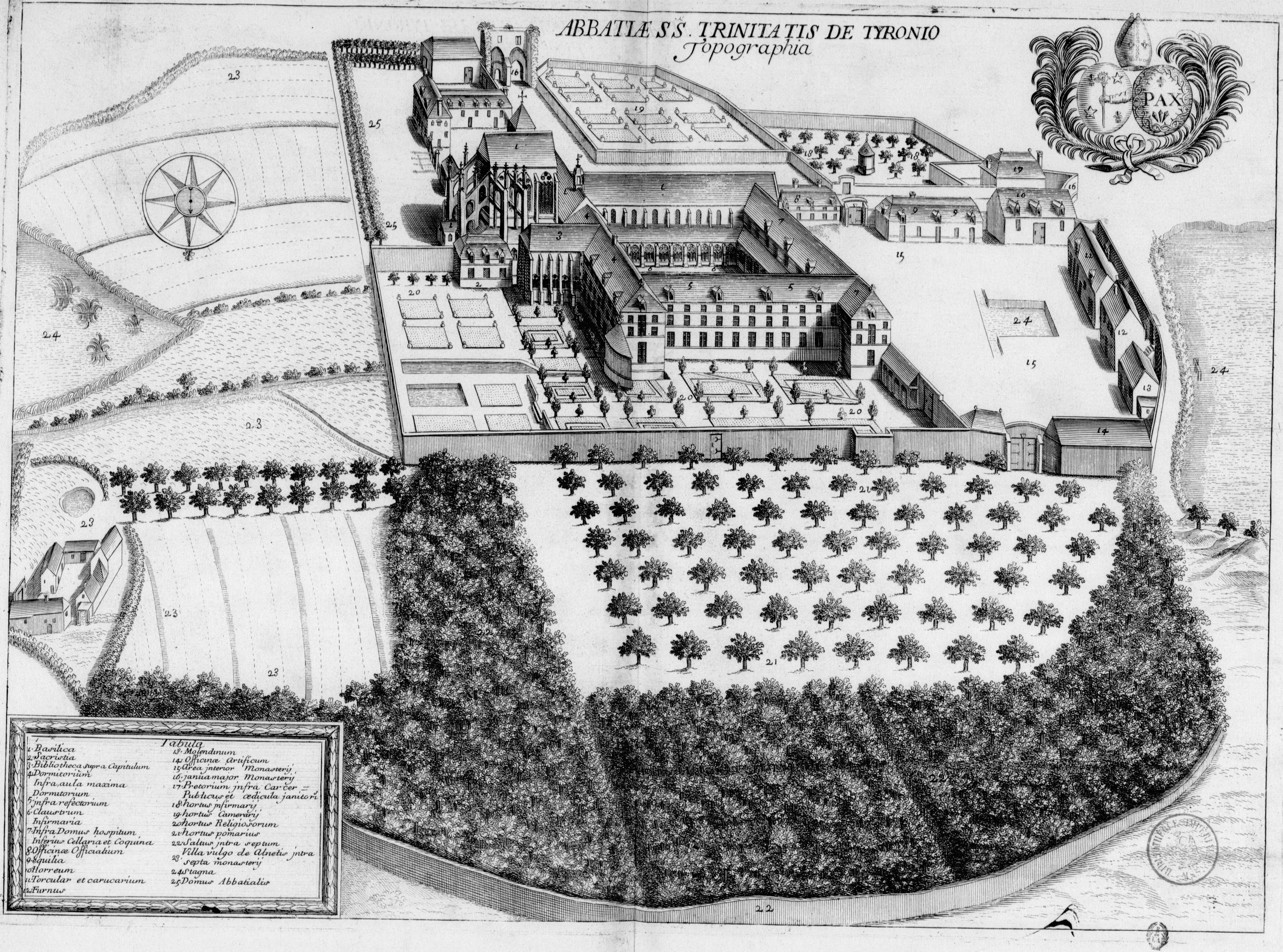
Tiron

=== Founder ===
The order, or congregation, of Tiron was founded in about 1106 by the Benedictine Bernard de Ponthieu, also known as Bernard d'Abbeville (1046–1117), born in a small village near Abbeville, Ponthieu.

Tonsured at the Benedictine Abbey of Saint-Cyprien in Poitiers around the year 1070, Bernard left the order in 1101 when his nomination as abbot of Saint-Savin-sur-Gartempe was disapproved by Cluny and Pope Paschal II. Bernard then lived as a hermit on the island of Chausey, between Jersey and Saint-Malo.

Adelelmus of Flanders was a hermit at Saint-Nicolas in Maine. He joined Bernard on Chausey and under his guidance founded the nunnery of Monastery of Etival-en-Charnie. He then founded a monastery in honor of St. Nicholas for men. His relics are at Etival.

Bernard next relocated to the woods of Craon, near Angers, with two other rigorist monks: Robert d'Arbrissel, future founder of the controversial Abbey of Fontevraud, and Vitalis de Mortain, later the founder of the Congregation of Savigny in 1113. Following the example of the Desert Fathers, all three men and their followers (men and women) lived detached from the world, in great poverty and strict penance.

=== Tiron Abbey ===
The foundation of Tiron Abbey by Bernard of Abbeville was part of wider movements of monastic reform in Europe in the eleventh and twelfth centuries. Bernard's intention was to restore the asceticism and strict observance of the Rule of St. Benedict in monastic life, insisting on manual labour.

In 1107 he and his friend Geoffrey (later Abbot of Tiron), build a small house in a solitary place near Fougeres. A community began to form there. Although the area provided grazing for livestock, it was not well-suited for growing grain or grapes. The monks built workrooms before they began clearing land for fields. During the famine of 1109–1111 the abbey welcomed many displaced persons. It sheltered whole families, including skilled craftsmen. Bernard encourage them to produce goods for sale and the monastery community prospered.

The success of the community aroused the jealousy of the Cluniac monks of Saint-Denis of Nogent-le-Rotrou. He moved his monastery to land in Thiron-Gardais granted to him by Bishop Ivo of Chartres, and placed it under the protection of the cathedral canons of Chartres, instead of a secular overlord. This assured that decisions affecting the abbey were made by a corporate religious body.

Tiron had a school; and after Bernard's death, built houses so that lay women could reside within its walls under the care and protection of the monks. Roger de Port was buried here.

=== Tironensian Order ===
Tiron was the first of the new religious orders to spread internationally. Within less than five years of its creation, the Order of Tiron had 117 priories and abbeys in France, England, Wales, Scotland and Ireland.

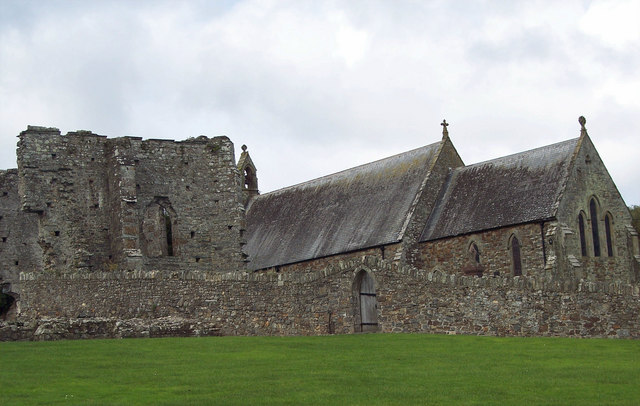
St Dogmaels Abbey

In 1113 Robert FitzMartin granted the Tironensians land and money to found the order's first house in Wales, St Dogmaels, Pembrokeshire, which was established on the site of a clas (early Celtic church), which dated back to at least 600 AD. Closed during the Dissolution of the monasteries, much of the stone was quarried for other uses.

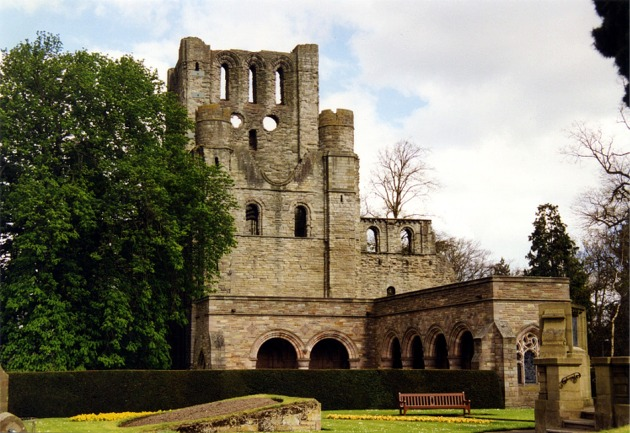
Kelso Abbey

In Scotland, the Tironensians were the monks and master craftsmen who built and occupied (until the Reformation) the abbeys of Selkirk (later re-located to Kelso) (1128), Arbroath (1178), Kilwinning (1140+), and Lindores Abbey, and Newburgh. The first two abbots of Selkirk became, in turn, abbots at Tiron. During the tenure of William of Poitiers as abbot, Tiron established abbeys and priories along the north–south trade routes from Chartres to the navigable Seine and Loire rivers. Under him, the abbey owned at least one ship that traded in Scotland and Northumberland. Tiron adopted a system of annual general chapters. In 1120, Abbot William decreed that abbots from overseas need only attend once in every three years. Arnold, Abbot of Kelso, founded the cathedral church at St Andrews. In France, the order was integrated into the new Benedictine Congregation of St Maur in 1627.

== See also ==
- Caldey Priory
- Kelso Abbey
- Kilwinning Abbey
- Pill Priory
- St Dogmaels Abbey
