= Aichardus =

Saint Aichardus
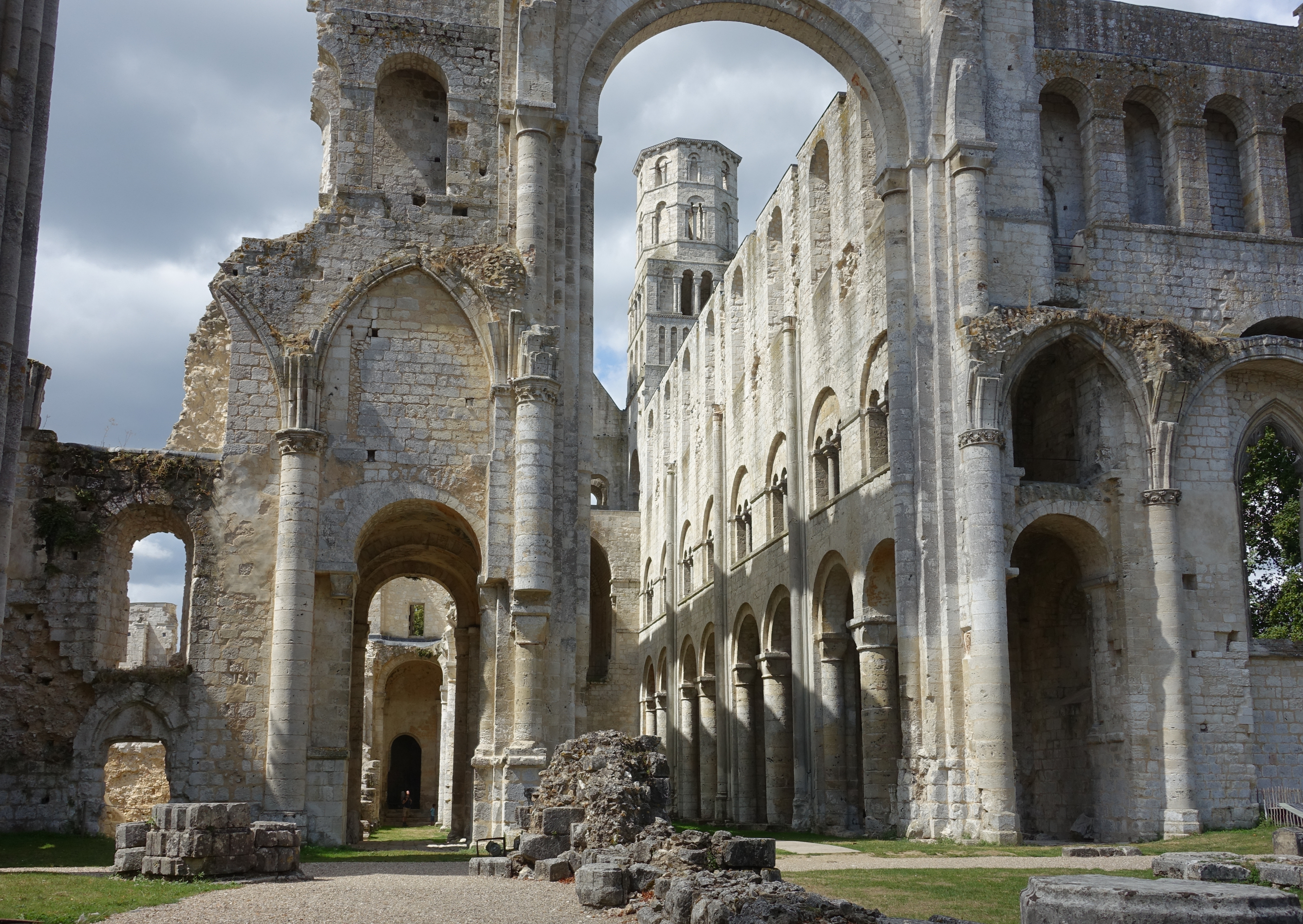
- Ruins of Jumièges Abbey
- Born: France
- Residence: Saint-Jouin Abbey; Quinçay Abbey; Jumièges Abbey
- Died: 687; Jumièges Abbey
- Feast: 15 September
- Attributes: Angel touching monks with a staff

Saint Aichardus (or Achard, Achart, Aicard, Aichard; died 687) was a Frankish Benedictine monk and abbot known for his austerity. He became abbot of Jumièges Abbey, a major religious center that was home to 900 monks. His feast day is 15 September.

== History ==
Saint Aichardus was the son of a military officer of Chlothar II, King of the Franks. He received a monastic education in Poitiers. Although his father wanted him to join the military, his mother intervened and he was allowed to become a monk at Saint-Jouin Abbey in Saint-Jouin-de-Marnes. He spent 39 years at this monastery. When Saint Philibert of Jumièges founded a Benedictine monastery in Quinçay he appointed Aichardus as prior. Philibert died in Jumièges Abbey, and Aichardus succeeded him as abbot of Jumieges. He died in 687 at Jumièges Abbey.

== Monks of Ramsgate account ==
The monks of St Augustine's Abbey, Ramsgate, wrote in their Book of Saints (1921),

AICHARDUS (AICARD, ACHARD) (St.) Abbot. (Sept. 1)
(7th century) The son of an officer at the Court of Clotaire II, born at Poitiers and destined by his father for a military career. But his own wish, which was also that of his mother, that he should consecrate himself to God, was eventually fulfilled, and he took the monastic habit in the Abbey of St. Jouin in Poitou. He became in succession Abbot of the monasteries of Quinzay and Jumieges. Throughout his life, a model of prayer, austerity, and of observance of Religious Rule, he, at his own request, expired (A.D. 687) on a couch of sackcloth and ashes.

== Donnelly's account ==
Eleanor Cecilia Donnelly in her Short Lives of the Saints (1910) wrote,

Saint Achard, Abbot

This holy man was abbot of Jumieges. One of the great monastic retreats of the seventh century, this famous abbey reckoned nine hundred religious brethren within its walls, all under the administration of Saint Achard. The discipline and fervor of this vast community were only equalled by the heavenly charity which animated its members; and when Saint Achard lay upon his death bed about the year 687, he concluded his dying discourse to his monks with these beautiful words: "Vainly will you have borne the yoke of penitence and grown old in the austere practices of the cloister if you love not one another. Without such love martyrdom itself would not render you acceptable in the sight of God. Brotherly charity is the soul of all true religion."

== Butler's account ==
The hagiographer Alban Butler (1710–1773) wrote in his Lives of the Fathers, Martyrs, and Other Principal Saints, under September 15,

Auschair, the father of this saint, an eminent officer in the court and armies of King Clotaire II. and Ermina his mother were distinguished for their birth and riches among the prime nobility of Poitou. Ermina’s particular character was a tender devotion and extraordinary piety, and this treasure she desired above all things to see her son inherit in that perfection in which it is possessed by the saints. There flourished at Poitiers at that time two renowned seminaries of piety and learning; one was the episcopal palace, the other the monastery of Saint Hilary in the suburbs of the city (now a collegiate church, whereof the kings of France are abbots.) In this latter Aicard had his education till he was sixteen years of age, when his father called him home in order to introduce him to court, and teach him to aspire to the highest military honours. The devout mother trembled at the thought of the dangers of forgetting God, to which she apprehended he would be exposed in that state, and earnestly desired, that, as their ambition for their son’s advancement ought to have no other view than that he should become a saint; whatever choice was made, this end alone should be considered in it. To terminate the debate between the parents, the youth was called upon to declare his inclinations. These he expressed to his father with so much earnestness, and in so dutiful and respectful a manner, as drew tears from the aged parent’s eyes, and extorted his consent upon the spot, that seeing his son chose God alone for his portion, he should be at liberty to consecrate himself to the divine service in whatever manner he desired to consummate his sacrifice.

Aicard, without further delay, repaired to the abbey of Saint Jouin in Poitou, near the borders of that province, a house then renowned for the severity of its discipline, and sanctity of its monks. From the first day that he entered this monastery, to the end of his life, he exerted all his endeavours and strength to become every day more resigned, more patient, more humble, more exact in every observance of his rule, and more fervent in the practices of devotion and penance, and in the divine love: thus he never suffered anything to abate his ardour, or to deaden the strong desires of his soul in the pursuit of virtue, studying always to discover whatever defects impaired the perfection of his affections or actions, severely condemning himself, and daily saying with fresh vigour: I have said behold now I have begun. One day being in the garden he seemed to hear a voice which repeated the seventh verse of the eighty-third psalm, that the just shall always go forward from virtue to virtue, growing continually in wisdom, till they arrive at the vision of God; and was wonderfully delighted with this motto and characteristic of true virtue. The saint’s parents, after his retreat, founded the abbey of Saint Bennet at Quinzay, about three miles from Poitiers, and committed the same to the direction of Saint Philibert, who, for fear of the tyranny of Ebroin, had been obliged to leave his monastery of Jumieges, which he had founded in Neuistria, or what is now called Normandy. This holy abbot peopled Quinzay with a colony from Jumieges, as he had done a little before another monastery which he founded in the isle of Hero, on the coasts of Poitou. Saint Philibert constituted Saint Aicard first abbot of Quinzay, but finding it impossible to return himself to Jumieges, which he looked upon as the principal among all the religious foundations he had ever established, he resigned that abbacy to Saint Aicard, and remained himself at Quinzay. There were then at Jumieges nine hundred monks, among whom Saint Aicard exceedingly promoted all the exercises of monastic perfection, and sacred studies among those whom he judged best qualified for them. He at first exhorted his religious brethren only by his example; and this manner of exhorting, dumb as it was, proved most effectual.

His assiduity in prayer, his modesty, his meekness, the austerity of his penance, and his scrupulous observance of every part of the rule, made every one extremely desirous to hear him speak whom they saw do so well. He soon satisfied their impatience, by giving them admirable lessons on all the duties of Christian perfection, especially on self-denial and the entire disengagement of the heart from the world and all creatures. His instructions were delivered in so tender and pathetic a manner, that every word made a deep impression on the hearts of all who heard him. It was the custom of his community for every monk to shave his crown on all Saturdays. Saint Aicard having once been hindered on the Saturday, began to shave himself very early on the Sunday morning, before the divine office; but was touched with remorse in that action, and is said to have seen in a vision a devil picking up every hair which he had cut off at so undue a time, to produce against him at the divine tribunal. The holy man desisted, and passed the day with his head half shaved; and in that condition grievously accused and condemned himself in full chapter with abundance of tears. Those who truly consider the infinite sanctity of God, and the great purity of affections and fidelity in all duties which we owe to him, watch, like Job, with holy fear over their hearts in all they do, being well assured that no failures will escape the vigilance of their accusers, or the all-piercing eye and rigorous justice of their judge. Saint Aicard, in his last moments, being laid on ashes and covered with sackcloth, said to the monks: “My dear children, never forget the last advice, and, as it were, the testament of your most tender father. I conjure you in the name of our divine Saviour always to love one another, and never to suffer the least coldness towards any brother to take place for a moment in your breasts, by which perfect charity, which is the mark of the elect, may suffer any prejudice in your souls. In vain have you borne the yoke of penance, and are grown old in the exercise of religious duties, if you do not sincerely love one another. Without this, martyrdom itself cannot render you acceptable to God. Fraternal charity is the soul of a religious house.” Having spoken these words, lifting up his hands and eyes towards heaven, he happily surrendered his soul into the hands of his Creator on the 15th of September, about the year of our Lord 687, in the sixty-third year of his age. A church was built at Jumieges in his honour. During the incursions of the Normans and Danes his relics were conveyed to Hapres, a priory between Cambray and Valenciennes, dependant on the great abbey of Saint Vaast, and have since remained at the disposal of this monastery.

== Sources ==
- Butler, Alban (1833), The Lives of the Fathers, Martyrs, and Other Principal Saints: In Two Volumes, Coyne This article incorporates text from this source, which is in the public domain.
- Donnelly, Eleanor Cecilia (1910), Short Lives of the Saints, Benziger
- "Saint Aichardus", CatholicSaints.info, September 14, 2010
- "St. Aichardus - Saints & Angels", Catholic Online
- St. Augustine's Abbey, Ramsgate (1921), The Book of saints : a dictionary of servants of God canonized by the Catholic Church, London: A. & C. Black, ltd. This article incorporates text from this source, which is in the public domain.
- "Latin Saints of the Orthodox Patriarchate of Rome", orthodoxengland.org.uk
