= Bernard of Thiron =

French Roman Catholic saint

Saint Bernard of Thiron
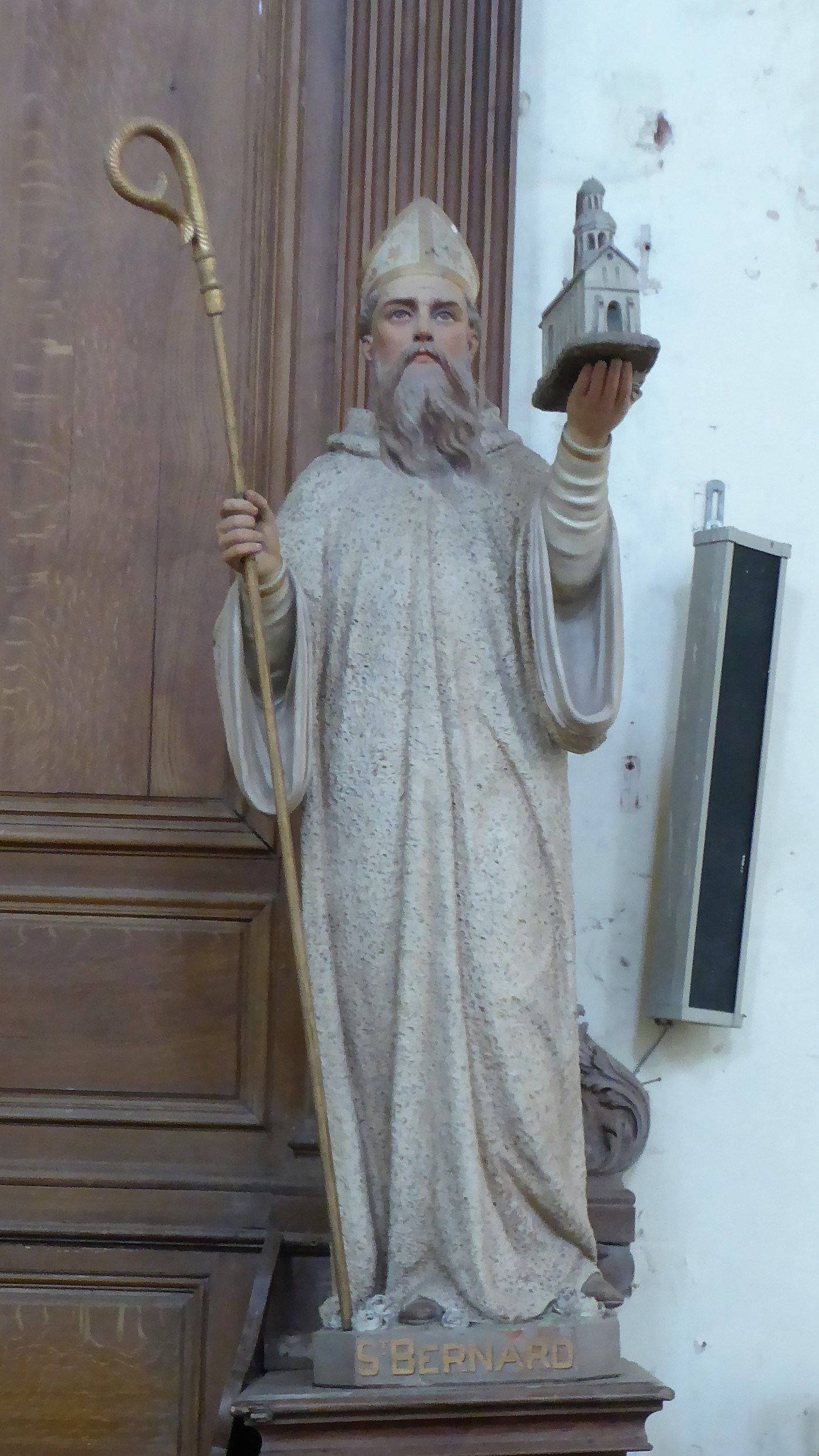
- Born: 1046; Abbeville, France
- Died: 14 April 1117; Tiron Abbey, Thiron Gardais, France
- Venerated in: Roman Catholic Church
- Feast: 27 April

Bernard of Thiron, also known as Bernard of Ponthieu and Bernard of Abbeville, was the founder of the Tiron Abbey and the Tironensian Order.

== Early life ==
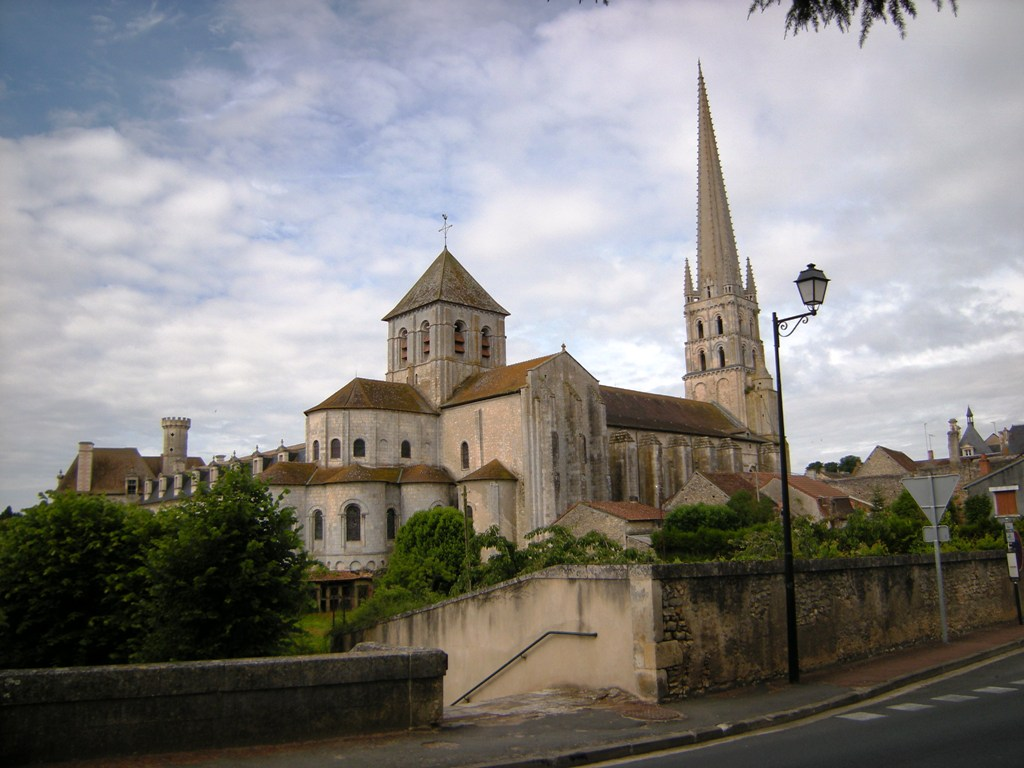
Saint-Savin-sur-Gartempe

Born near Abbeville in 1046. At the age of 19 he was accepted at the monastery of Saint-Cyprien, near Poitiers. He remained there ten years, before being transferred to Saint-Savin-sur-Gartempe to fill the position of prior. When the abbot was convicted of simony in 1082, Bernard assumed the responsibilities of superior. Bernard left Saint-Savin in 1101 when his nomination as new abbot was disapproved by Cluny and Pope Paschal II.

== Life as a hermit ==
Bernard went first to the hermit Peter of l’Etoile, before travelling to Vital of Savigny’s earlier hermit community at Dompierre near Passais, where following the example of the Desert Fathers, he lived detached from the world, in great poverty and strict penance. As a hermit, he supported himself by woodworking. He then went to Saint-Médard, in the region of Saint-Mars-sur-la-Futaie. He lived as a hermit there for a short period of time before being discovered by fellow monks from Saint-Savin. Unwilling to return to his previous post, Bernard fled to the island of Chausey, between Jersey and Saint-Malo, where he braved harsh conditions and lived in a cave, before finally listening to his former companions, Bernard returned to the mainland, settling in Fontaine-Géhard near Châtillon-sur-Colmont.

There he gained many followers to his hermit way of life, including Adelelmus of Flanders. The community grew into a centre for hermits, with many building cells around his. Bernard fame grew eventually gaining the attention of the Saint Cyprien Monastery. Abbot Renault then called for Bernard to return to the monastery bringing with him his new followers. Bernard returned and resumed the habit as well as being appointed Renault's successor.

== Later life and founding of Tiron Abbey ==
In 1100, Bernard was elected Abbot of Saint-Cyprien Monastery. He attended the Council of Poitiers, and Bernard and Robert of Arbrissel excommunicated Philip I, king of the Franks. That same year Paschal II made Saint-Cyprien subordinate to Cluny. The following year, Bernard, Robert of Arbrissel, and Vitalis of Savigny preach in Normandy.

In 1102 Bernard went to Rome to press Saint-Cyprien's claims against the Cluny Order. Once again retires briefly to Chausey, before forming a hermit community at Chennedet, which separates from Vitalis of Savigny's earlier community. Desiring to live a life of greater austerity, in 1107 he and his friend Geoffrey (later Abbot of Tiron), build a small house in a solitary place near Fougeres. A community began to form there.

The success of the community aroused the jealousy of the Cluniac monks of Saint-Denis of Nogent-le-Rotrou claim tithes and burial fees from Tiron. Bernard then refounded his monastery on adjacent land in Thiron-Gardais granted to him by Bishop Ivo of Chartres. Here Bernard established the monastery that would become the Abbey of Tiron. With the aid of donations from the kings and nobles of France, England and Scotland, Bernard established the Abbey of the Holy Trinity of Tiron in 1114. The Abbey founded a number of daughter houses. From here Bernard founded the Tironensian Order, based on a strict observance of the Rule of Saint Benedict and an emphasis on manual labour. He remained there until his death in 1117.

== Bibliography ==
- Bernard de Tiron, dans Alphonse-Victor Angot, Ferdinand Gaugain, Dictionnaire historique, topographique et biographique de la Mayenne, Goupil, 1900–1910
- Geoffrey Grossus The Life of Blessed Bernard of Tiron The Catholic University of America Press (2009)
- Kathleen Thompson The Monks of Tiron. A Monastic Community and Religious Reform in the Twelfth Century, Cambridge, Cambridge University Press (2014), ISBN 9781139108690.
