= Abbey of Saint-Cyprien =

Former Benedictine abbey in Poitiers, France

Saint-Cyprien Abbey
- Abbaye Saint-Cyprien de Poitiers
- Interactive map of Saint-Cyprien Abbey

Monastery information
- Order: Benedictine
- Established: 828 (traditional)
- Mother house: Cluny Abbey
- Dedication: Cyprian
- Diocese: Poitiers

People
- Founder: Pepin I of Aquitaine (traditional)

Site
- Location: Poitiers, Vienne, France
- Country: France
- Visible remains: Romanesque remains

Saint-Cyprien Abbey (French: Abbaye Saint-Cyprien de Poitiers) was a Benedictine abbey in Poitiers, Vienne, France that had an important influence on the Counts of Poitiers. Famous monks included Martin of Jumièges and Bernard of Tiron.

== History ==
The abbey's foundation is traditionally attributed to Pepin I of Aquitaine in 828. Around 857, it was destroyed by Vikings. Frotier II, Bishop of Poitiers, restored the abbey during the first quarter of the 10th century.

The abbey church was consecrated under Abbot Martin of Jumièges in 935–936, in the presence of William "Towhead", Count of Poitiers. William was buried there on 3 April 963.

The abbey was attached to Cluny Abbey before 1058. Bishop of Poitiers Isembert II confirmed this arrangement in 1076, followed by several popes up to 1125.

The abbey was ruined during the French Wars of Religion and reformed in 1645. In the 19th century, Romanesque remains were uncovered during excavations, and the site became the Pasteur Hospital.

=== Abbots ===
- 933–934: Martin, later abbot of Jumièges Abbey and Saint-Jean-d'Angély Abbey
- Martin d'Aubusson
- Renault
- Bernard of Tiron, founder of Tiron Abbey
- c. 1600: Henri-Louis Chasteigner de La Roche-Posay, Bishop of Poitiers

== Bibliography ==
- Neveux, François (2008). A Brief History of the Normans. Constable & Robinson. ISBN 9780762433711.
- Oberste, Jörg. "Clunisiens et l'espace urbain en France" Mélanges de l'École française de Rome: Moyen Âge 124:1 (2012).
- Redet, Louis-François-Xavier. de l'abbaye de Saint-Cyprien de Poitiers. Poitiers: Imprimerie de H. Oudin, 1874.
