= Martin of Jumièges =

10th-century Benedictine abbot

Martin
- Abbot of Jumièges
- Native name: Martinus
- Church: Catholic Church

Personal details
- Died: 21 March 943 Poitiers, France

Martin of Jumièges (died 21 March 943) was a 10th-century Benedictine abbot. He served as abbot of Saint-Cyprien Abbey, Poitiers and also refounded Jumièges Abbey, playing an important role in the restoration of monastic life in Normandy which had been devastated following the Viking invasions. The restoration of Jumièges had been a particular project of William Longsword, ruler of Normandy.

== Sources ==
- Douglas, David C. (May 1964). William the Conqueror: The Norman Impact Upon England.
- Neveux, François (2008). A Brief History of the Normans. Constable & Robinson. ISBN 9780762433711.
