= Manoir du Clap =

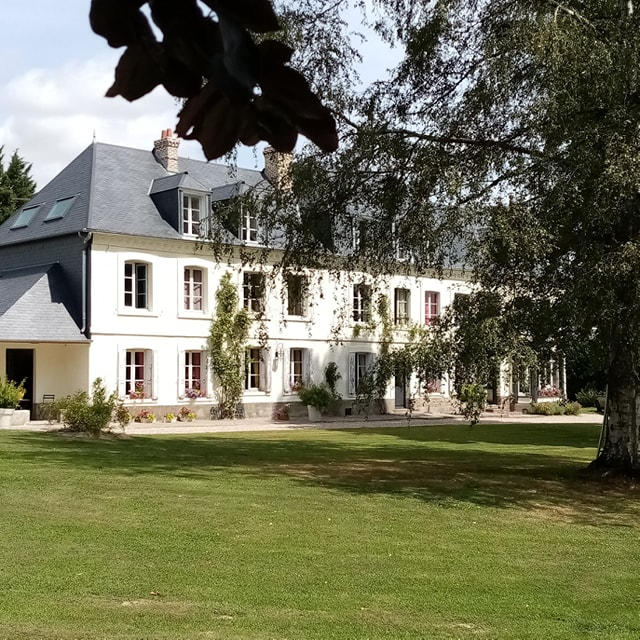
- Interactive map of the Manoir du Clap area

General information
- Status: Siege of the lord's power (circa XVIe, XVIIe)
- Type: Manor
- Location: France
- Coordinates: 49°30′00.3″N 0°25′17″E
- Construction started: 16th century
- Construction stopped: Around 1900
- Owner: Prévost Family

The Manoir du Clap is a manor house located in the village of La Cerlangue, in Upper Normandy. The domain of "Le Clap" also includes old stables, an ancient shed, and some other buildings. The older part of the house was built at the end of the 16th century, under the reign of Henry IV of France. It was extended at the end of the 18th century, and again at the end of the 19th century.

== History ==
During the 11th century, the village of La Cerlangue was at the edge of the forest of Lillebonne. Lillebonne was an important city that was extended by Richard II in 1025. It became the chief town of the duchy, thanks to William the Conqueror. At that time, La Cerlangue was a part of the barony of Tancarville. Jacques Le Maho describes the town as a "domaine non fieffé" which belonged to the Baron of Tancarville. Then it became a "comté" (French equivalent of an earldom), under the dominion of Jean II de Melun, the Count of Tancarville, La Cerlangue was considered as the "prévosté of La Cerlangue". During the Hundred Years' War, an English earldom of Tankerville [sic] was created, in parallel with the French county.

After that war, lords and landowners rebuilt the destroyed mansions, castles and manor houses. The Manoir du Clap was built a hundred years after the conflict, in a place called "Le Clap", not far from La Cerlangue. The wars of religion ended at the time. The Manor of Le Clap was built around 1598. That spot was particularly dynamic. Jens Christian Moesgaard testifies that the road starting from Tancarville, reaching La Cerlangue and passing through Le Clap was a local economical node. A noble family decided to build a manor house here. This is the first phase of the Manoir du Clap. A rapier and various old pieces of furniture attest that this settlement happened during the reign of Henri IV, more precisely, between 1590 and 1608.

In 1740, the manor was bought by the Yon family, who modified it. The family added 18th-century mouldings (in Louis XV, Louis XVI and Directoire styles).

At the end of the 19th century, the mansion was enlarged, and a big banqueting room was added to the building. The enlarged house was able to host special guests, including the composer Arthur Honegger, who recited "Jeanne d'arc au Bûcher" to the family in 1935.
