= Thiron-Gardais =

- Commune
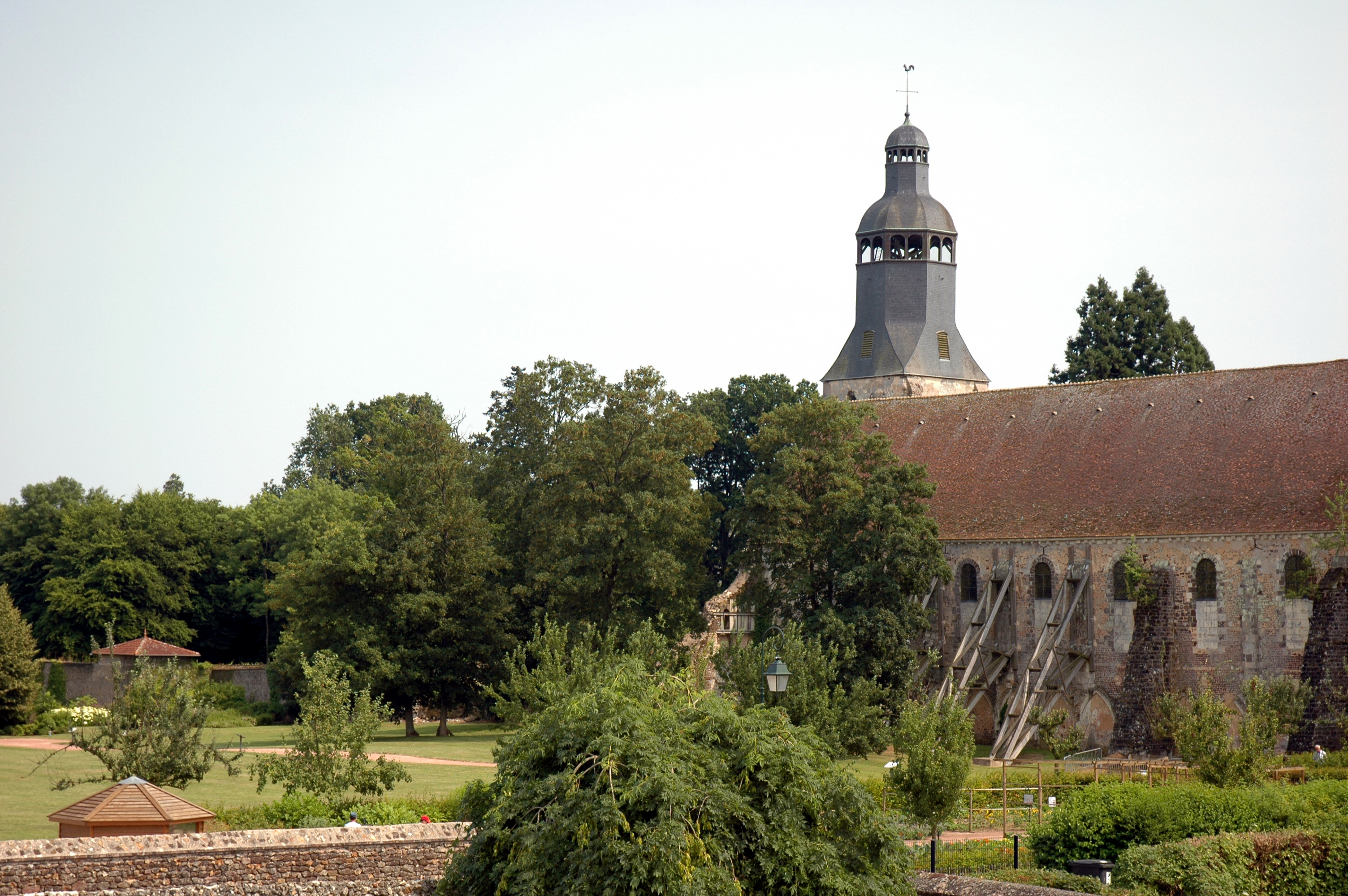
- Abbey of the Holy Trinity

- Coat of arms
- Location of Thiron-Gardais
- Location within France Location within Centre-Val de Loire
- Coordinates: 48°18′41″N 0°59′44″E
- Country: France
- Region: Centre-Val de Loire
- Department: Eure-et-Loir
- Arrondissement: Nogent-le-Rotrou
- Canton: Nogent-le-Rotrou

Government
  - Mayor (2024–2026): François Dordoigne
- Area^{1}: 13.46 km^{2} (5.20 sq mi)
- Elevation: 238 m (781 ft)
- Highest elevation: 279 m (915 ft)
- Lowest elevation: 200 m (660 ft)
- Population (2023): 962
  - Density: 71.5/km^{2} (185/sq mi)
- Time zone: UTC+01:00 (CET)
  - Summer (DST): UTC+02:00 (CEST)
- INSEE/Postal code: 28387 /28480
- ^{1} French Land Register data, which excludes lakes, ponds, glaciers > 1 km^{2} (0.386 sq mi or 247 acres) and river estuaries.

Thiron-Gardais (French pronunciation: [tiʁɔ̃ ɡaʁdɛ], before 1987: Thiron) is a commune in the Eure-et-Loir department in northern France. The Tiron Abbey is located in the commune.

== Population ==
Historical population
Year	Pop.	±% p.a.
1968	616	—
1975	854	+4.78%
1982	1,019	+2.56%
1990	1,171	+1.75%
1999	1,121	−0.48%
2007	1,101	−0.22%
2012	1,067	−0.63%
2017	995	−1.39%
2023	962	−0.56%
Source: INSEE

== See also ==
- Tironensian Order
- Communes of the Eure-et-Loir department
