= Jumièges Abbey =

Abbey in Seine-Maritime, France

Coordinates: 49.431944°N 0.819167°E

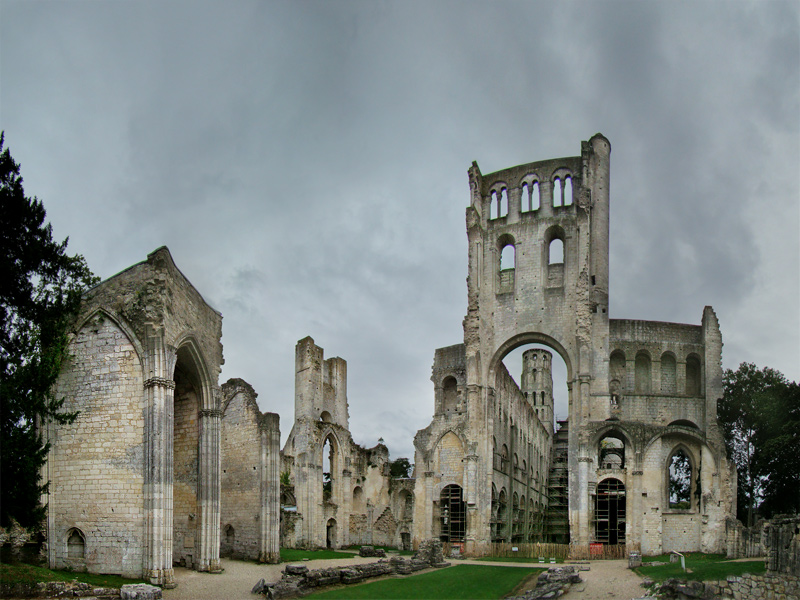
Jumièges Abbey ruins

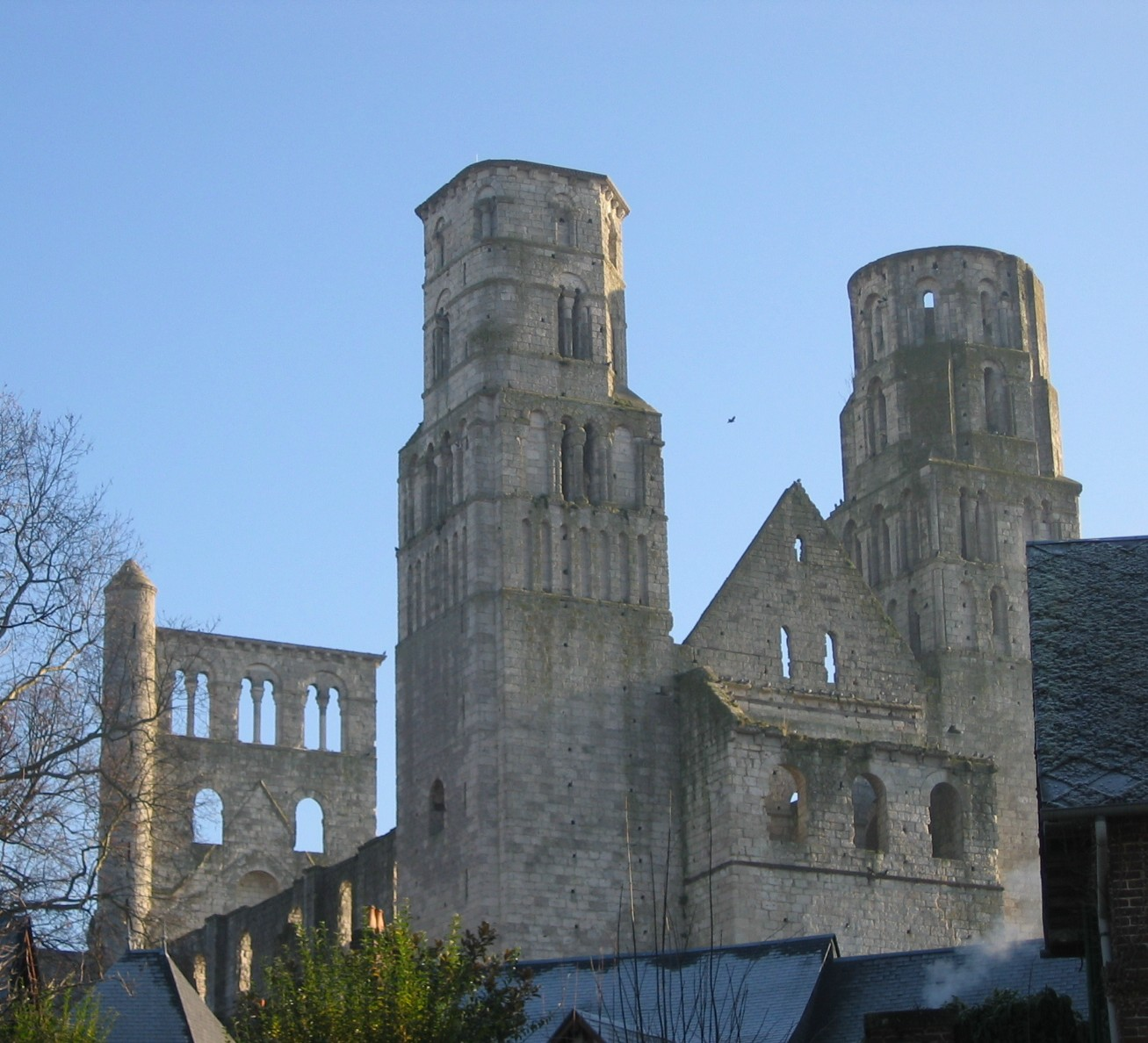
Jumièges Abbey

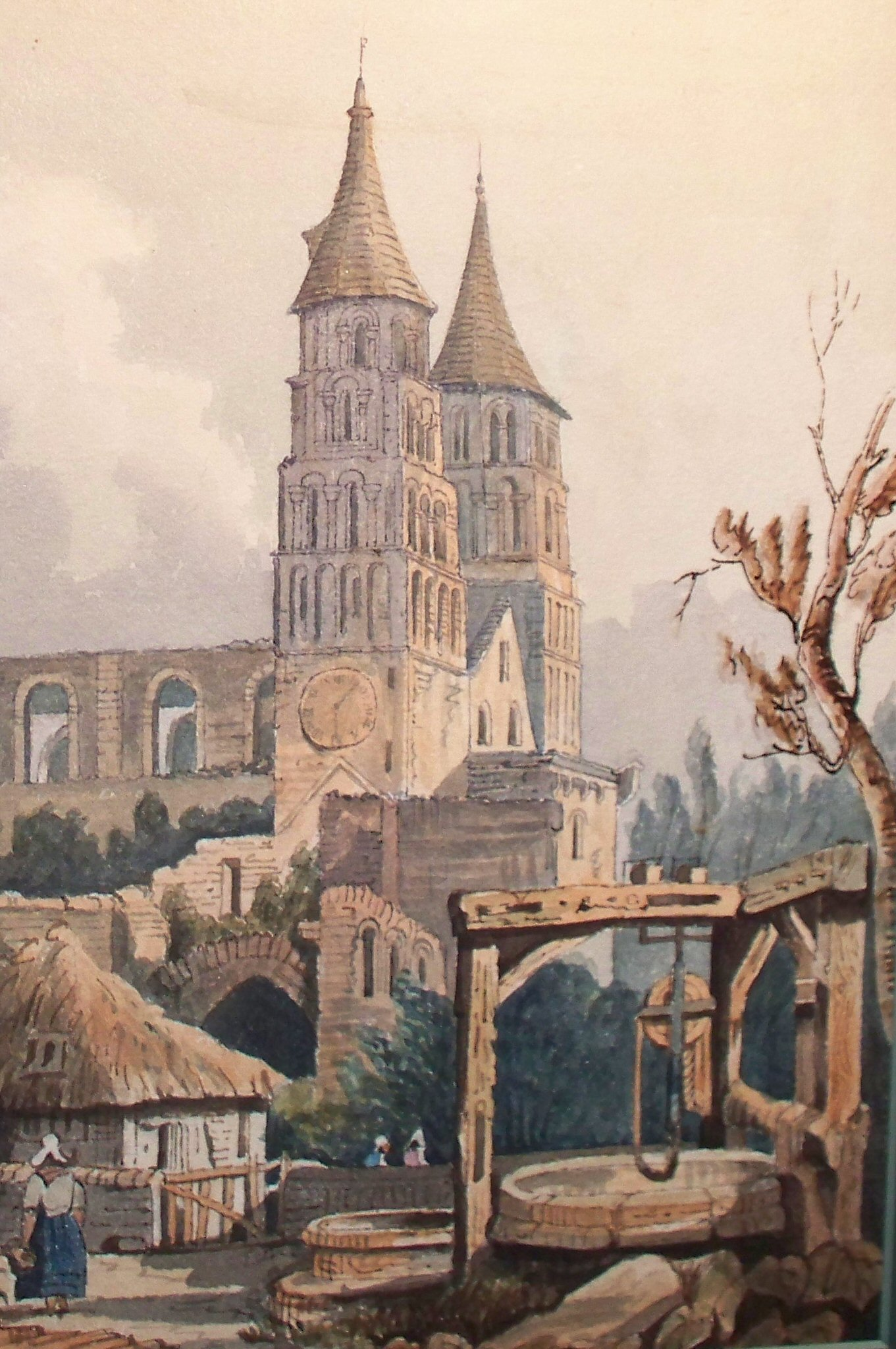
Jumièges Abbey, as painted by John Sell Cotman in 1818

Jumièges Abbey (Latin: Monasterium Gemeticensis), formally the Abbey of St Peter at Jumièges (French: Abbaye Saint-Pierre de Jumièges), was a Benedictine monastery. Its ruins are in the commune of Jumièges in the Seine-Maritime Departement of Normandy, France.

== Foundation ==
In 654 Clovis II of Neustria, through the influence of his wife Balthild, gave forested land from royal holdings to the former nobleman and courtier Philibert on which he founded the abbey. Balthild's generosity added "many gifts and pastures from the royal fisc" but due to a conflict with Ebroin, the mayor of the palace, he was exiled from Neustria. Jumièges prospered under its second abbot Aichardus with around 900 monks.

Starting in 788, Charlemagne kept Tassilo III, the recently dethroned Agilolfing Duke of Bavaria and one of his sons (and thus a possibly dangerous avenger and successor), Theodo, arrested in the abbey.

In 841 it was pillaged and burnt to the ground by the Vikings and the community left first for the Abbey of Saint-Riquier and then Haspres Abbey which nominally became a dependent priory and stayed that way after they returned and until 1025.

== Norman Refoundation ==
When the Duchy of Normandy was established the church gradually gained greater security due to the support of successive dukes of Normandy. William Longsword, the second Duke of Normandy, was particularly interested in rebuilding Jumièges.

Following the marriage of his sister Adèle of Normandy to William of Aquitaine, William Longsword requested monks from Aquitaine to help rebuild the monastery. Twelve Monks came from the Abbey of Saint-Cyprien in Poitiers, led by their abbot Martin and the community in Haspres was invited back with at least two monks returning. Among the monks was probably Annon, who later succeeded him as abbot.

Longsword personally accompanied Martin from Rouen to Jumièges and entrusted him with restoring the monastery. Martin became abbot of Jumièges in either 938 or sometime between 7 January and 5 April 942. Under Martin's leadership the monastic buildings were repaired, and on 5 April 942 the high altar of the restored church of Saint Peter was consecrated and in general the abbey was rebuilt on a larger scale than the original by William Longsword.

According to a later tradition in the monastery also repeated by Dudo of Saint-Quentin and Orderic Vitalis Martin refused Longsword's request to become a monk due to his greater value to the church as a ruler. The Complainte de Guillaume Longue-Épée ("Lament for William Longsword") may have originated within Martin's circle.

Jumièges became a center of scholarship educating prominent monks such as the historian, William of Jumièges. In 1015 the famous Italian monk William of Volpiano, abbot of Fecamp, introduced monastic reforms. and the abbey became a model for all Normandy's monasteries. A new Romanesque church started to be built in 1040 was consecrated in 1067 in the presence of William the Conqueror. The abbey gained a reputation for its charitable work, particularly its relief of the poor.

The abbots of Jumièges became important politicians with one of them, Robert Champart, becoming first Bishop of London in 1044 and later Archbishop of Canterbury under Edward the Confessor. Many others became French bishops and cardinals.

== French Rule ==
The church was enlarged in 1256. The abbey suffered due to the English campaign in Normandy during the Hundred Years War, but it recovered and maintained its prosperity and high position until the whole province was devastated in the French Wars of Religion. The church was restored in 1573. and regained some of its reputation after it was taken over by the Maurists in 1649.

The monks were dispersed during the French Revolution leaving only the twin towers and western façade of the church and portions of the cloisters and library. In the middle of the former cloister, there is still the 500-year-old yew tree. A gallery of the cloister was bought by Lord Stuart de Rothesay to rebuild it in Highcliffe Castle near Bournemouth, Dorset. The contents of the library were taken to Rouen.

The Nobel Prize-winning French novelist Roger Martin du Gard devoted his dissertation to an archaeological study of the ruins.

== See also ==
- List of Merovingian monasteries
- Merovingian architecture
- Merovingian art

== Sources ==
- Brown, R. Allen (1994), The Normans and the Norman Conquest, Boydell & Brewer
- Alston, Cyprian (1913). "Benedictine Abbey of Jumièges" . In Herbermann, Charles (ed.). Catholic Encyclopedia. New York: Robert Appleton Company.
- Douglas, David C. (May 1964). William the Conqueror: The Norman Impact Upon England.
- Fouracre, Paul; Gerberding, Richard A. (1996). Late Merovingian France: History and Hagiography, 640-720. Manchester University Press. ISBN 978 0 7190 47916.
- Gazeau, Véronique (2007). Normannia monastica (Xe–XIIe siècle) (in French). Vol. 1. Caen: Publications du CRAHM. ISBN 978-2-902685-38-7.
- Gazeau, Véronique (2010). Normannia monastica (Xe–XIIe siècle) (in French). Vol. 2. Caen: Publications du CRAHM. ISBN 978-2-902685-38-7.
- Morris, Marc (2012). The Norman Conquest: The Battle of Hastings and the Fall of Anglo-Saxon England'. ISBN 978-1-4481-3602-5.
- Neveux, François (2008). A Brief History of the Normans. Constable & Robinson. ISBN 9780762433711.
