= Quinçay =

- Commune
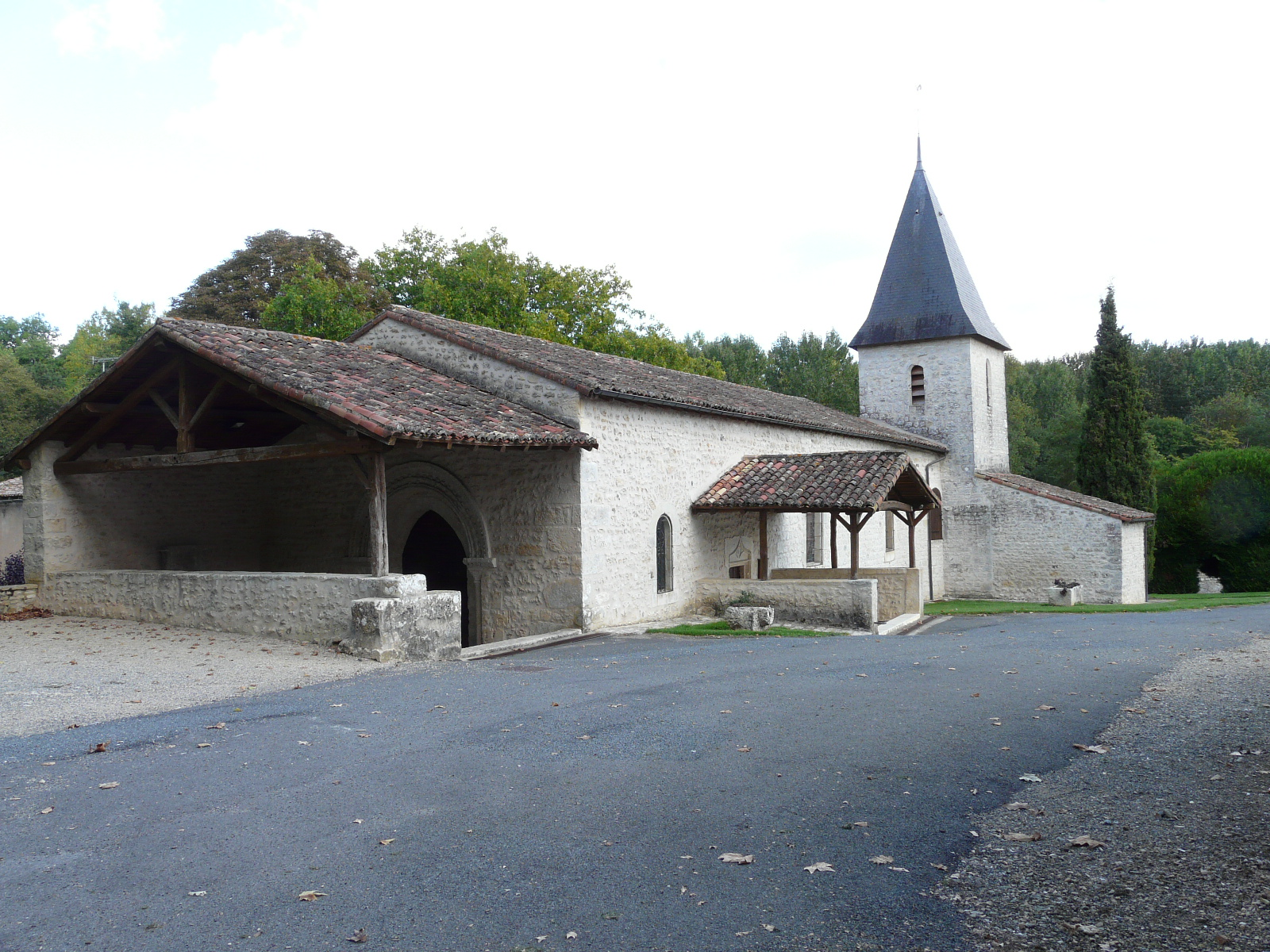
- The church in Quincay
- Location of Quinçay
- Location within France Location within Nouvelle-Aquitaine
- Coordinates: 46°36′26″N 0°14′14″E
- Country: France
- Region: Nouvelle-Aquitaine
- Department: Vienne
- Arrondissement: Poitiers
- Canton: Vouneuil-sous-Biard
- Intercommunality: Haut-Poitou

Government
  - Mayor (2020–2026): Philippe Brault
- Area^{1}: 29.66 km^{2} (11.45 sq mi)
- Elevation: 105 m (344 ft)
- Highest elevation: 146 m (479 ft)
- Lowest elevation: 82 m (269 ft)
- Population (2023): 2,139
  - Density: 72.12/km^{2} (186.8/sq mi)
- Time zone: UTC+01:00 (CET)
  - Summer (DST): UTC+02:00 (CEST)
- INSEE/Postal code: 86204 /86190
- ^{1} French Land Register data, which excludes lakes, ponds, glaciers > 1 km^{2} (0.386 sq mi or 247 acres) and river estuaries.

Quinçay (French pronunciation: [kɛ̃sɛ]) is a commune in the Vienne department in the Nouvelle-Aquitaine region in western France.

== Population ==
Historical population
Year	Pop.	±% p.a.
1968	709	—
1975	862	+2.83%
1982	1,216	+5.04%
1990	1,564	+3.20%
1999	1,663	+0.68%
2007	2,101	+2.97%
2012	2,219	+1.10%
2017	2,215	−0.04%
2023	2,139	−0.58%
Source: INSEE

== Places of interest ==
- The castle of Masseuil (Château de Masseuil) is listed.
- The door of the Quinçay church has been listed in 1926.
- The wash-house on Auxance river
- The logis of Pré-Bernard.
- The fountain of Ringère

== See also ==
- Communes of the Vienne department
