= Adelelmus of Flanders =

Saint Adelelmus
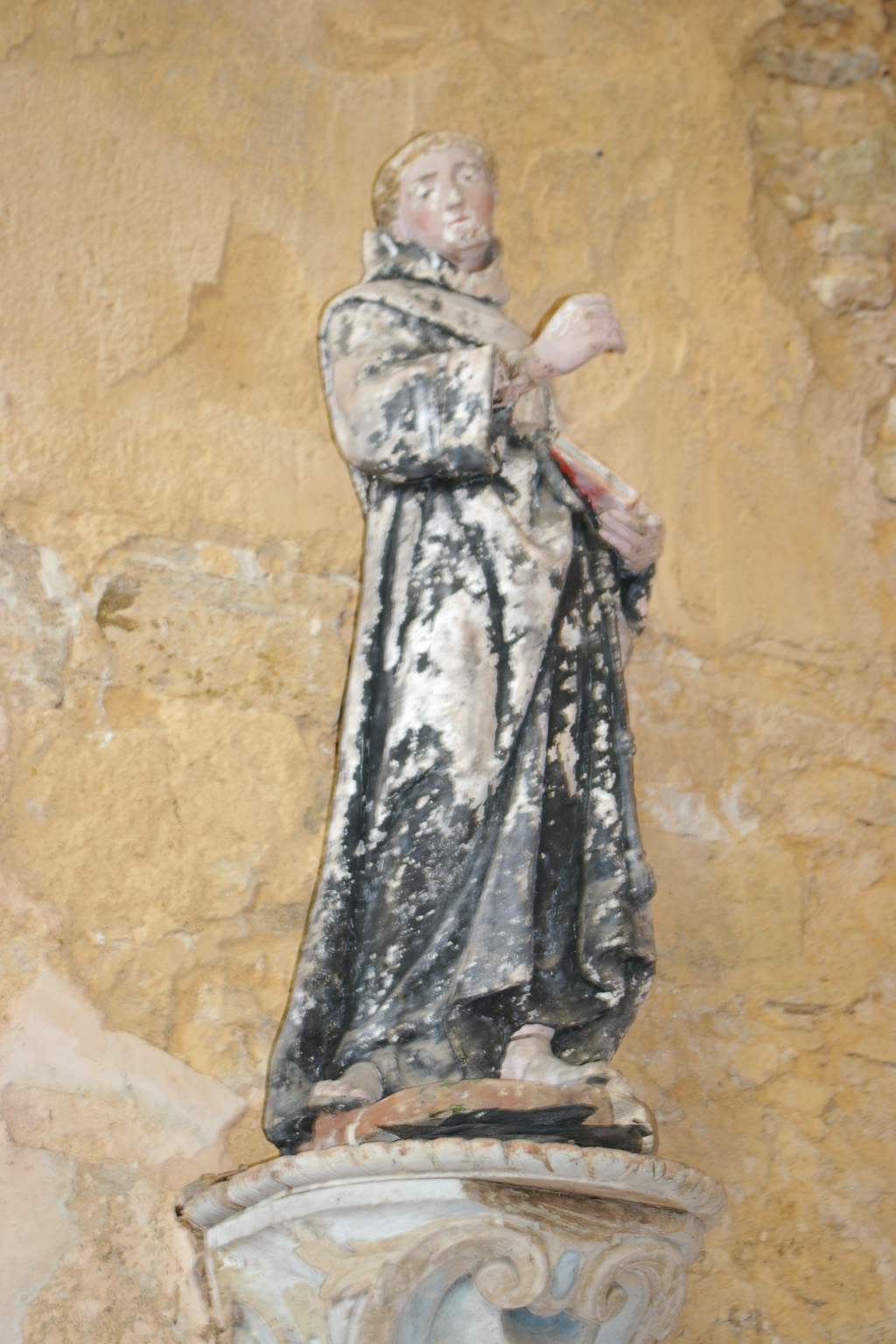
- Statue of Adelelmus in the monastery of Etival-en-Charnie
- Born: Flanders, Belgium
- Died: 1152
- Venerated in: Roman Catholic Church
- Feast: 27 April

Adelelmus (French: Alleaume or Adelin; died 27 April 1152) was a hermit and disciple of Bernard of Thiron. He founded the monastery of Étival-en-Charnie. He is regarded as a saint in the Catholic Church.

Adelelmus' life is known from the biographies of Bernard of Thiron and Robert of Arbrissel, and from the foundation charter of Étival. He was a native of Flanders. He joined an old hermit named Aubert near Saint-Ellier-du-Maine in a life of fasting and prayer. He attempted to join Bernard at Chausey, but found the climate on the island intolerable and returned to Aubert. When Aubert decided to end his days in the community of Raoul de La Futaie, Adelelmus decided to form a monastic community for men and women. He received a gift of land in the diocese of Le Mans from Viscount Raoul VII de Beaumont-au-Maine in 1109. The male monastery was dedicated to Saint Nicholas. It did not long survive Adelelmus, but the nunnery at Étival, originally led by Raoul's daughter Godealdis, was more successful. Adelelmus acquired the parish of Livet for the nunnery. He earned a reputation as a great preacher. He died on 27 April 1152 and was buried in Étival.

A statue of Adelelmus stands in the chapel of Saint Nicholas at Étival. The diocese of Le Mans had a special liturgical office for his memory, but it was suppressed in 1835.
