= La Cerlangue =

- Commune
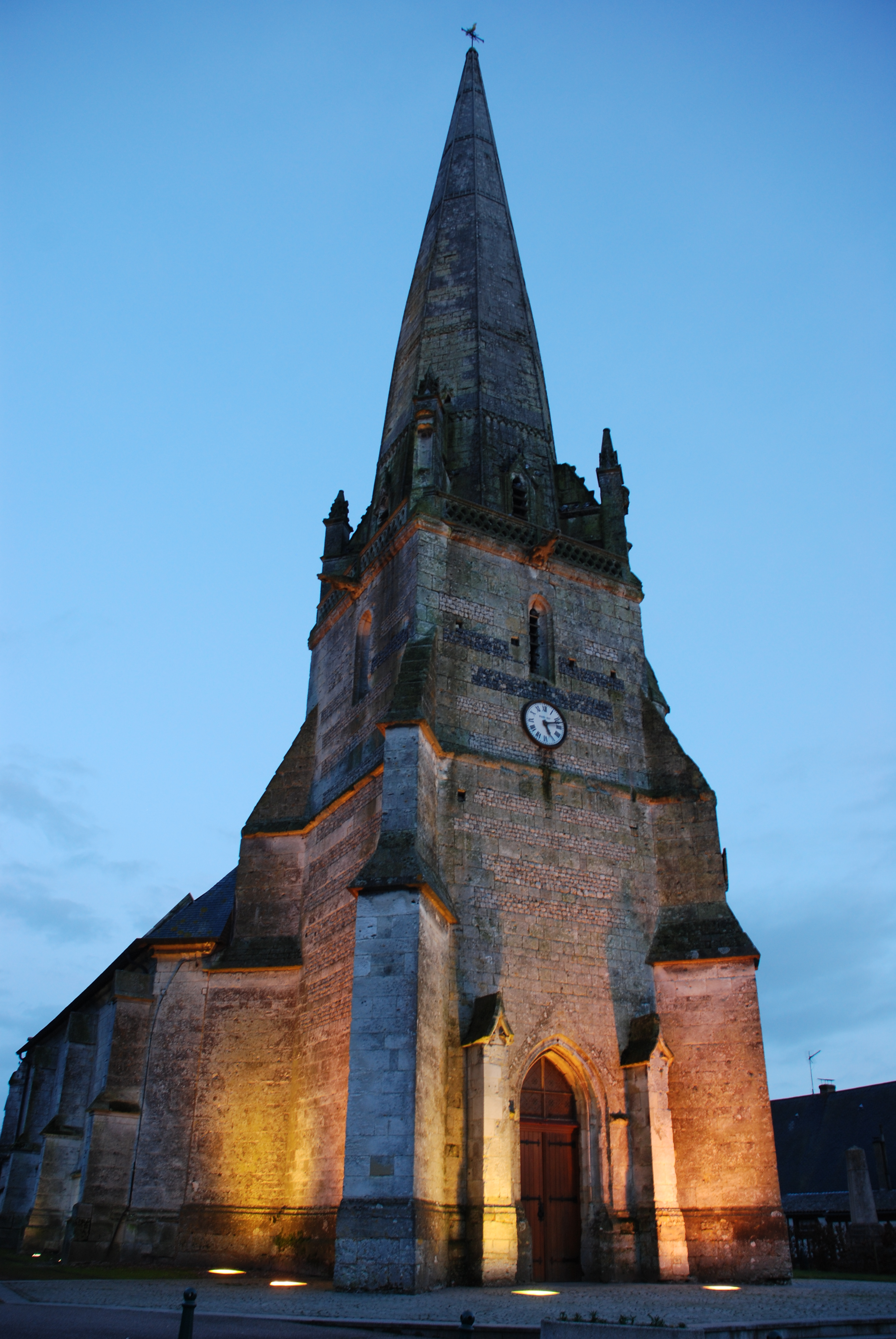
- The church in La Cerlangue
- Location of La Cerlangue
- Location within France Location within Normandy
- Coordinates: 49°30′27″N 0°24′53″E
- Country: France
- Region: Normandy
- Department: Seine-Maritime
- Arrondissement: Le Havre
- Canton: Saint-Romain-de-Colbosc
- Intercommunality: Le Havre Seine Métropole

Government
  - Mayor (2026–32): Lionel Dehon
- Area^{1}: 27.93 km^{2} (10.78 sq mi)
- Elevation: 120 m (390 ft)
- Highest elevation: 127 m (417 ft)
- Lowest elevation: 0 m (0 ft)
- Population (2023): 1,300
  - Density: 47/km^{2} (120/sq mi)
- Time zone: UTC+01:00 (CET)
  - Summer (DST): UTC+02:00 (CEST)
- INSEE/Postal code: 76169 /76430
- ^{1} French Land Register data, which excludes lakes, ponds, glaciers > 1 km^{2} (0.386 sq mi or 247 acres) and river estuaries.

La Cerlangue (French pronunciation: [la sɛʁlɑ̃ɡ]) is a commune in the Seine-Maritime department in the Normandy region in northern France.

== Geography ==
A farming village in the Pays de Caux, some 10 miles (16 km) east of Le Havre, at the junction of the D112 and D910 roads. The canal de Tancarville and the A131 autoroute cut through the middle of the commune. The river Seine forms the commune's southern border.

== Population ==
Historical population
Year	Pop.	±% p.a.
1968	754	—
1975	890	+2.40%
1982	895	+0.08%
1990	983	+1.18%
1999	1,106	+1.32%
2007	1,206	+1.09%
2012	1,308	+1.64%
2017	1,289	−0.29%
2023	1,300	+0.14%
Source: INSEE

== Toponymy ==
The name of the locality appears as Cellengue around 1240, Latinized as Cervi lingua ("deer tongue") in 1248 and in the Norman dialectal forms Cherlengue or Chellengue (with assimilation of /r/) from the 13th century to the 15th century. The name may be related to the presence, in the nearby wood, of the hart's-tongue fern (asplenium scolopendrium) called in Modern French langue-de-cerf, but Old North French *cer(f)langue "deer's tongue", compare dent-de-lion "dandelion", called liondent as well.

The parish of Saint-Jean-d'Abbetot was annexed to La Cerlangue in 1824. Abbetot was written as Abetot around 1060. It is a medieval toponymic formation using the -tot suffix (old Scandinavian topt, toft "rural establishment, farm"), preceded by a man's name, either Abbo from Western Germanic (with Abon, Abbon used in old texts), or Abbi from northern Germanic, old Norse or old Danish, a nickname of Ábiǫrn, whose second element -biǫrn is from old Norse biǫrn "bear" (Swedish björn, Danish / Norwegian bjørn). The Norman Baron Urse d'Abetot (Latin: Ursus de Abbetot or Urso de Abbetot, French: Ours d'Abbetot), was probably from this hamlet. Latin ursus means "bear" in English.

== History ==
The village of Saint-Jean-d'Abbetot was merged into La Cerlangue in 1824, which is why there are two ancient churches in La Cerlangue.

== Places of interest ==
- Church of Saint-Léonard de La Cerlangue (fr), dating from the thirteenth century.
- The eleventh century church of St.Jean-d'Abbetot (fr).

== See also ==
- Communes of the Seine-Maritime department
